= National Register of Historic Places listings in downtown Denver =

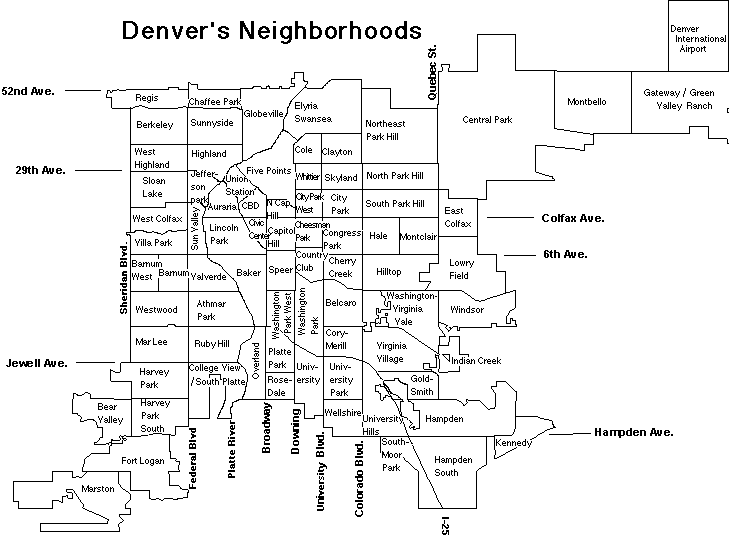
The 78 official neighborhoods of the City and County of Denver.

This is a list of the National Register of Historic Places listings in Downtown Denver, Colorado.

This is intended to be a complete list of the properties and districts on the National Register of Historic Places in downtown Denver, Colorado, United States. Downtown Denver is defined as being the neighborhoods of Capitol Hill, Central Business District, Civic Center, Five Points, North Capitol Hill, and Union Station. The locations of National Register properties and districts may be seen in an online map.

There are 328 properties and districts listed on the National Register in Denver, including 1 National Historic Landmark. Downtown Denver includes 159 of these properties and districts, including the National Historic Landmark and 2 that extend into other regions; the city's remaining properties and districts are listed elsewhere. Another 7 properties in downtown Denver were once listed but have been removed.

This National Park Service list is complete through NPS recent listings posted October 30, 2026.

== Current listings ==
	Name on the Register	Image	Date listed	Location	Neighborhood	Description
1	19th Street Bridge	19th Street Bridge	February 4, 1985 (#85000201)	19th St. 39°45′36″N 105°00′12″W	Union Station	Extends into Highland in West Denver
2	Arcanum Apartments	Arcanum Apartments	January 21, 1999 (#98001629)	1904 Logan St. 39°44′47″N 104°58′54″W	North Capitol Hill	
3	Arno Apartments	Arno Apartments	February 5, 1987 (#87000009)	325 E. 18th Ave. 39°44′42″N 104°58′55″W	North Capitol Hill	
4	Bailey House	Bailey House	September 18, 1978 (#78000840)	1600 Ogden St. 39°44′31″N 104°58′26″W	North Capitol Hill	
5	Caroline Bancroft House	Caroline Bancroft House	August 29, 1990 (#90001086)	1079-81 Downing St. and 1180 E. 11th 39°44′33″N 104°58′22″W	Capitol Hill	
6	Baur Confectionery Company	Baur Confectionery Company	July 6, 2006 (#06000590)	1512-14 Curtis St. 39°44′46″N 104°59′42″W	Central Business District	
7	Bennett-Field House	Bennett-Field House	July 8, 2010 (#10000435)	740 Clarkson St. 39°44′49″N 104°59′30″W	Capitol Hill	
8	Boston Building	Boston Building	September 18, 1978 (#78000841)	828 17th St. 39°44′49″N 104°59′30″W	Central Business District	
9	Bouvier-Lothrop House	Bouvier-Lothrop House	September 4, 1980 (#80000886)	1600 Emerson St. 39°44′31″N 104°58′31″W	North Capitol Hill	
10	Brinker Collegiate Institute	Brinker Collegiate Institute	October 28, 1977 (#77000365)	1725–1727 Tremont Pl. 39°44′41″N 104°59′17″W	Central Business District	1880-built private school building
11	655 Broadway Building	655 Broadway Building	April 24, 2023 (#100008903)	655 Broadway; 39°43′35″N 104°59′15″W	Lincoln Park	
12	Brown Palace Hotel	Brown Palace Hotel	April 28, 1970 (#70000157)	17th St. and Tremont Pl. 39°44′39″N 104°59′14″W	Central Business District	
13	J.S. Brown Mercantile Building	J.S. Brown Mercantile Building	November 3, 1988 (#88002375)	1634 18th St. 39°45′12″N 104°59′52″W	Union Station	
14	Molly Brown House	Molly Brown House	February 1, 1972 (#72000269)	1340 Pennsylvania St. 39°44′14″N 104°58′49″W	Capitol Hill	
15	Buerger Brothers Building and Annex	Buerger Brothers Building and Annex	September 25, 1998 (#98001198)	1732–1740 Champa St. 39°44′53″N 104°59′28″W	Central Business District	
16	Burlington Hotel	Burlington Hotel	April 23, 1998 (#98000373)	2205 Larimer St. 39°45′19″N 104°59′23″W	Five Points	
17	Burte Hotel	Burte Hotel	September 24, 2026 (#100012697)	1025 Broadway; 39°43′57″N 104°59′15″W	Civic Center	
18	Alfred Butters House	Alfred Butters House	October 29, 1982 (#82004913)	1129 Pennsylvania; 39°44′04″N 104°58′47″W	Capitol Hill	
19	Byers-Evans House	Byers-Evans House	August 25, 1970 (#70000158)	1310 Bannock St. 39°44′14″N 104°59′22″W	Civic Center	
20	Capitol Life Insurance Building	Capitol Life Insurance Building	December 1, 1997 (#97000556)	1600 Sherman St. and 225 E. 16th St. 39°44′31″N 104°59′02″W	North Capitol Hill	
21	Carter-Rice Building	Carter-Rice Building	September 20, 1984 (#84000805)	1623–1631 Blake St. 39°45′04″N 104°59′55″W	Union Station	
22	Cathedral of the Immaculate Conception	Cathedral of the Immaculate Conception	March 3, 1975 (#75000506)	Northeastern corner of Colfax Ave. and Logan St. 39°44′26″N 104°58′53″W	North Capitol Hill	
23	Cathedral High School and Convent		November 5, 2026 (#100013407)	1840 Grant Street - 330 E. 19th Avenue; 39°44′46″N 104°59′00″W	North Capitol Hill	
24	Central Presbyterian Church	Central Presbyterian Church	November 21, 1974 (#74000565)	1660 Sherman St. 39°44′35″N 104°59′02″W	North Capitol Hill	
25	Chamber of Commerce Building	Chamber of Commerce Building	January 16, 2001 (#00001647)	1726 Champa St. 39°44′53″N 104°59′29″W	Central Business District	
26	The Chateau	The Chateau	January 25, 2007 (#06001288)	900 Sherman St. 39°43′50″N 104°59′02″W	Capitol Hill	
27	Christ Methodist Episcopal Church	Christ Methodist Episcopal Church	November 7, 1976 (#76000549)	2201 Ogden St. 39°44′59″N 104°58′28″W	Five Points	
28	Civic Center Historic District	Civic Center Historic District	February 27, 1974 (#74002348)	Roughly bounded by W. Colfax, E. Colfax, Grant, E. 14th, Broadway, E. 13th, W. 13th, Bannock, W. 14th, and Delaware; 39°44′22″N 104°59′16″W	Civic Center	Part of the district, the buildings associated with the City Beautiful period, was designated a National Historic Landmark on October 16, 2012; documentation
29	Clements Rowhouse	Clements Rowhouse	September 12, 1980 (#80000888)	2201–2217 Glenarm Pl. 39°44′59″N 104°58′57″W	Five Points	
30	Colburn Hotel	Colburn Hotel	July 31, 2020 (#100005391)	980 Grant St. 39°43′54″N 104°59′01″W	Capitol Hill	
31	Colorado Governor's Mansion	Colorado Governor's Mansion	December 3, 1969 (#69000039)	400 E. 8th Ave. 39°43′43″N 104°58′53″W	Capitol Hill	
32	Colorado National Bank Building	Colorado National Bank Building	April 27, 2010 (#10000215)	918 17th St. 39°44′51″N 104°59′36″W	Central Business District	
33	Colorado State Capitol Annex Building and Boiler Plant	Colorado State Capitol Annex Building and Boiler Plant	June 24, 1991 (#91000824)	1341 Sherman St. 39°44′17″N 104°59′05″W	Capitol Hill	
34	Cornwall Apartments	Cornwall Apartments	October 8, 1976 (#76000550)	1317 Ogden St., 912 E. 13th Ave. 39°44′13″N 104°57′49″W	Capitol Hill	
35	Crawford Hill Mansion	Crawford Hill Mansion	September 13, 1990 (#90001417)	969 Sherman St. 39°43′54″N 104°59′05″W	Capitol Hill	
36	Creswell Mansion	Creswell Mansion	November 25, 1977 (#77000366)	1244 Grant St. 39°44′11″N 104°58′58″W	Capitol Hill	
37	F.W. Crocker and Company Steam Cracker Factory	F.W. Crocker and Company Steam Cracker Factory	June 21, 1984 (#84000808)	1862 Blake St. 39°45′11″N 104°59′42″W	Union Station	
38	Croke-Patterson-Campbell Mansion	Croke-Patterson-Campbell Mansion	September 19, 1973 (#73000467)	428-430 E. 11th Ave. 39°44′00″N 104°58′52″W	Capitol Hill	
39	Cullen-Thompson Motor Company	Cullen-Thompson Motor Company	August 3, 2026 (#100013295)	1000 Broadway; 39°43′56″N 104°59′14″W	Capitol Hill	
40	Curry-Chucovich House	Curry-Chucovich House	June 9, 1978 (#78000842)	1439 Court Pl. 39°44′29″N 104°59′24″W	Central Business District	
41	Curtis-Champa Streets District	Curtis-Champa Streets District	April 1, 1975 (#75000507)	Roughly bounded by Arapahoe, 30th, California, and 24th Sts.; also roughly 30th, Stout, Downing and Arapahoe Sts. 39°45′29″N 104°58′43″W	Five Points	Second set of addresses represents a boundary increase
42	Daniels and Fisher Tower	Daniels and Fisher Tower	December 3, 1969 (#69000040)	1101 16th St. 39°44′54″N 104°59′43″W	Central Business District	
43	Denver Athletic Club	Denver Athletic Club	November 14, 1979 (#79000580)	1325 Glenarm Pl. 39°44′30″N 104°59′35″W	Central Business District	
44	Denver City Cable Railway Building	Denver City Cable Railway Building	July 2, 1979 (#79000581)	1801 Lawrence St. 39°45′02″N 104°59′38″W	Union Station	
45	Denver City Railway Company Building	Denver City Railway Company Building	June 4, 1984 (#84000810)	1635 17th St., 1734–1736 Wynkoop St. 39°45′10″N 104°59′56″W	Union Station	designed by Viggo Baerresen and Harold Baerressen, architects
46	Denver Civic Center Classroom Building	Denver Civic Center Classroom Building	December 6, 1990 (#90001346)	1445 Cleveland Pl. 39°44′26″N 104°59′21″W	Civic Center	
47	Denver-Colorado Springs-Pueblo Motor Way Company Inc. Garages	Denver-Colorado Springs-Pueblo Motor Way Company Inc. Garages	October 4, 2017 (#100001696)	2106 California & 2101 Welton Sts. 39°44′58″N 104°59′08″W	Five Points	
48	Denver Dry Goods Company Building	Denver Dry Goods Company Building	January 9, 1978 (#78000843)	16th and California Sts. 39°44′42″N 104°59′33″W	Central Business District	
49	Denver Mint	Denver Mint	February 1, 1972 (#72000270)	W. Colfax Ave. and Delaware St. 39°44′23″N 104°59′30″W	Civic Center	
50	Denver Municipal Auditorium	Denver Municipal Auditorium	October 16, 1991 (#91001531)	1323 Champa St. 39°44′41″N 104°59′47″W	Central Business District	
51	Denver Press Club	Denver Press Club	January 17, 2017 (#100000473)	1330 Glenarm Pl. 39°44′29″N 104°59′36″W	Central Business District	
52	Denver Public Library	Denver Public Library	December 6, 1990 (#90001345)	1357 Broadway; 39°44′15″N 104°59′17″W	Civic Center	
53	Downtown Denver Central YMCA and Annex	Downtown Denver Central YMCA and Annex	July 30, 2004 (#04000736)	25 E. 16th Ave. 39°44′31″N 104°59′11″W	North Capitol Hill	
54	Dunning-Benedict House	Dunning-Benedict House	September 20, 1984 (#84000811)	1200 Pennsylvania St. 39°44′08″N 104°58′49″W	Capitol Hill	
55	John Elsner House	John Elsner House	December 17, 1979 (#79000583)	2810 Arapahoe St. 39°45′33″N 104°58′49″W	Five Points	
56	Emerson School	Emerson School	September 26, 1997 (#97001169)	1420 Ogden St. 39°44′20″N 104°58′28″W	Capitol Hill	
57	Enterprise Hill Historic District	Enterprise Hill Historic District	August 9, 1979 (#79000584)	Bounded by 21st and 22nd Sts. and Tremont and Glenarm Pls. 39°44′55″N 104°58′58″W	Five Points	
58	Eppich Apartments	Eppich Apartments	January 5, 1984 (#84000813)	1266 Emerson St. 39°44′11″N 104°58′32″W	Capitol Hill	
59	Equitable Building	Equitable Building	January 9, 1978 (#78000845)	730 17th St. 39°44′47″N 104°59′28″W	Central Business District	
60	Equity Savings and Loan Company	Equity Savings and Loan Company	July 28, 2025 (#100011570)	2559-63 Welton Street/608 26th Street; 39°45′14″N 104°58′46″W	Five Points	
61	Evans School	Evans School	October 3, 1980 (#80000889)	1115 Acoma St. 39°44′04″N 104°59′20″W	Civic Center	
62	Fire Station No. 1	Fire Station No. 1	November 14, 1979 (#79000586)	1326 Tremont Pl. 39°44′26″N 104°59′33″W	Central Business District	Fire station built in 1909, now the Denver Firefighters Museum.
63	Fire Station No. 3	Fire Station No. 3	July 29, 2024 (#100010578)	2500 Washington Street; 39°45′12″N 104°58′41″W	Five Points	
64	First Baptist Church of Denver	First Baptist Church of Denver	September 28, 2005 (#05001088)	230 E. 14th Ave.-1373 Grant St. 39°44′18″N 104°59′01″W	Capitol Hill	
65	First Congregational Church	First Congregational Church	November 16, 1987 (#87002011)	980 Clarkson St. 39°43′54″N 104°58′36″W	Capitol Hill	
66	First National Bank Building	First National Bank Building	February 23, 1996 (#96000165)	818 17th St. 39°44′49″N 104°59′31″W	Central Business District	
67	William G. Fisher House	William G. Fisher House	November 20, 1974 (#74000569)	1600 Logan St. 39°44′31″N 104°58′55″W	North Capitol Hill	
68	Fleming-Hanington House	Fleming-Hanington House	October 29, 1982 (#82001009)	1133 Pennsylvania; 39°44′03″N 104°58′47″W	Capitol Hill	
69	John S. Flower House	John S. Flower House	September 4, 1980 (#80000890)	1618 Ogden St. 39°44′32″N 104°58′26″W	North Capitol Hill	
70	Flower-Vaile House	Flower-Vaile House	October 21, 1982 (#82001010)	1610 Emerson St. 39°44′31″N 104°58′33″W	North Capitol Hill	
71	Barney L. Ford Building	Barney L. Ford Building	June 24, 1976 (#76000551)	1514 Blake St. 39°45′00″N 105°00′04″W	Union Station	
72	Justina Ford House	Justina Ford House	November 23, 1984 (#84000244)	3091 California St. 39°45′33″N 104°58′26″W	Five Points	
73	A.C. Foster Building	A.C. Foster Building	January 9, 1978 (#78000846)	912 16th St. 39°44′47″N 104°59′37″W	Central Business District	
74	Gebhard Mansion	Gebhard Mansion	October 1, 1992 (#92001254)	2253 Downing St. 39°45′02″N 104°58′23″W	Five Points	
75	General Electric Building	General Electric Building	August 25, 1983 (#83001308)	1441 18th St. 39°45′10″N 104°59′46″W	Union Station	
76	Glenarm Place Historic Residential District	Glenarm Place Historic Residential District	August 25, 1983 (#83001309)	2417–2462 Glenarm Pl. 39°45′07″N 104°58′46″W	Five Points	
77	The Grafton	The Grafton	October 21, 1982 (#82001011)	1001–1020 E. 17th Ave. 39°44′37″N 104°58′25″W	North Capitol Hill	
78	Grant-Humphreys Mansion	Grant-Humphreys Mansion	September 30, 1970 (#70000160)	770 Pennsylvania St. 39°43′42″N 104°58′49″W	Capitol Hill	Neo-classical style mansion
79	Emily Griffith Opportunity School	Emily Griffith Opportunity School	November 25, 2022 (#100008396)	1250 Welton St. 39°44′28″N 104°59′44″W		
80	Grimm Block	Grimm Block	June 25, 1992 (#92000807)	2031–2033 Curtis St. 39°45′01″N 104°59′21″W	Five Points	
81	Guerrieri-Decunto House	Guerrieri-Decunto House	September 10, 1979 (#79000587)	1650 Pennsylvania St. 39°44′34″N 104°58′49″W	North Capitol Hill	
82	George Hamburger Block	George Hamburger Block	January 25, 1990 (#89002382)	2199 Arapahoe St. 39°45′13″N 104°59′18″W	Five Points	
83	Haskell House	Haskell House	September 15, 1983 (#83001310)	1651 Emerson St. 39°44′40″N 104°58′31″W	North Capitol Hill	
84	Helene Apartment Building	Helene Apartment Building	March 12, 1998 (#98000226)	1062 Pearl St. 39°43′59″N 104°58′45″W	Capitol Hill	
85	Hendrie and Bolthoff Warehouse Building	Hendrie and Bolthoff Warehouse Building	February 9, 1988 (#87002544)	1743 Wazee; 39°45′10″N 104°59′52″W	Union Station	
86	W.A. Hover and Company Building	W.A. Hover and Company Building	July 8, 1999 (#99000794)	1390 Lawrence St. 39°44′47″N 104°59′54″W	Central Business District	
87	Ideal Building	Ideal Building	June 9, 1977 (#77000367)	821 17th St. 39°44′51″N 104°59′31″W	Central Business District	The first tall building constructed of reinforced concrete west of the Mississippi
88	Harry C. James House	Harry C. James House	December 7, 2020 (#100005854)	685 North Emerson St. 39°43′38″N 104°58′35″W		
89	Joslin Dry Goods Company Building	Joslin Dry Goods Company Building	August 14, 1997 (#97000893)	934 16th St. 39°44′49″N 104°59′40″W	Central Business District	
90	Jeffery and Mary Keating House	Jeffery and Mary Keating House	October 22, 1980 (#80000892)	1207 Pennsylvania St. 39°44′08″N 104°58′51″W	Capitol Hill	
91	Kistler Stationery Company Building	Kistler Stationery Company Building	April 14, 1997 (#97000298)	1636 Champa St. 39°44′49″N 104°59′33″W	Central Business District	
92	Kistler-Rodriguez House	Kistler-Rodriguez House	May 27, 1983 (#83001311)	700 E. 9th Ave. 39°43′48″N 104°58′40″W	Capitol Hill	
93	Kittredge Building	Kittredge Building	December 2, 1977 (#77000368)	511 16th St. 39°44′39″N 104°59′24″W	Central Business District	
94	Kopper's Hotel and Saloon	Kopper's Hotel and Saloon	June 4, 1999 (#98001378)	1215–1219 20th St. 39°45′10″N 104°59′29″W	Five Points	
95	William Lang Townhouse	William Lang Townhouse	August 18, 1983 (#83001312)	1626 Washington St. 39°44′32″N 104°58′41″W	North Capitol Hill	
96	Larimer Square	Larimer Square	May 7, 1973 (#73000468)	1400 block of Larimer St.; also 1404 Larimer St. 39°44′56″N 104°59′55″W	Union Station	1404 Larimer represents a boundary increase. Includes Granite Building
97	A.T. Lewis and Son Department Store	A.T. Lewis and Son Department Store	December 23, 1994 (#94001470)	800-816 16th St. 39°44′45″N 104°59′35″W	Central Business District	
98	A.T. Lewis New Building	A.T. Lewis New Building	August 19, 1994 (#94001006)	1531 Stout St. 39°44′44″N 104°59′36″W	Central Business District	
99	Littleton Creamery-Beatrice Foods Cold Storage Warehouse	Littleton Creamery-Beatrice Foods Cold Storage Warehouse	September 5, 1985 (#85001952)	1801 Wynkoop St. 39°45′16″N 104°59′52″W	Union Station	
100	Masonic Temple Building	Masonic Temple Building	November 22, 1977 (#77000369)	1614 Welton St. 39°44′40″N 104°59′25″W	Central Business District	
101	McClintock Building	McClintock Building	January 26, 2005 (#04001554)	1550-58 California St./622-40 16th St. 39°44′41″N 104°59′29″W	Central Business District	
102	McPhee and McGinnity Building	McPhee and McGinnity Building	September 20, 1984 (#84000816)	2301 Blake St. 39°45′27″N 104°59′25″W	Five Points	
103	McPhee and McGinnity Paint Factory	McPhee and McGinnity Paint Factory	August 21, 2003 (#03000776)	2519 Walnut St. 39°45′31″N 104°59′12″W	Five Points	
104	Midland Savings Building	Midland Savings Building	February 2, 2001 (#01000030)	444 17th St. 39°44′40″N 104°59′19″W	Central Business District	
105	Moffat Station	Moffat Station	October 22, 1976 (#76000553)	2105 15th St. 39°45′16″N 105°00′19″W	Union Station	
106	Montgomery Court	Montgomery Court	October 2, 1986 (#86002810)	215 E. 11th Ave. 39°44′03″N 104°59′04″W	Capitol Hill	
107	Dora Moore Elementary School	Dora Moore Elementary School	June 9, 1978 (#78000849)	846 Corona St. 39°43′47″N 104°58′22″W	Capitol Hill	
108	Mosque of the El Jebel Shrine	Mosque of the El Jebel Shrine	October 24, 1997 (#97001235)	1770 Sherman St. 39°44′41″N 104°59′02″W	North Capitol Hill	
109	Neusteter Building	Neusteter Building	November 30, 1987 (#87002070)	720 16th St. 39°44′44″N 104°59′33″W	Central Business District	
110	New Terrace	New Terrace	February 5, 1987 (#87000008)	900-914 E. 20th Ave. 39°44′50″N 104°58′30″W	Five Points	
111	Ogden Theatre	Ogden Theatre	August 31, 1995 (#95001055)	935 E. Colfax Ave. 39°44′25″N 104°58′29″W	North Capitol Hill	
112	Orlando Flats	Orlando Flats	February 16, 1984 (#84000818)	2330 Washington St. 39°45′05″N 104°58′38″W	Five Points	
113	Oxford Hotel	Oxford Hotel	April 17, 1979 (#79000590)	1612 17th St. 39°45′07″N 104°59′55″W	Union Station	
114	Pacific Express Stable	Pacific Express Stable	September 20, 1984 (#84000821)	2363 Blake St. 39°45′29″N 104°59′22″W	Five Points	
115	Judge Peter L. Palmer House	Judge Peter L. Palmer House	October 21, 1982 (#82001012)	1250 Ogden St. 39°44′09″N 104°58′28″W	Capitol Hill	
116	Palmer-Ferril House	Palmer-Ferril House	November 3, 1992 (#92001408)	2123 Downing St. 39°45′02″N 104°58′31″W	Five Points	
117	Paramount Theater	Paramount Theater	November 21, 1980 (#80000893)	519 16th St. 39°44′38″N 104°59′26″W	Central Business District	
118	Peters Paper Company Warehouse	Peters Paper Company Warehouse	June 16, 1988 (#88000757)	1625–1631 Wazee St. 39°45′06″N 104°59′56″W	Union Station	
119	The Petroleum Club Building	The Petroleum Club Building	March 10, 2025 (#100011506)	110 16th Street; 39°44′30″N 104°59′16″W	Central Business District	
120	Pierce-Haley House	Pierce-Haley House	October 3, 1984 (#84000583)	857 Grant St. 39°43′49″N 104°59′00″W	Capitol Hill	
121	Pride of the Rockies Flour Mill	Pride of the Rockies Flour Mill	December 7, 1995 (#95001420)	2100 20th St. 39°45′36″N 104°59′58″W	Union Station	
122	Public Service Building	Public Service Building	July 20, 1978 (#78000851)	910 15th St. 39°44′44″N 104°59′42″W	Central Business District	former Gas & Electric Building, 1910
123	Railway Exchange Addition and Railway Exchange New Building	Railway Exchange Addition and Railway Exchange New Building	October 17, 1997 (#97001213)	1715 Champa St. and 909 17th St. 39°44′53″N 104°59′31″W	Central Business District	Designed by Fisher and Fisher, architects
124	Ray Apartments Buildings	Ray Apartments Buildings	February 2, 2001 (#01000029)	1550 and 1560 Ogden St. 39°44′29″N 104°58′26″W	North Capitol Hill	
125	Rocky Mountain Bank Note Company Building	Rocky Mountain Bank Note Company Building	July 1, 1999 (#99000766)	1080 Delaware St. 39°44′02″N 104°59′32″W	Civic Center	
126	Rossonian Hotel	Rossonian Hotel	August 15, 1995 (#95001009)	2650 Welton St. 39°45′15″N 104°58′40″W	Five Points	
127	St. Andrew's Episcopal Church	St. Andrew's Episcopal Church	March 18, 1975 (#75000512)	2015 Glenarm Pl. 39°44′53″N 104°59′05″W	Five Points	
128	St. John's Cathedral	St. John's Cathedral	August 1, 1975 (#75000513)	14th and Washington Sts. 39°44′16″N 104°58′39″W	Capitol Hill	
129	St. Mark's Parish Church	St. Mark's Parish Church	September 18, 1975 (#75000514)	1160 Lincoln St. 39°44′06″N 104°59′05″W	Capitol Hill	
130	St. Paul's English Evangelical Lutheran Church	St. Paul's English Evangelical Lutheran Church	September 30, 1997 (#97001191)	1600 Grant St. 39°44′31″N 104°58′58″W	North Capitol Hill	
131	San Rafael Historic District	San Rafael Historic District	June 20, 1986 (#86001353)	Roughly bounded by E. 26th Ave., Downing St., E. 20th Ave., and Washington St. 39°45′03″N 104°58′30″W	Five Points	
132	George Schleier Mansion	George Schleier Mansion	November 17, 1977 (#77000370)	1665 Grant St. 39°44′35″N 104°58′59″W	North Capitol Hill	
133	Sheedy Mansion	Sheedy Mansion	August 4, 2004 (#04000780)	1115–1121 Grant St. 39°44′03″N 104°59′02″W	Capitol Hill	
134	Sherman Street Historic District	Sherman Street Historic District	October 27, 2004 (#04001178)	Approximately 1000 to 1099 Sherman St. 39°43′58″N 104°59′04″W	Capitol Hill	
135	Shorter Community AME Church	Shorter Community AME Church	June 23, 2025 (#100011590)	119 Park Ave West; 39°44′52″N 104°58′43″W	Five Points	
136	Soldiers and Sailors Club-Colored	Soldiers and Sailors Club-Colored	July 28, 2025 (#100011569)	2404 Clarkson Street; 39°45′08″N 104°58′37″W	Five Points	
137	Speer Boulevard	Speer Boulevard	September 17, 1986 (#86002240)	Speer Boulevard from W. Colfax Ave. to Downing St. 39°43′42″N 104°59′09″W	Civic Center	Extends into Lincoln Park in Northeast Denver and Speer in Southeast Denver
138	Spratlen-Anderson Wholesale Grocery Company-Davis Brothers Warehouse	Spratlen-Anderson Wholesale Grocery Company-Davis Brothers Warehouse	December 3, 1985 (#85003061)	1450 Wynkoop St. 39°45′02″N 105°00′06″W	Union Station	
139	Stearns House	Stearns House	June 3, 1982 (#82002296)	1030 Logan St. 39°43′58″N 104°58′54″W	Capitol Hill	
140	Sugar Building	Sugar Building	February 17, 1978 (#78000852)	1530 16th St. 39°45′03″N 104°59′58″W	Union Station	
141	Swallow Hill Historic District	Swallow Hill Historic District	January 7, 1988 (#87002295)	Roughly bounded by Clarkson St., E. 17th Ave., Downing St., and E. Colfax Ave. 39°44′33″N 104°58′28″W	North Capitol Hill	
142	Tammen Hall	Tammen Hall	November 14, 2019 (#100004612)	1010 E. 19th Ave. 39°44′46″N 104°58′27″W	Five Points	
143	Telephone Building	Telephone Building	January 26, 2005 (#04001555)	931 14th St. 39°44′43″N 104°59′49″W	Central Business District	
144	Temple Emanuel	Temple Emanuel	October 10, 1978 (#78000853)	2400 Curtis St. 39°45′16″N 104°59′03″W	Five Points	
145	Temple Emanuel	Temple Emanuel	November 25, 1987 (#87001554)	1595 Pearl St. 39°44′29″N 104°58′47″W	North Capitol Hill	
146	H.H. Thomas House	H.H. Thomas House	May 30, 1975 (#75000515)	2104 Glenarm Pl. 39°44′54″N 104°59′01″W	Five Points	
147	Tramway Building	Tramway Building	January 5, 1978 (#78000854)	1100 14th St. 39°44′44″N 104°59′54″W	Central Business District	
148	Trinity United Methodist Church	Trinity United Methodist Church	July 28, 1970 (#70000161)	E. 18th Ave. and Broadway; 39°44′43″N 104°59′11″W	North Capitol Hill	
149	U.S. Courthouse and Federal Office Building	U.S. Courthouse and Federal Office Building	October 17, 2016 (#16000723)	1929–1961 Stout St. 39°44′57″N 104°59′20″W	Central Business District	
150	U.S. Customhouse	U.S. Customhouse	October 16, 1979 (#79000594)	721 19th St. 39°44′55″N 104°59′18″W	Central Business District	
151	U.S. Post Office and Federal Building	U.S. Post Office and Federal Building	March 20, 1973 (#73000470)	18th and Stout Sts. 39°44′55″N 104°59′23″W	Central Business District	
152	Union Station	Union Station	November 20, 1974 (#74000571)	17th St. at Wynkoop; 39°45′12″N 104°59′57″W	Union Station	
153	Union Warehouse	Union Warehouse	June 3, 1982 (#82002297)	1514 17th St. 39°45′06″N 104°59′52″W	Union Station	Now an assisted-living facility
154	US National Bank	US National Bank	March 25, 1994 (#94000264)	817 17th St. 39°44′49″N 104°59′28″W	Central Business District	
155	White Spot Restaurant	White Spot Restaurant	November 7, 2019 (#09000776)	601 East Colfax Ave. 39°44′24″N 104°58′47″W	North Capitol Hill	
156	Wood-Morris-Bonfils House	Wood-Morris-Bonfils House	December 4, 1974 (#74000573)	707 Washington St. 39°43′39″N 104°58′43″W	Capitol Hill	
157	Adolph J. Zang House	Adolph J. Zang House	November 14, 1979 (#79000596)	1532 Emerson St. 39°44′27″N 104°58′31″W	North Capitol Hill	
158	Adolph Zang Mansion	Adolph Zang Mansion	November 23, 1977 (#77000371)	709 Clarkson St. 39°43′39″N 104°58′39″W	Capitol Hill	
159	Zion Baptist Church	Zion Baptist Church	June 22, 2026 (#100013146)	933 E. 24th Avenue; 39°45′08″N 104°58′30″W	Five Points	

== Former listings ==
	Name on the Register	Image	Date listed	Date removed	Location	Description
1	14th Street Viaduct	14th Street Viaduct	February 4, 1985 (#85000200)	July 22, 1994	14th Street at Wazee	Demolished December 1989.
2	20th Street Viaduct	20th Street Viaduct	February 4, 1985 (#85000202)	July 22, 1994	20th Street at South Platte River	Demolished Fall 1993
3	Boettcher School for Crippled Children	Boettcher School for Crippled Children	February 20, 1991 (#91000070)	February 22, 1994	1900 Downing Street	Demolished February 8, 1993
4	Constitution Hall		August 25, 1970 (#70000159)	June 25, 1979	1507 Blake St.	Destroyed by fire in 1977
5	Thomas M. Field House		August 10, 1979 (#79000585)	December 18, 1989	2305 S. Washington St.	Destroyed by fire March 8, 1987
6	Ghost Building	Ghost Building	January 9, 1978 (#78000847)	September 7, 1979	500-518 15th St.	Dismantled September 7, 1979
7	Shorthorn Building		November 14, 1979 (#79000592)	February 27, 1995	2257 Larimer St.	Destroyed by fire December 1990

== See also ==
- List of National Register of Historic Places in Colorado
- List of National Register of Historic Places in Denver
- List of National Register of Historic Places in northeast Denver
- List of National Register of Historic Places in southeast Denver
- List of National Register of Historic Places in west Denver
- List of National Historic Landmarks in Colorado
- Bibliography of Colorado
- Geography of Colorado
- History of Colorado
- Index of Colorado-related articles
- List of Colorado-related lists
- Outline of Colorado
