= National Register of Historic Places listings in Denver =

Coordinates: 39.7392°N 104.9849°W

Location of the City and County of Denver in Colorado.

There are more than 300 properties and districts listed on the National Register of Historic Places in the City and County of Denver, the capital of the U.S. State of Colorado.

This National Park Service list is complete through NPS recent listings posted October 30, 2026.

== Number of listings by region ==
The properties are distributed across 48 of Denver's 79 official neighborhoods. For the purposes of this list, the city is split into four regions: West Denver, which includes all of the city west of the South Platte River; Downtown Denver, which includes the neighborhoods of Capitol Hill, Central Business District, Civic Center, Five Points, North Capitol Hill, and Union Station; and Northeast and Southeast Denver, which include the parts of the city east of the South Platte River (outside of Downtown Denver) that are north and south of Sixth Avenue respectively. Five sites are included in multiple regions.

	Region	# of Sites
1	Downtown Denver	159
2	Northeast Denver	76
3	Southeast Denver	49
4	West Denver	50
(Duplicates):		(6)
Total:		328

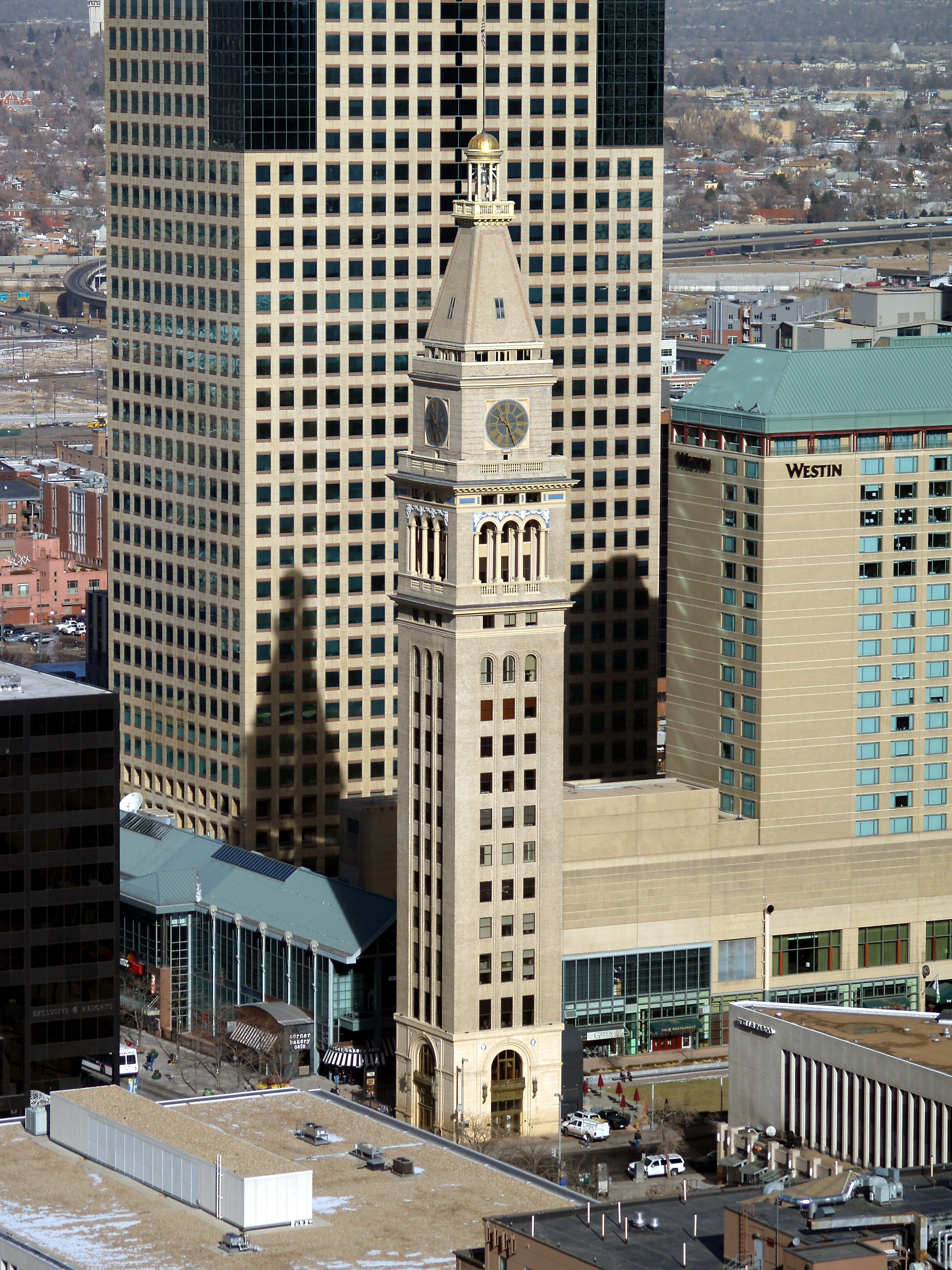
Daniels and Fisher Tower, Downtown. Constructed in 1910, it was the tallest building between the Mississippi River and California at the time.

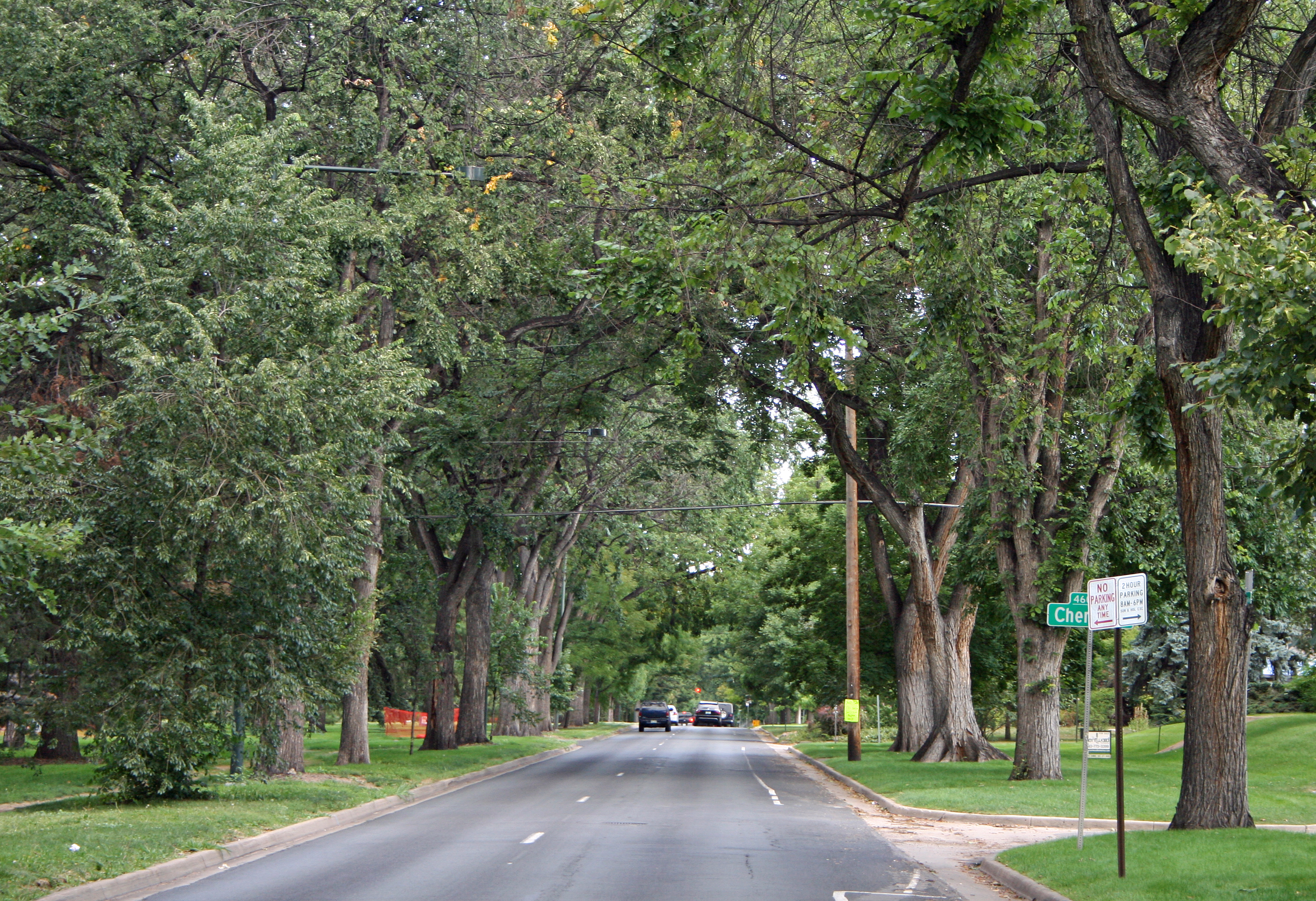
East Sixth Avenue Parkway, Southeast

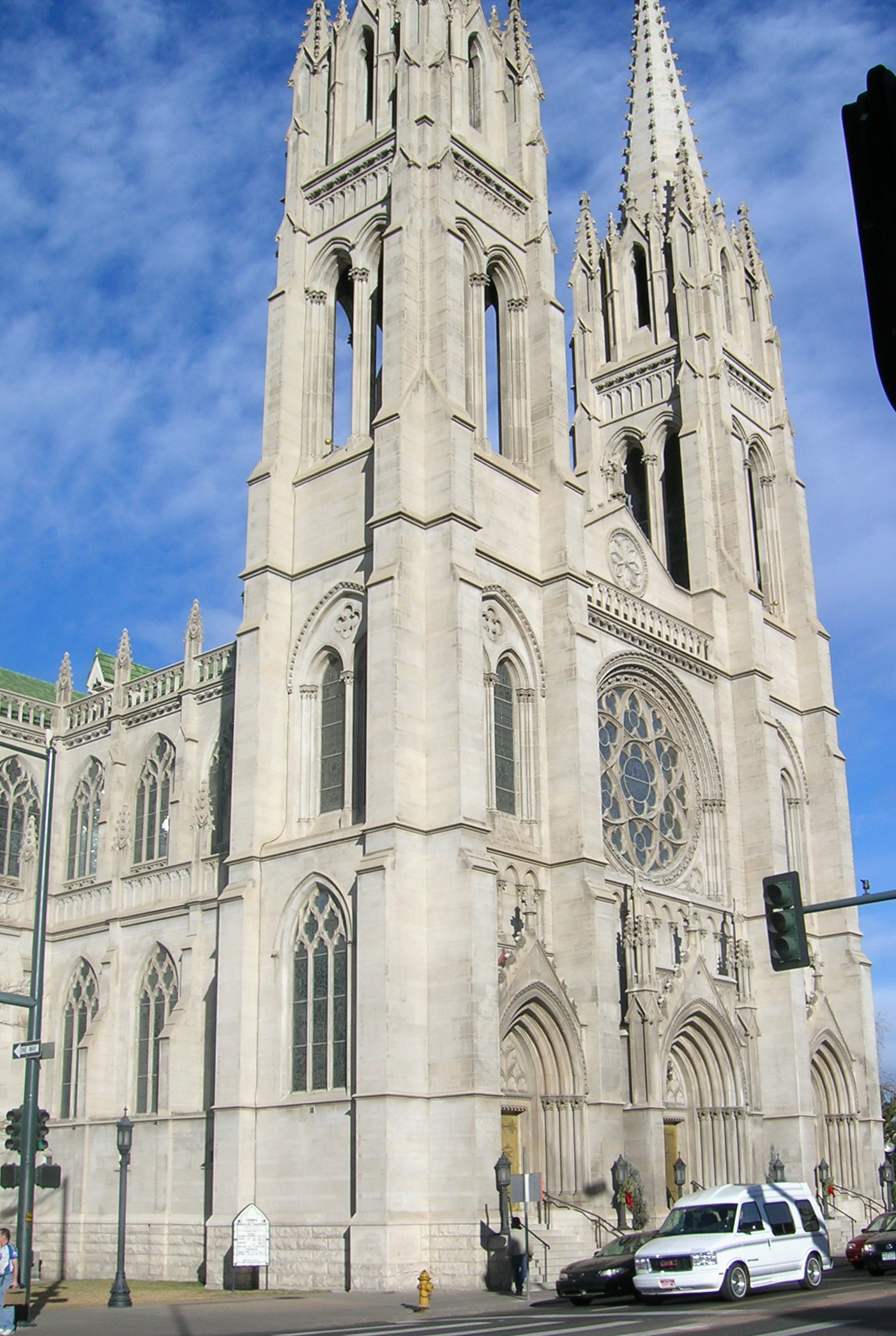
Cathedral of the Immaculate Conception, Downtown

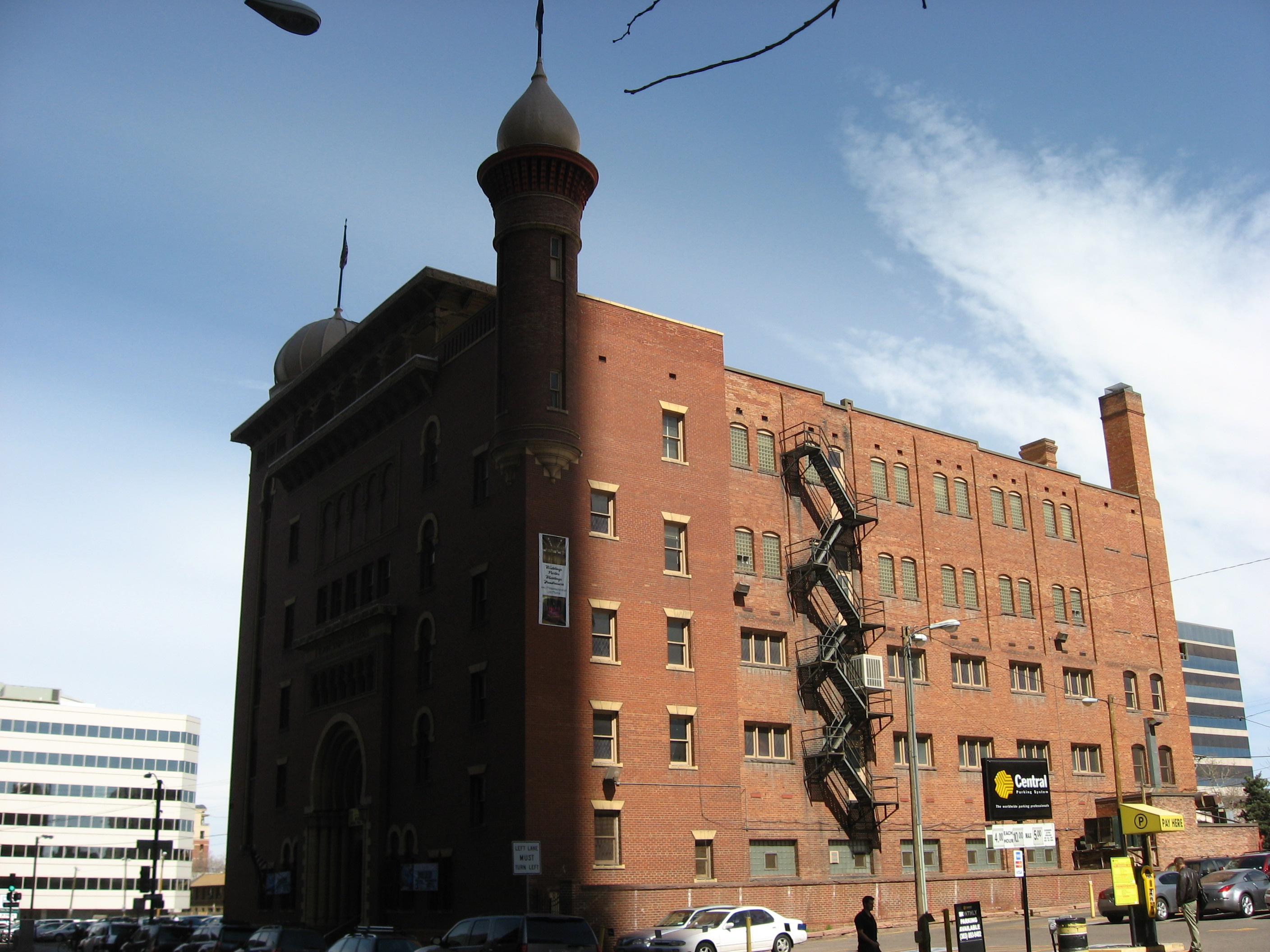
Mosque of the El Jebel Shrine, Downtown

== See also ==
- List of National Register of Historic Places in Colorado
- List of National Register of Historic Places in downtown Denver
- List of National Register of Historic Places in northeast Denver
- List of National Register of Historic Places in southeast Denver
- List of National Register of Historic Places in west Denver
- List of National Historic Landmarks in Colorado
- Bibliography of Colorado
- Geography of Colorado
- History of Colorado
- Index of Colorado-related articles
- List of Colorado-related lists
- Outline of Colorado
