= Baerresen Brothers =

Danish-American architects

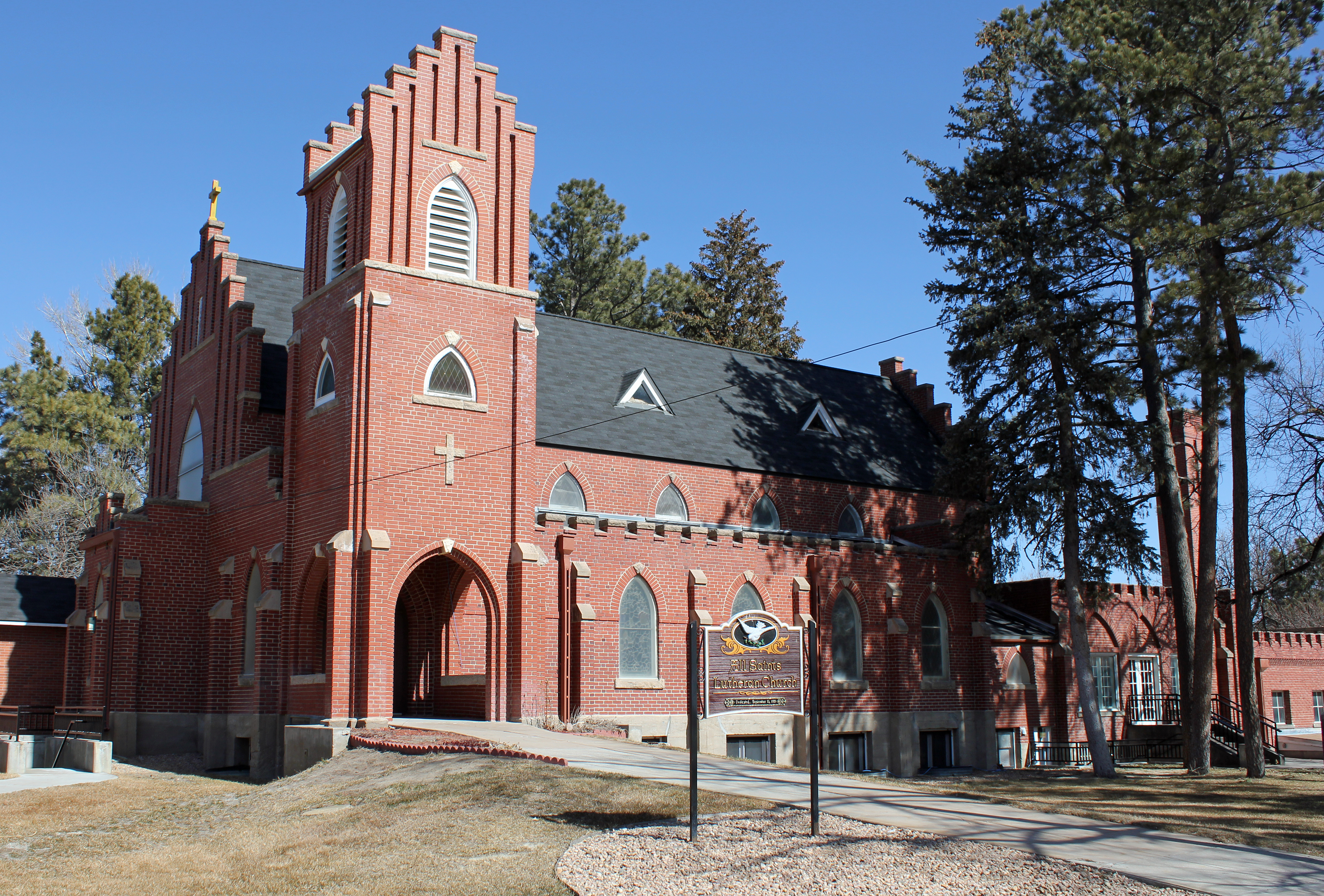
The All Saints Church of Eben Ezer, Brush, Colorado.

The Baerresen Brothers were Danish-born architects based in Denver, Colorado. A number of their works are listed on the U.S. National Register of Historic Places.

Both were born in Copenhagen, Denmark: Harold W. Baerresen was born January 20, 1846; Viggio Egede Baerresen was born on March 13, 1858. Harold W. began practice in Denver in 1879, forming a partnership with his brother in 1887. Harold W.'s son, Albert A. Baerresen, was also associated with his father's firm for many years, and operated a branch office in Cheyenne, Wyoming before establishing an independent practice in that city. From 1920 to 1922 he was in partnership with Frederic Hutchinson Porter. After Harold died in 1918, Viggio continued the firm until retiring in 1928.

Works by either or both include (with attribution):

- Denver City Railway Company Building (1883), 1635 17th St., 1734-1736 Wynkoop St. Denver, Colorado (Baerresen Brothers), NRHP-listed
- Romeo Block (1889), 2944 Zuni St., Denver, CO (Baerresen, H.W. & V.E.), NRHP-listed
- Hotel LaBonte (1913–14), 206 Walnut St., Douglas, WY (Baerresen Brothers), NRHP-listed
- Mosque of the El Jebel Shrine (1907), 1770 Sherman St., Denver, CO (Baerresen, Viggio), NRHP-listed
- All Saints Church of Eben Ezer (1916), 120 Hospital Rd. Brush, Colorado (Baerresen Brothers), NRHP-listed
- Platte County Courthouse (1917), 800 9th St., Wheatland, WY (Baerresen Brothers), NRHP-listed
