= Colburn Hotel =

Historic hotel in Colorado

- U.S. National Register of Historic Places
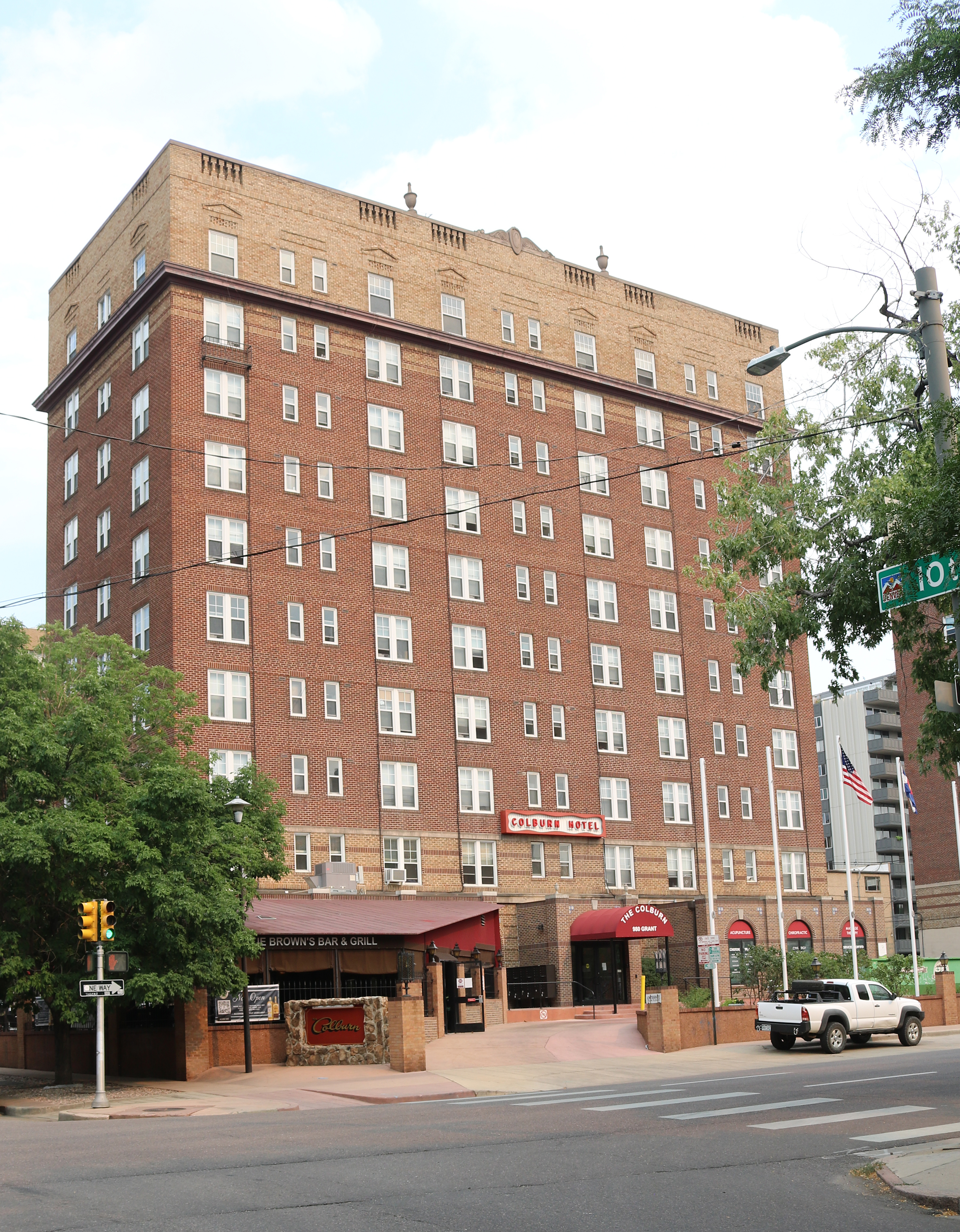
- Hotel in 2020

- Location within Colorado
- Location: 980 Grant St., Denver, Colorado
- Coordinates: 39.7318°N 104.9836°W
- Area: .57 acres (0.23 ha) (property)
- Built: 1925
- Architect: William N. Bowman
- NRHP reference No.: 100005391
- Added to NRHP: July 31, 2020

The Colburn Hotel, in the Capitol Hill neighborhood of Denver, Colorado, was built in 1925. It was listed on the National Register of Historic Places in 2020. In 1928 the hotel changed ownership.

== Description ==
The 10-story tripartite brick building was designed by architect William N. Bowman, who designed more than 30 buildings in Denver. The three-part design consists of the first and second floors which form the base which is clad in tan-colored brick. The shaft of the three part design extends from the third to the ninth floors, covered in red as well as tan brick. The capital forms the third element of the design, comprising the tenth floor and the attic floor, both of which are covered with tan brick.

The interior lobby includes plaster and gypsum walls, mirrored French doors and wall-to-wall carpeting. Each floor has eleven small apartments ranging from 250 to 300 square feet, some of which have en suite bathrooms, while others share bathrooms with honeycomb-shaped tile floors.

A bar began operating on the first floor in the mid-1940s. After a long dispute, the hotel was finally granted a liquor license by ruling of the Colorado Supreme Court. In 2022, it was still in operation as Charlie Brown's Bar and Grill.

During the summer of 1947, Neal Cassady, Jack Kerouac and Allen Ginsberg reportedly spent time there. It became "Charlie Brown's" in 1964, and remains open in 2019.

The hotel fell into underuse in the late 1970s, and in 1989 it stopped operating as a hotel. Between 2018–19 an 8-million dollar renovation that transformed the structure into low-income housing, funded by Federal Historic Tax Credits. The lobby, hallways and floor-plans maintain their historical character.

In 2021 the historic hotel was operating as a transitional housing building.
