= Platte County Courthouse (Wyoming) =

- U.S. National Register of Historic Places
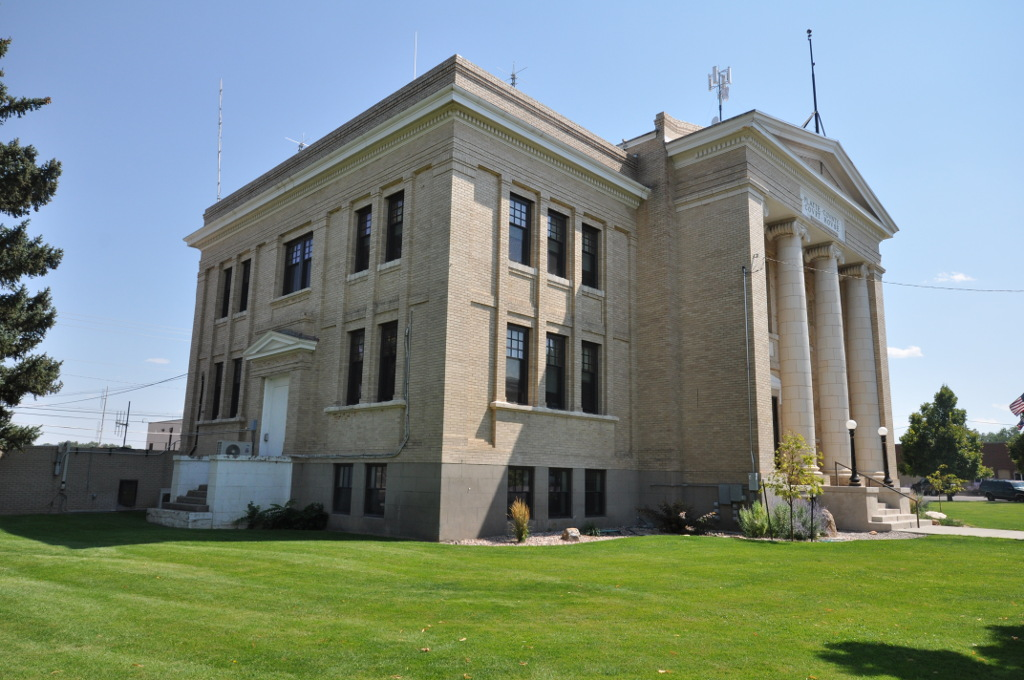

- Location within Wyoming Location within the United States
- Location: 800 9th Street, Wheatland, Wyoming
- Coordinates: 42°03′20″N 104°57′11″W
- Area: 1.3 acres (0.53 ha)
- Built: 1917-18
- Built by: Archie Allison
- Architect: Baerresen Brothers
- Architectural style: Classical Revival
- NRHP reference No.: 08001004
- Added to NRHP: October 15, 2008

The Platte County Courthouse, at 800 9th Street in Wheatland, Wyoming, was built in 1917–18. It was listed on the National Register of Historic Places in 2008. It is Classical Revival in style. Designed by the Baerresen Brothers architects, it is a two-story buff-colored brick and concrete building. Its west-facing facade is pedimented.

In 2018 it hosts the Circuit Court of the Eighth Judicial District.
