= Curtis–Champa Streets Historic District =

Historic district in Colorado, United States

- Curtis–Champa Streets District
- U.S. National Register of Historic Places
- U.S. Historic district
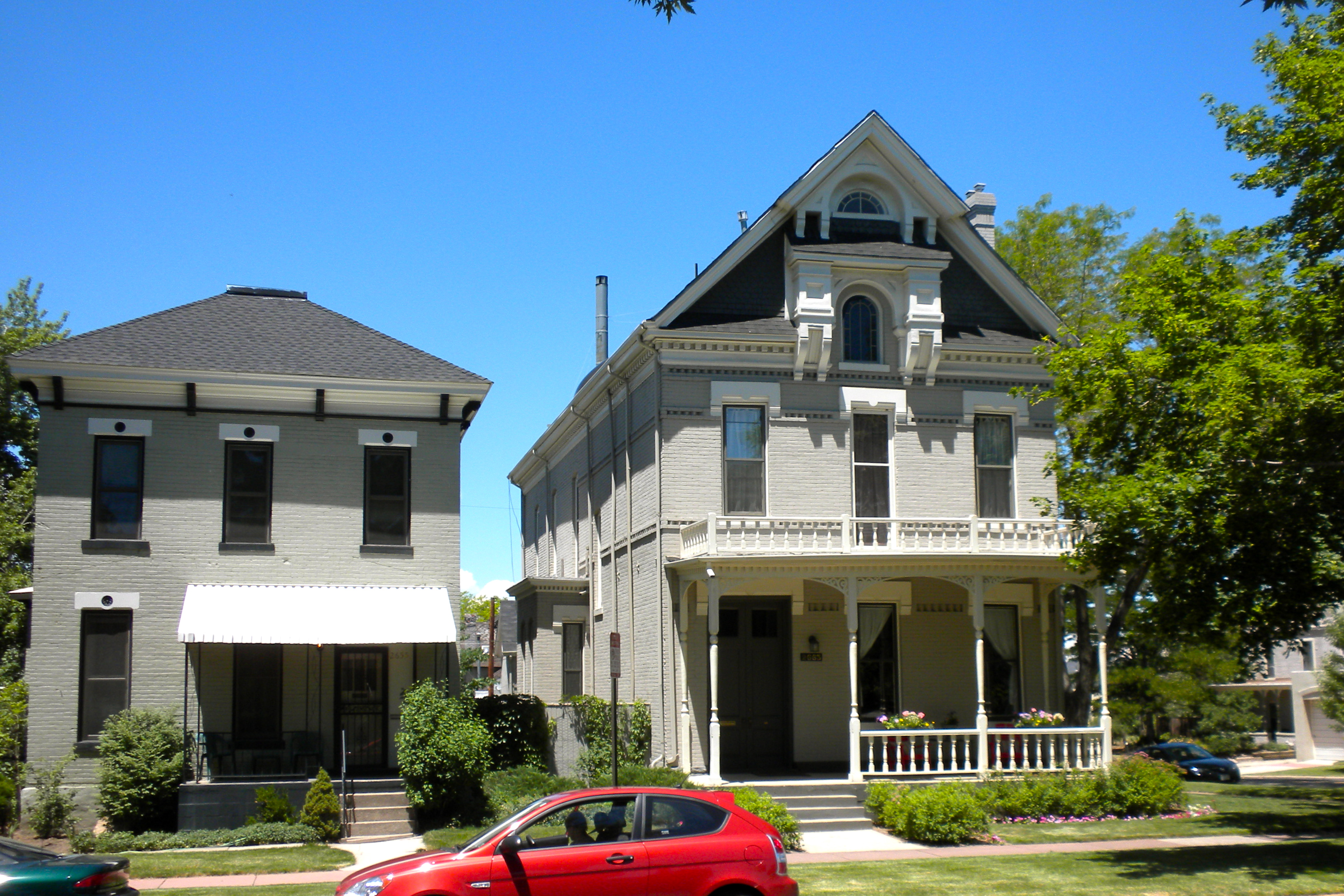
- Champa Street at 27th in Denver

- Location within Colorado Location within the United States
- Location: Roughly bounded by Arapahoe, 30th, California, and 24th Sts., Denver, Colorado
- Coordinates: 39.75683°N 104.98065°W
- Area: 87 acres (35 ha)
- Built: 1870
- Architectural style: Mixed (more Than 2 Styles From Different Periods)
- NRHP reference No.: 75000507
- Added to NRHP: April 1, 1975

Curtis–Champa Streets Historic District is located in Denver, Colorado. It was added to the National Register of Historic Places in 1975 and is bounded by Arapahoe, 30th, California, and 24th Sts. covering 870 acres and 356 buildings. In 1983 the boundaries were expanded to roughly 30th, Stout, Downing and Arapahoe Sts., covering 870 acres and 77 buildings.

== See also ==
- National Register of Historic Places listings in downtown Denver, Colorado
- Auraria 9th Street Historic District
