= Montgomery Court (Denver) =

- U.S. National Register of Historic Places
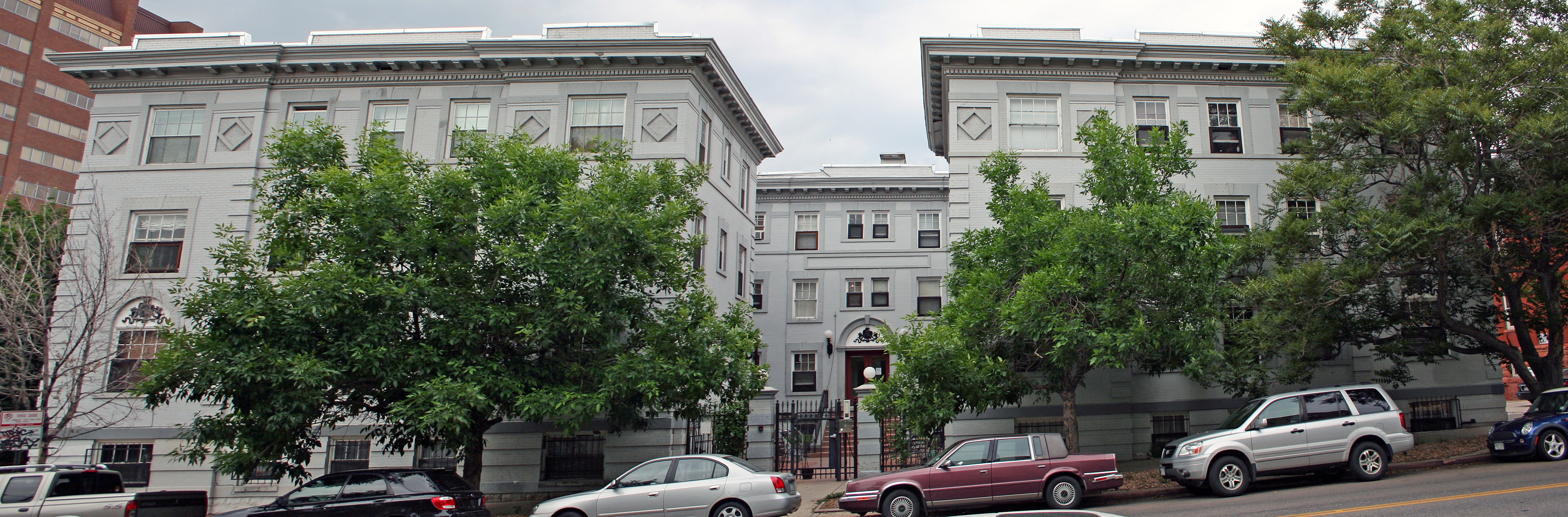

- Location within Colorado
- Location: 215 E. 11th Ave., Denver, Colorado
- Coordinates: 39.73410°N 104.98449°W
- Area: less than one acre
- Built: 1908
- Built by: Alexander Mathers; Cecil Walker
- Architectural style: Renaissance Revival
- NRHP reference No.: 86002810
- Added to NRHP: October 2, 1986

Montgomery Court, at 215 E. Eleventh Ave. in the Capitol Hill neighborhood of Denver, Colorado, was built in 1908. It was listed on the National Register of Historic Places in 1986.

It is a 45-unit brick apartment building, built in a modified Renaissance Revival style. It was built by contractors Alexander Mathers and Cecil Walker.
