= People's Fair =

Coordinates: 39°44′21″N 104°59′19″W

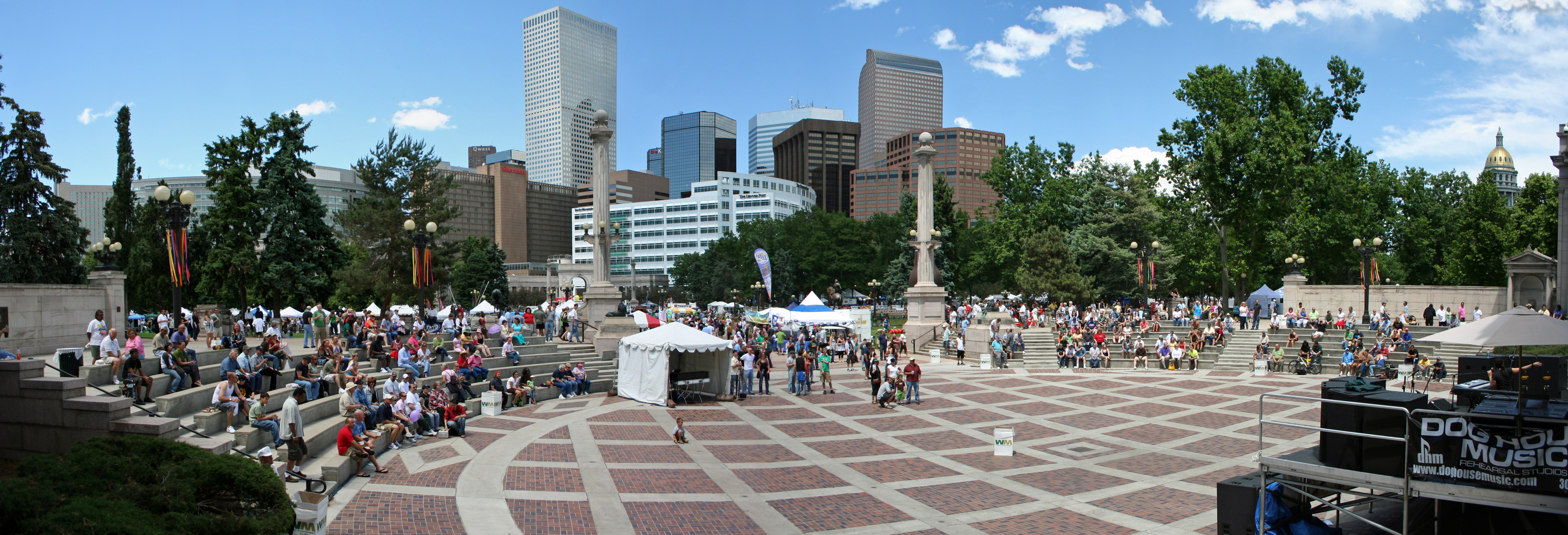
The concert venue at the People's Fair.

The People's Fair was an annual event, held in early June, in Civic Center Park in Denver, Colorado, United States It was sponsored by Capitol Hill United Neighborhoods (CHUN).

The People's Fair was one of several free events held annually in Denver. The first People's Fair was held in 1972 at Morey Junior High School (now Morey Middle School), with 2,000 in attendance. Within five years, the fair had outgrown its home and moved to East High School. In 1987, the fair moved to Civic Center Park between the Colorado State Capitol and the City and County Building.

At its peak the fair had about 500 vendor booths. Some sell food, but the focus of the juried event was on arts and crafts. CHUN described it as "Colorado's Premier Arts and Crafts Festival". Throughout the event, several bands perform on stages, and carnival rides are set up in one portion of the fair's grounds.

Part of the mission of the People's Fair was to fund community non-profit organizations. This was accomplished via the beverage booths, staffed by volunteers whose respective organizations receive a portion of the profits from sales.

The last People's fair was held in 2018. In 2019 it was announced that the event would be canceled in 2019.
