= Romeo Block =

- U.S. National Register of Historic Places
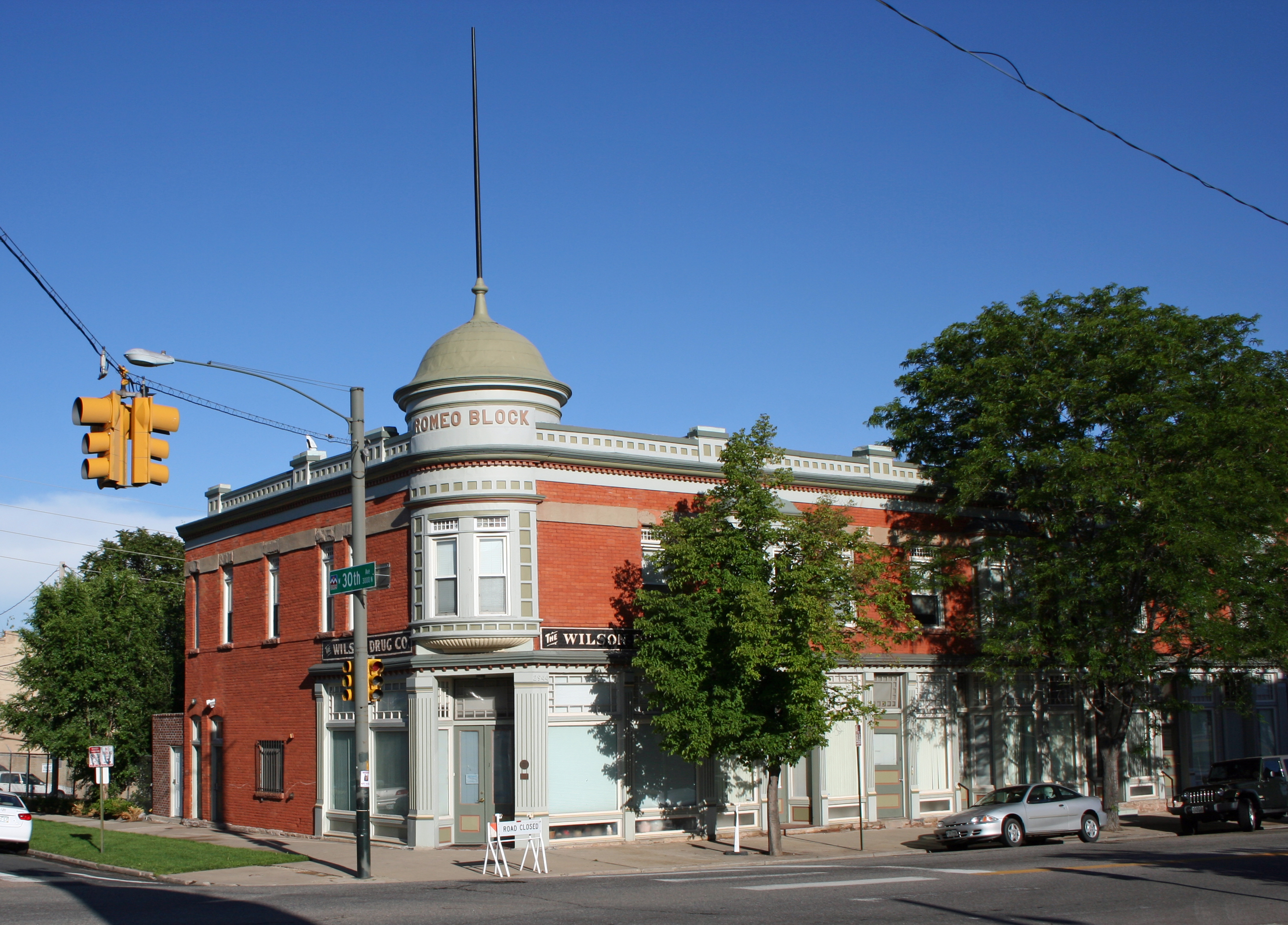
- The Romeo Block building in Denver, Colorado
- Location: 2944 Zuni St., Denver, Colorado
- Coordinates: 39°45′33″N 105°00′54″W
- Area: less than one acre
- Built: 1889
- Architect: Baerresen, H.W. & V.E.
- NRHP reference No.: 95001485
- Added to NRHP: January 4, 1996

The Romeo Block, located at 2944 Zuni St. in Denver, Colorado, was built in 1889. It was listed on the National Register of Historic Places in 1996.

It was designed in 1889 by the Baerresen Brothers, Harold and Viggio, for use by five storefronts on the street level, as a rooming house on the second floor, and possibly also as a blacksmith shop in the basement.
