= Ghost Building =

Building in Denver, Colorado

Coordinates: 39°44′52.3″N 104°59′28″W

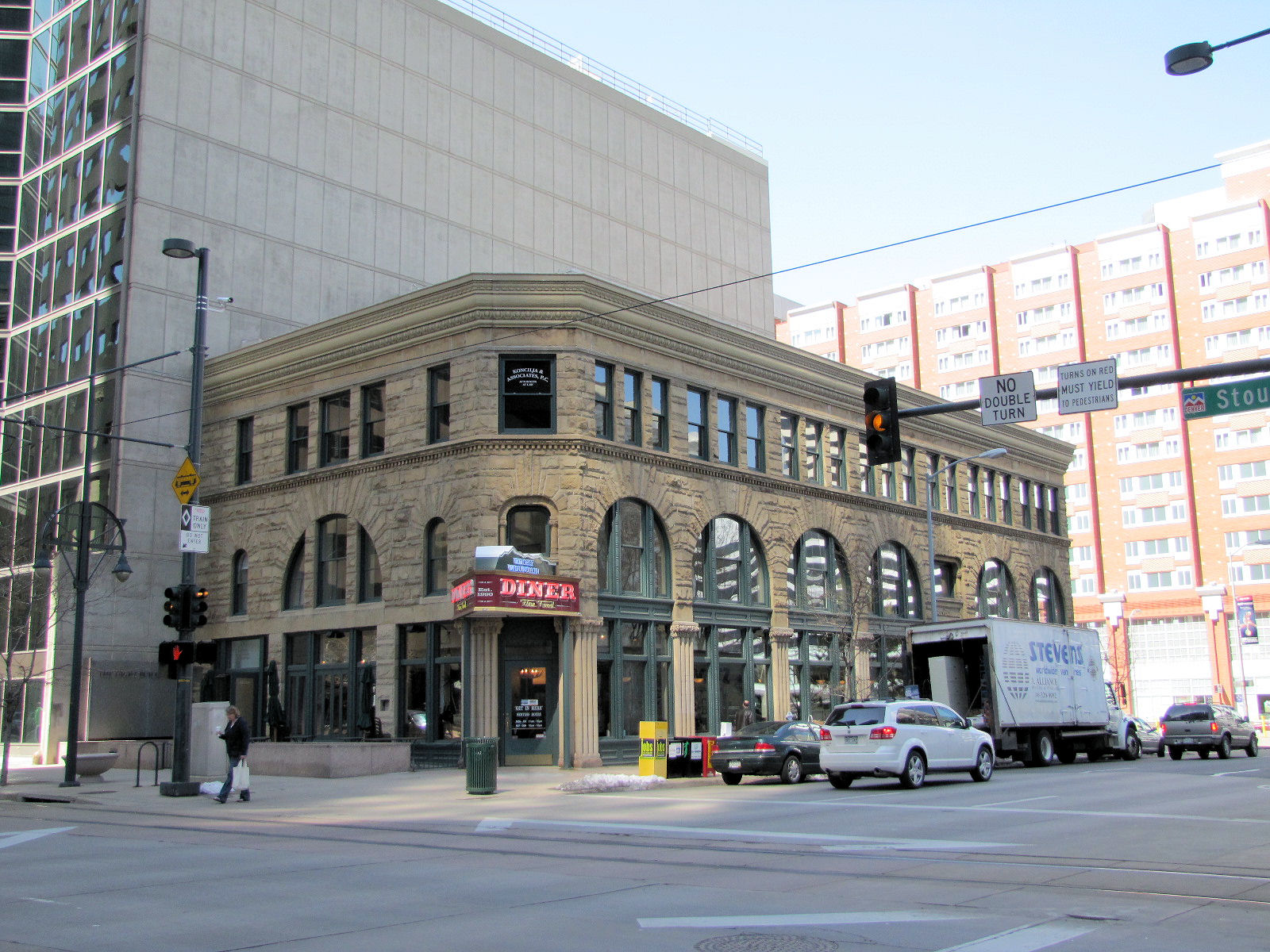
- Interactive map of the Ghost Building area

General information
- Location: Denver, Colorado, U.S.
- Opened: 1984

Design and construction
- Architect: William A. Lang

The Ghost Building is a building in Denver, Colorado, United States, that is a reconstruction of an earlier historic building. It was originally built at 15th and Glenarm Streets in 1889 for real estate developer Allen M. Ghost by architect William A. Lang, better known for designing the Molly Brown House. When this building, listed in the National Register of Historic Places #78000847, was threatened with demolition in the 1970s, Denver architect Brian T. Congleton proposed disassembling the facade and reassembling it elsewhere. After nearly a decade in storage, Brown-Schrepferman reassembled this historic building on the corner of 18th and Stout in downtown Denver in 1984. The building was reconstructed using the original details and stone facade, around a modern steel structure. The current manifestation of the building is not listed in the National Register of Historic Places.
