= Bouvier-Lothrop House =

- U.S. National Register of Historic Places
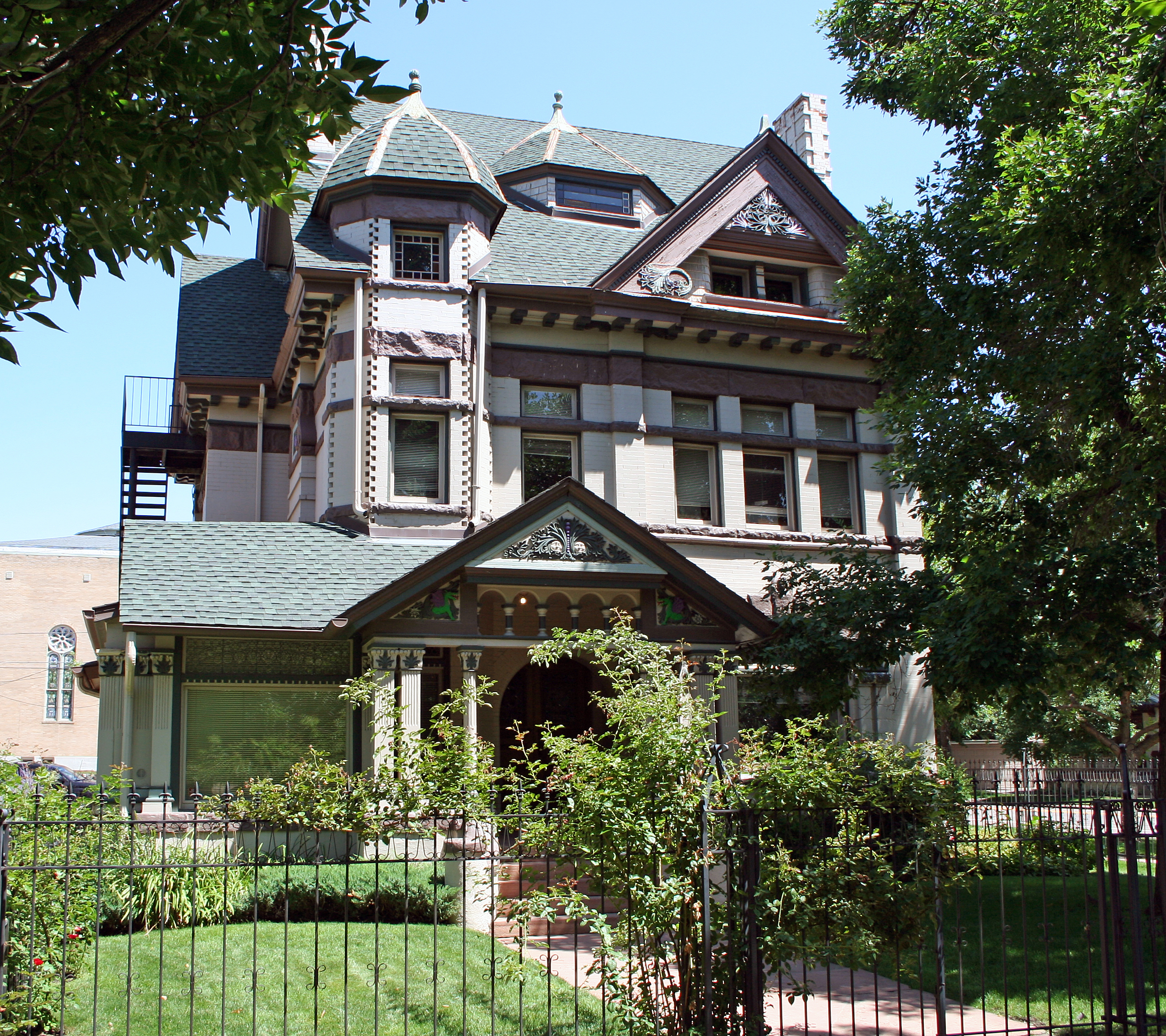
- The house in 2009

- Location within Colorado Location within the United States
- Location: 1600 Emerson Street, Denver, Colorado
- Coordinates: 39°44′31″N 104°58′34″W
- Built: 1890
- Architect: Balcomb and Rice
- Architectural style: Queen Anne
- NRHP reference No.: 80000886
- Added to NRHP: September 4, 1980

The Bouvier-Lothrop House is a historic house located at 1600 Emerson Street in Denver, Colorado. Built in 1890, it was added to the National Register of Historic Places on September 4, 1980.

The 2 1/2-story, Queen Anne style house was designed by partners Robert G. Balcomb and Eugene R. Rice. Balcomb was a carpenter who came to Denver in 1885, while Rice was a trained architect. The two worked together under the name Balcomb and Rice—later Balcomb and Rice Real Estate Company—from 1886 to 1897.

The house is named for Michel Charles Bouvier and Wilbur C. Lothrop. Bouvier was the owner of the house from 1891 to 1921. Lothrop, one of the house's tenants, helped establish the public school system in Colorado.

== See also ==
- Flower-Vaile House, another Queen Anne house designed by Balcomb and Rice, located next door at 1610 Emerson Street.
