= Denver City Cable Railway Building =

- U.S. National Register of Historic Places
- Colorado State Register of Historic Properties
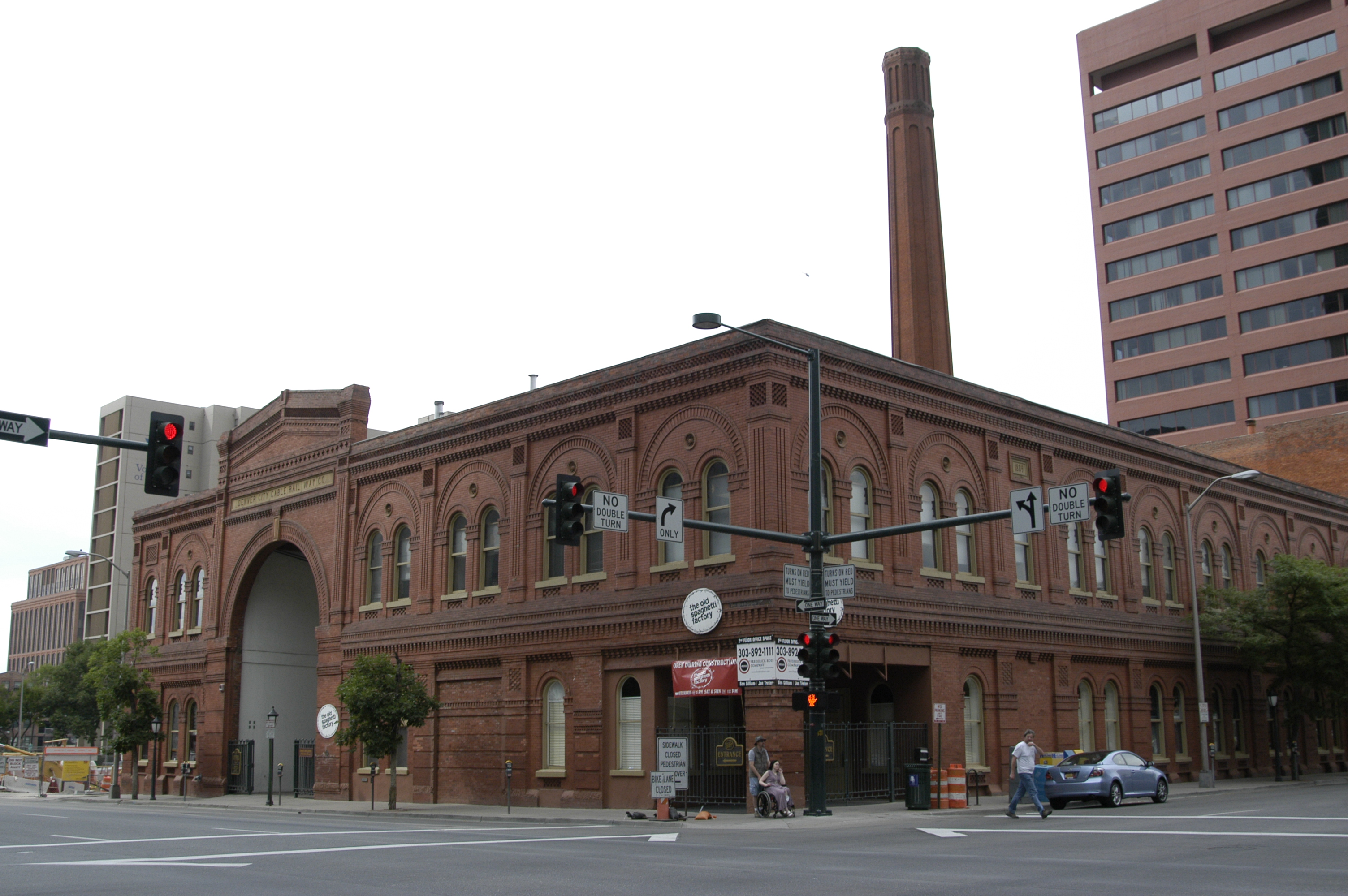

- Location within Colorado Location within the United States
- Location: Denver, Colorado
- Coordinates: 39°45′1.92″N 104°59′37.73″W
- Built: 1889
- NRHP reference No.: 79000581
- CSRHP No.: 5DV.117
- Added to NRHP: July 2, 1979

The Denver City Cable Railway Building on Lawrence Street in Denver, Colorado, opened in 1889. Originally built to house power and maintenance facilities for Denver's cable car system, it now houses a restaurant and office space. It was added to the National Register of Historic Places in 1979. The current owner is Jim Judd.

== History ==
=== 1970s ===
The building was bought by Jim Judd and a partner in 1972 in the hopes of saving the building from being torn down in an urban renewal project. In 1973, the Old Spaghetti Factory opened on the first floor.

=== 2000s ===
In March 2007, the sale of the building from Mr. Judd to Central Development was announced. Central Development plans a $35 million hotel and retail project that will include the current building. Designed by the Buchanan Yonushewski Group the new hotel will have a glass facade and will wrap around the current building.
