= Downtown Denver =

Human settlement in Denver, Colorado, United States

Coordinates: 39°44′45″N 104°59′34″W

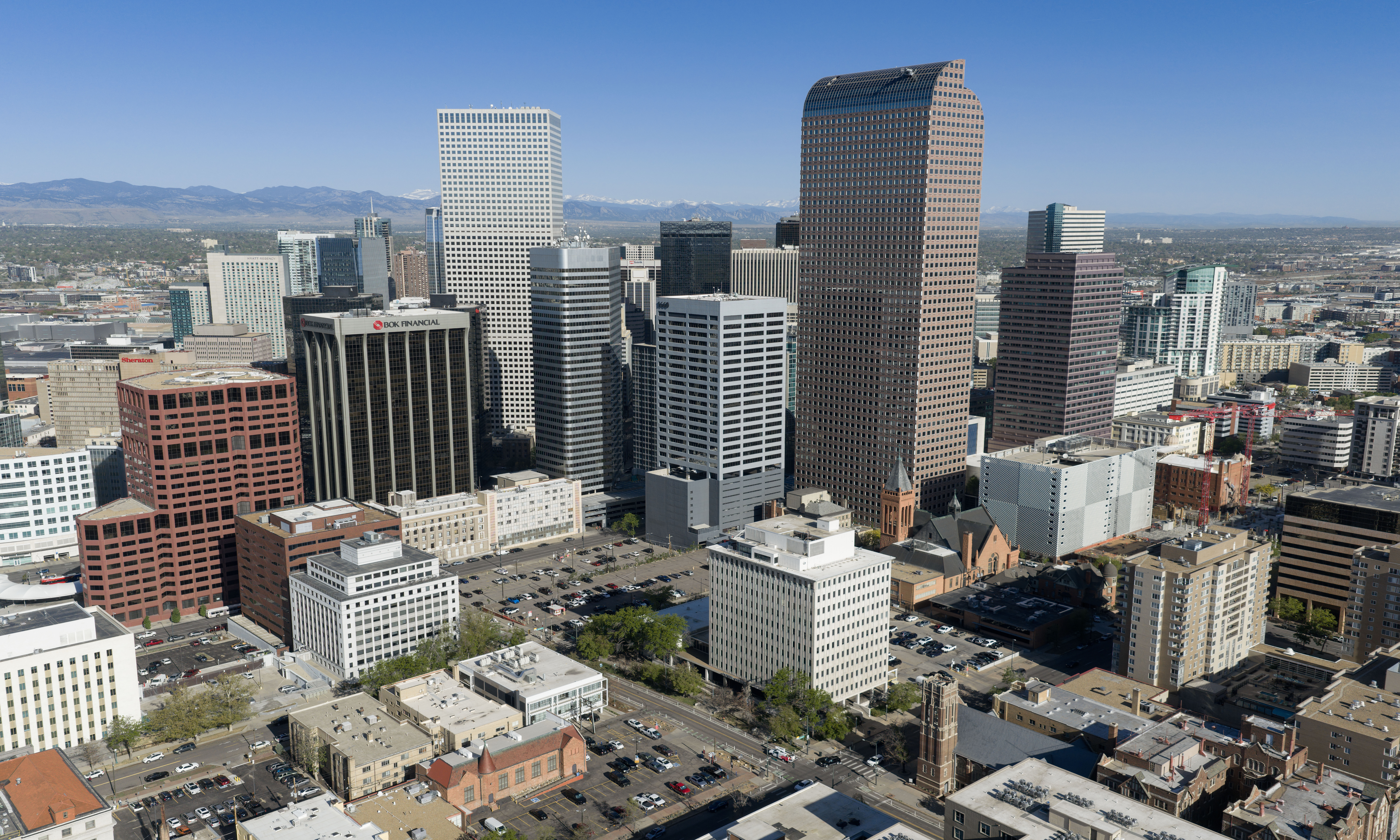
Downtown Denver

Downtown Denver is the main financial, commercial, business, and entertainment district in Denver, Colorado, United States. There is over 23 million square feet (2,100,000 m^{2}) of office space in downtown Denver, with 132,000 workers. The downtown area consists mostly of the neighborhoods of Union Station and Central Business District. LoDo and RiNo are notable districts within downtown. Some of the more popular specific attractions include the 16th Street pedestrian mall, Larimer Square, the re-emerging Theatre District near Curtis and 14th, and Civic Center Park. Surrounding neighborhoods include Capitol Hill and Uptown to the east, Highland to the west, Five Points to the north, and the Golden Triangle to the south.

== Overview ==
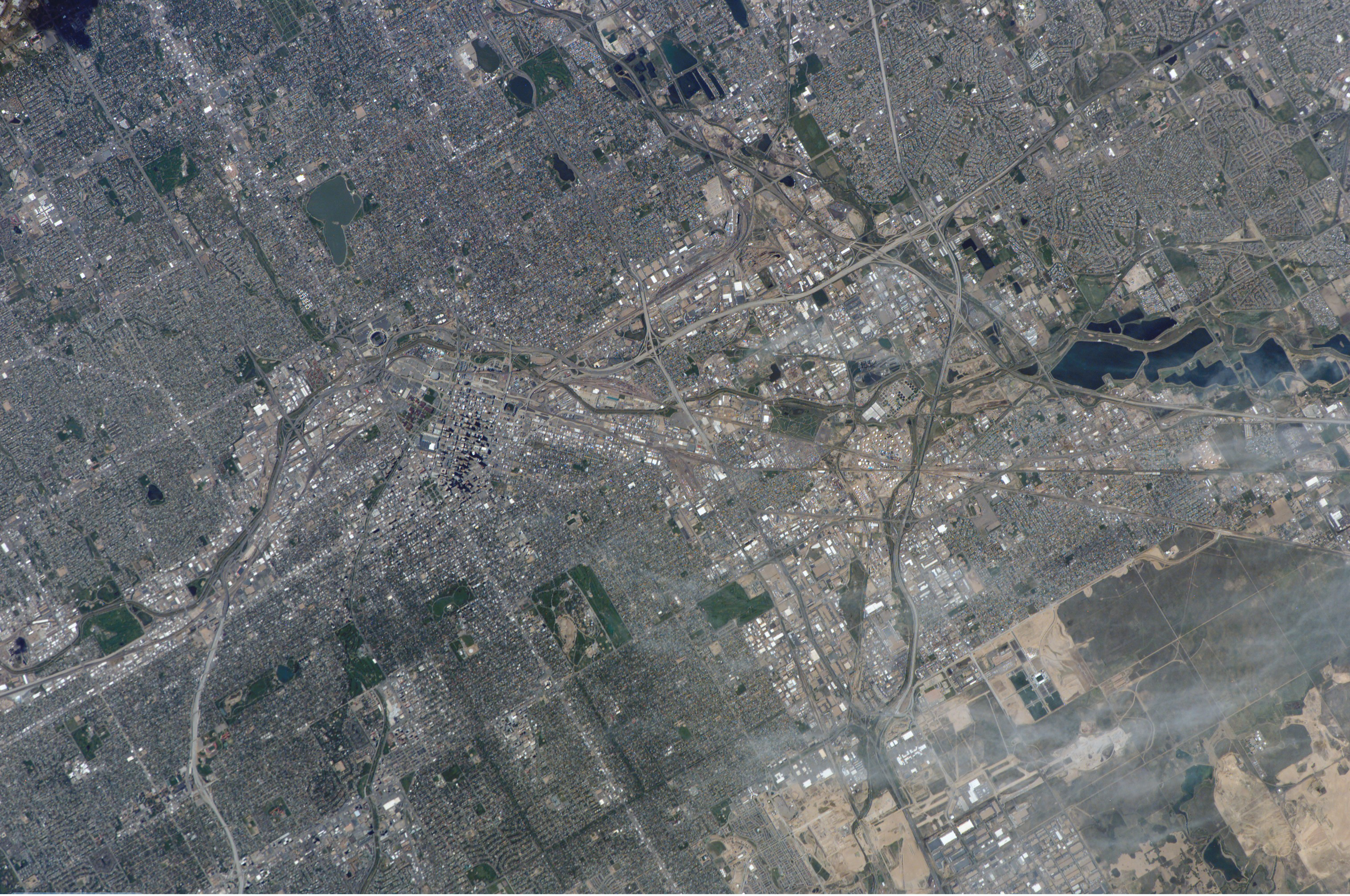
Astronaut's photograph of Denver, Colorado, taken from the International Space Station. North is to the upper right of the image.

As of 2023, there are 52 buildings in the downtown area reaching over 300 ft (91 m). 3 buildings over 300 ft are currently under construction. See the List of tallest buildings in Denver.

== Entertainment ==
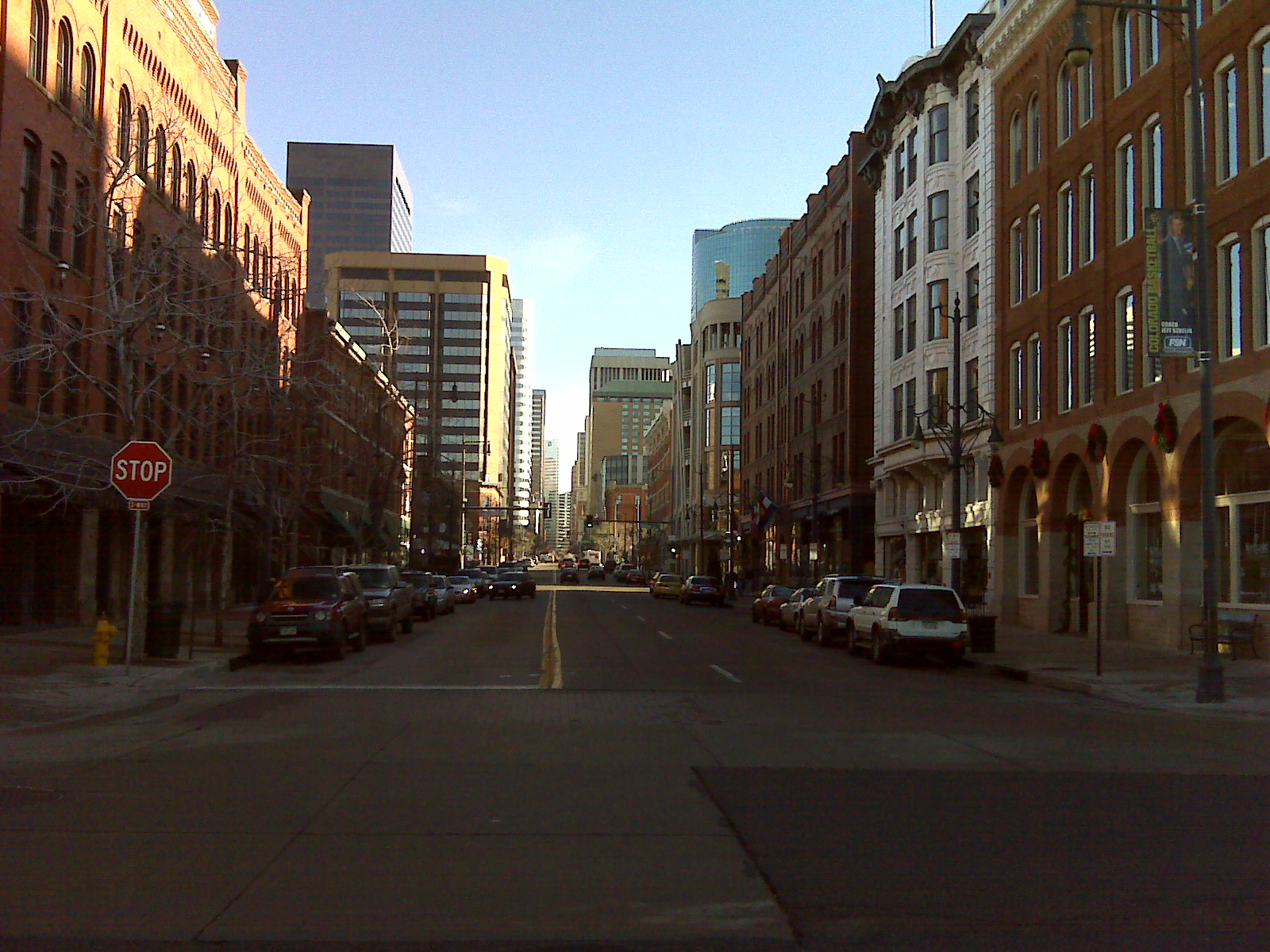
Looking down 17th Street

Denver has made a strong effort to centralize its commercial and entertainment interests in the downtown area. Currently, it is home to both Coors Field and Ball Arena, and roughly a mile from nearby Empower Field at Mile High. LoDo and the 16th Street mall are home to hundreds of bars, restaurants, and cafes, attracting many residents from the metro area and supporting the 30,000 plus residents living in the central business district. Additionally, Downtown Denver is home to the second largest performing arts center in the United States.

== Federal District ==
Downtown Denver also houses a smaller Federal District consisting of four blocks around Champa, Stout, 19th and 20th streets. This district contains a federal courthouse, the Byron G. Rogers Federal Building, a U.S. Court of Appeals, and a US Customs House.

== See also ==
- Bibliography of Colorado
- Geography of Colorado
- History of Colorado
- Index of Colorado-related articles
- List of Colorado-related lists
  - List of neighborhoods in Denver
  - List of populated places in Colorado
- Outline of Colorado
