= John Elsner House =

- U.S. National Register of Historic Places
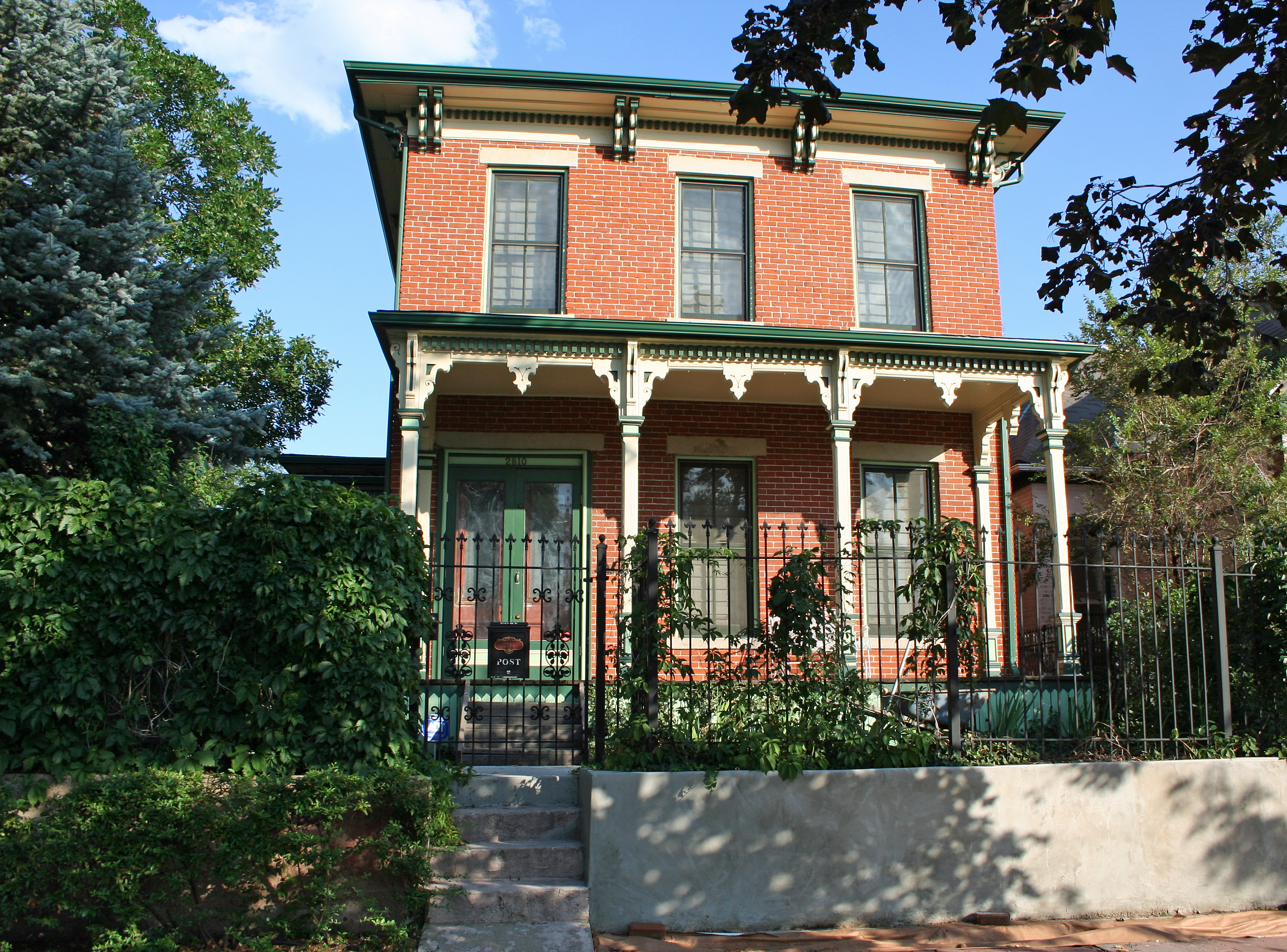
- The house in 2009

- Location within Colorado Location within the United States
- Location: 2810 Arapahoe Street, Denver, Colorado
- Coordinates: 39°45′33″N 104°58′51″W
- Built: 1872
- Architectural style: Italianate
- NRHP reference No.: 79000583
- Added to NRHP: December 17, 1979

The John Elsner House is an Italianate-style house located at 2810 Arapahoe Street in Denver, Colorado. It was added to the National Register of Historic Places on December 17, 1979.

The house was commissioned in 1872 by Denver physician John Elsner. Elsner was an important early figure in the Denver medical community, having arrived in the city in 1866 when it had a population of only about 4,000 people. In 1870, he was appointed Denver's first county physician and created the first county hospital, which operated out of a small shelter. He played a vital role in organizing the Denver Medical Society in 1871 and assisted in the establishment of the National Jewish Hospital. He was also known to work with local Native American tribes.
