= Sherman Street Event Center =

- Mosque of the El Jebel Shrine
- U.S. National Register of Historic Places
- Colorado State Register of Historic Properties
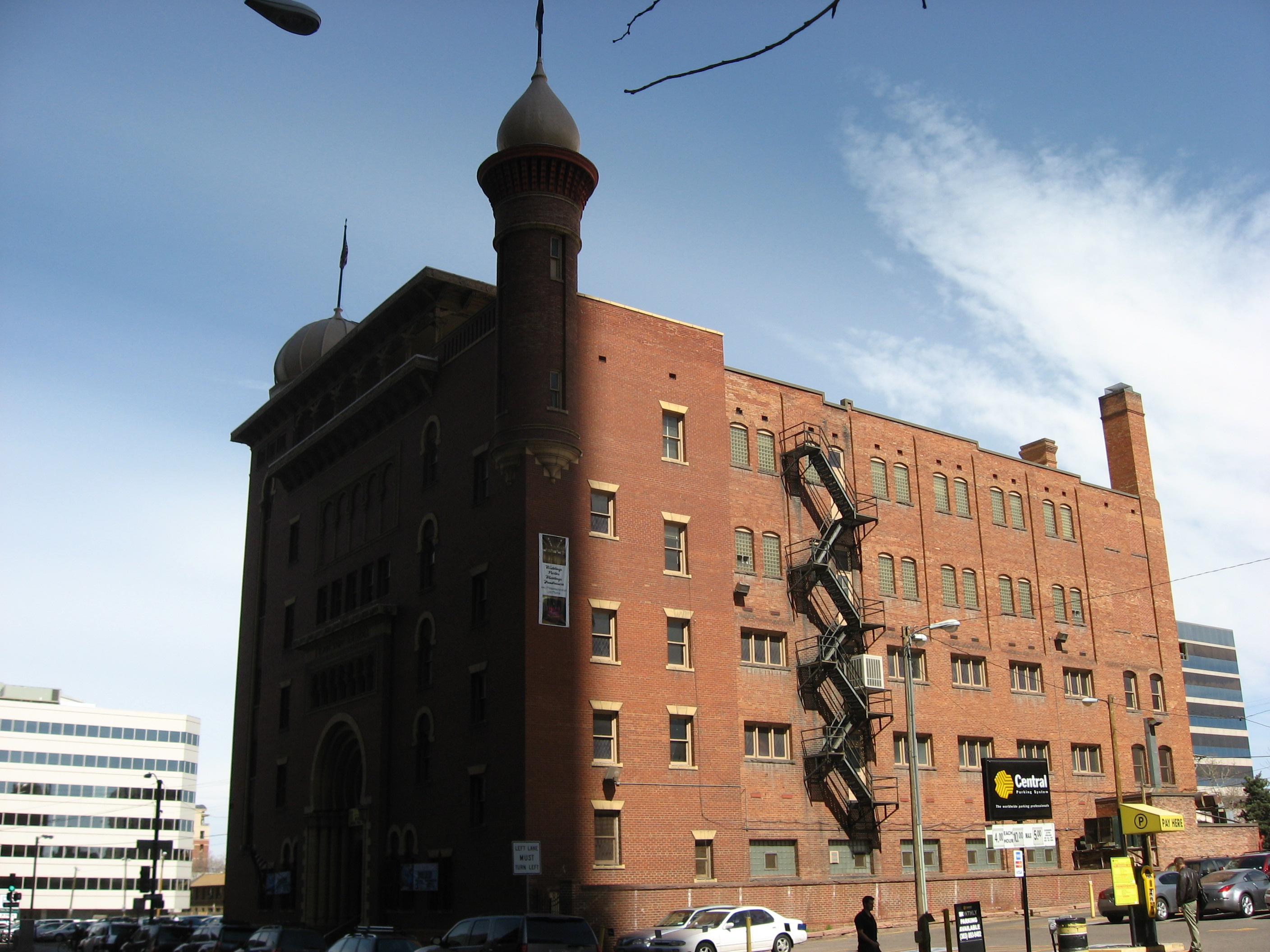
- Front and southern side of the building

- Location within Colorado Location within the United States
- Location: 1770 Sherman St., Denver, Colorado
- Coordinates: 39°44′41″N 104°59′2″W
- Area: 0.9 acres (0.36 ha)
- Built: 1907
- Architect: Viggo Baerresen; Harold Baerressen
- Architectural style: Late 19th and 20th Century Revivals, Moorish Revival; Egyptian Revival
- NRHP reference No.: 97001235
- CSRHP No.: 5DV.2892
- Added to NRHP: October 24, 1997

The Mosque of the El Jebel Shrine, which has also been known as the Rocky Mountain Consistory, and as the Scottish Rite Temple is a historic building in the North Capitol Hill neighborhood of downtown Denver. It was for a period known as Sherman Street Event Center

The Moorish-inspired building was constructed in 1907, as a meeting hall for the El Jabel chapter of the Ancient Arabic Order of the Nobles of the Mystic Shrine (the Shriners). It has never been a true mosque in the Islamic sense. In 1924, having outgrown the building, the Shriners sold it to the Scottish Rite Masons, who renamed it. In 1995, the Scottish Rite sold the building to Eulipions, Inc. who converted it into a catering and events facility.

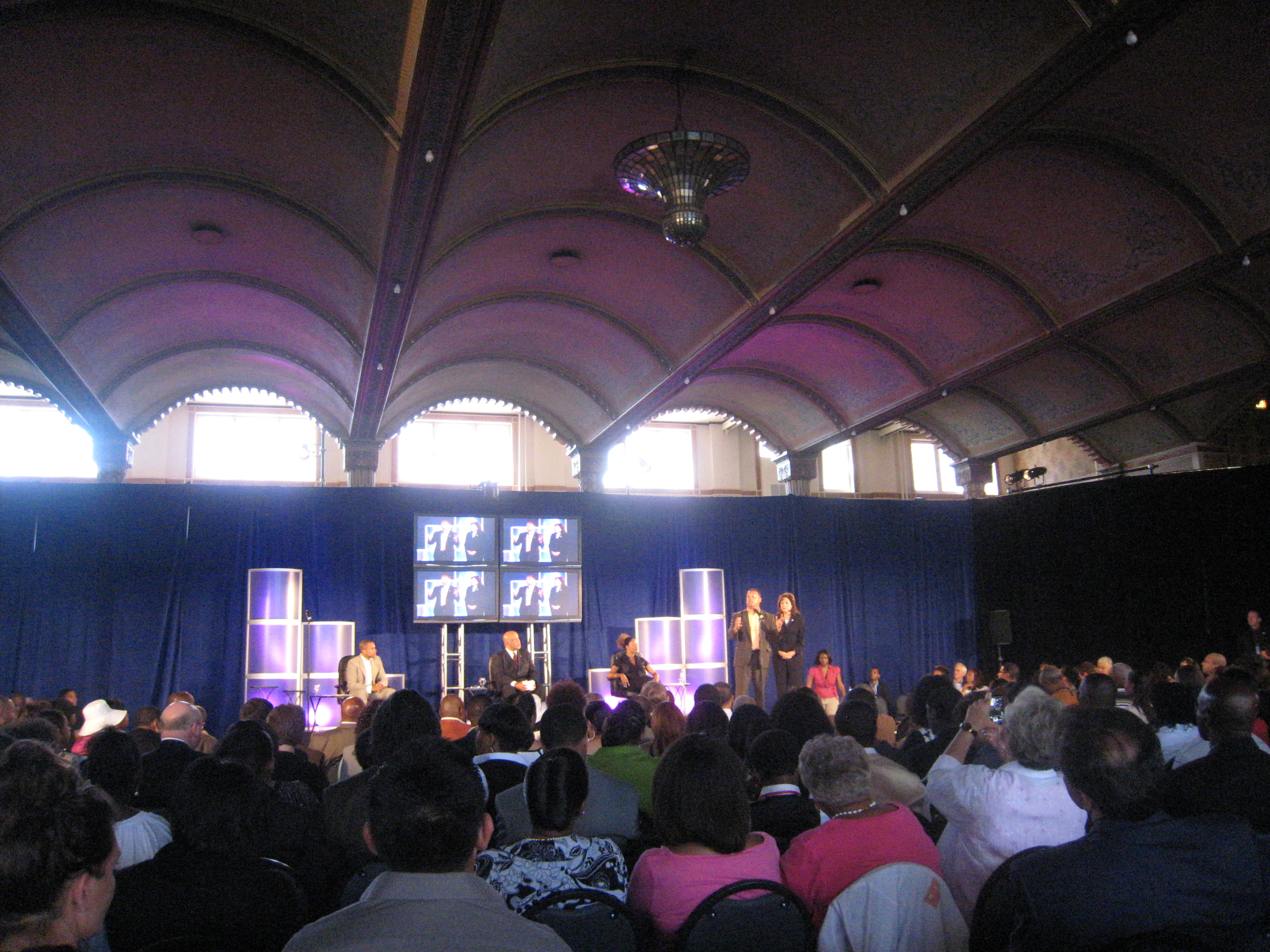
Congressional Black Caucus holds a summit inside the Sherman Street Event Center during the 2008 Democratic National Convention

It was known as the Scottish Rite Temple despite the fact that it never served as a Scottish Rite meeting hall.

== See also ==
- Masonic Temple Building, at 1614 Welton St. in Denver's central business district
