= Capitol Hill, Denver =

Capitol Hill, Denver, Colorado
- Denver neighborhood
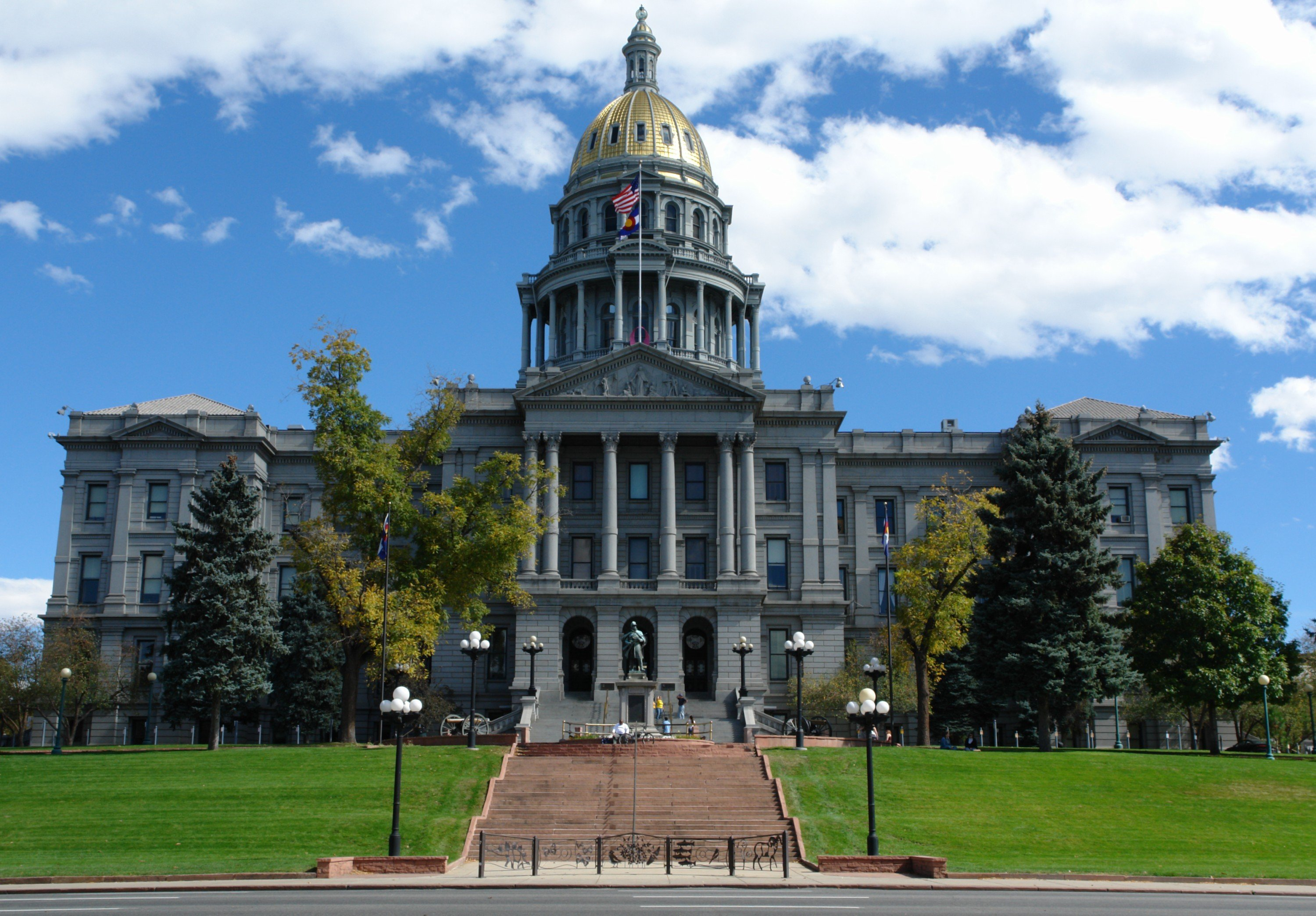
- Colorado State Capitol Building, at the western edge of the Capitol Hill neighborhood
- Interactive map of Capitol Hill, Denver, Colorado
- Coordinates: 39.7338°N 104.9823°W
- Country: United States
- State: Colorado
- City and County: Denver

Area
  - Total: 1.6 km^{2} (0.6 sq mi)
- Elevation: 1,608 m (5,277 ft)

Population (2020)
  - Total: 16,675
  - Density: 10,731/km^{2} (27,792/sq mi)
- Postal codes: 80203, 80218

The Capitol Hill neighborhood of the City and County of Denver, Colorado, United States, is bordered by Broadway, Downing Street, Colfax Avenue, and Seventh Avenue, which carry large volumes of traffic around the neighborhood. It is technically located in East Denver which begins immediately east of Broadway, the neighborhood's western boundary. Many consider the Cheesman Park neighborhood to be a part of the Capitol Hill neighborhood, but as defined by the city, Cheesman Park is a separate neighborhood. Denver also recognizes a statistical neighborhood called North Capitol Hill, also known as Uptown by some residents. Colfax Avenue is the border between these two neighborhoods.

== History ==
The neighborhood was originally the home of Denver's elite who constructed elaborate mansions. As the economy of Denver slumped after the Silver Crash of 1893, construction in Capitol Hill concentrated on apartments. Three buildings still in existence are examples of the architecture of this time: The Colonnade, Alta Court (currently an office building), and the Hamilton. This cultural and demographic shift, from single-family mansions toward boarding houses and rental property for the transient middle class, marked a shift toward the present multi-family dominance of the neighborhood.

Capitol Hill remained a solid middle-class neighborhood until after World War II, when middle-class families left Capitol Hill. The demographics of people left behind were transients and renters.

Another watershed in the history of Capitol hill was the completion of Interstate 70. No longer did incoming tourists drive down East Colfax Avenue on their way into downtown. The tourist dollar was effectively wiped out as a revenue source for East Colfax after this decade. So began another downward spiral. With no tourists to spend money along East Colfax the businesses suffered, as did the demand to go to Capitol Hill.

The affordability, urban character and eclectic architecture made the area appealing to young bohemians, artists, musicians (Jack Kerouac and Allen Ginsberg were former neighborhood residents) which has led to a gradual gentrification that reached its height during the 2000s. The rents in the neighborhood have increased significantly over the past decade, and many of the cheap apartments in the area have been converted into more expensive condominiums. Nonetheless, the neighborhood has an older housing stock which lacks off-street parking, contributing to a relative affordability compared to other central neighborhoods.

Currently many portions of East Colfax Avenue are undergoing redevelopment to make them denser and more pedestrian-friendly. Despite these redevelopment efforts, a brief stroll along Colfax Avenue through the Capitol Hill neighborhood will provide a glimpse of its history.

In 2012 the state history museum of Colorado, the History Colorado Center, was opened next to the new Colorado State Judiciary building.

== Geography ==
Capitol Hill highlighted on this map of Denver's neighborhoods.

The neighborhood is located just southeast of Denver's Central Business District (CBD) in a well-established residential neighborhood, with commercial centers located along major traffic routes (such as Colfax Avenue and Broadway) and interior arterials (such as East 13th and 14th Avenues). The neighborhood is directly east of the Civic Center neighborhood and the Colorado State Capitol. Over 95% of this neighborhood is developed. The average year of construction for buildings is 1920, with some of the oldest single-family homes in the city. The characteristics of Capitol Hill are closely related to other east Denver neighborhoods, which include the hospital district and the North Capitol Hill neighborhood. Public transportation and city support services are readily available. Neighborhood Boundaries:

- North – Colfax Avenue
- South – Seventh Avenue
- East – Downing Street
- West – Broadway

== Characteristics ==
Historical population
Year	Pop.	±%
2010	14,708	—
2020	16,675	+13.4%

Capitol Hill is Denver's most densely populated neighborhood. It was once the home of Denver's elite and origination of Foursquare architecture in Denver. Today it consists of historic mansions, apartments and condo buildings. Because of the concentration of multi-family uses and the urban character of the neighborhood, parking is at a premium. The area is strongly influenced by the Colorado State Capitol, which is within its boundaries, and Downtown Denver which is adjacent to the northwest boundary of the neighborhood. Commercial uses are typically located on major arterials such as Colfax Avenue, East 8th Avenue, East 14th Avenue, East 13th Avenue, Lincoln Street and Broadway. A considerable number of mansion properties have been converted to office uses over the past several years due to zoning exemptions offered to historic structures which are zoned for residential uses. Office development in the neighborhood is primarily concentrated in the northwest portion of the neighborhood with small professional offices located throughout the neighborhood.

== Arts and culture ==
The Capitol Hill neighborhood is influenced by its proximity to the Colorado State Capitol, Downtown and its northern boundary, East Colfax Avenue.

Capitol Hill is one of the most cosmopolitan neighborhoods in Denver, well known as a haven for artists and bohemians. There are numerous restaurants, clubs, bars, stores, concert venues, and other cultural amenities in the community. East 13th Avenue is the center of Denver's punk community with various stores that cater to punks and hipsters. Colfax Avenue has a reputation for a wild nightlife with multiple concert venues (The Fillmore Auditorium, The Ogden Theater, The Bluebird Theater, 1Up Colfax), and numerous late-night bars, coffeeshops, restaurants, and stores on the street. The Esquire Theatre at 590 Downing Street, originally the Hiawatha Theater (1927), operated as one of Denver's primary art-house cinemas from 1942 until its closure in July 2024, and was one of the few remaining standalone neighborhood theaters in Denver not located in an indoor mall. During the day, lobbyists and politicians from the Colorado State Capitol can be seen making deals in the restaurants and bars of the neighborhood. The neighborhood also has a reputation for being a very gay and lesbian friendly area of Denver.

Capitol Hill is next to two major Denver parks, Civic Center Park and Cheesman Park. Both of these are meeting centers for the community; they host many festivals, including the Capitol Hill United Neighborhoods-sponsored People's Fair in early June.

Capitol Hill has had a long bohemian reputation with the Colburn Hotel on Grant Street being a onetime residence of Jack Kerouac and Allen Ginsberg.

=== Attractions ===
- Colorado State Capitol
- Cathedral of St. John in the Wilderness
- Molly Brown House – now a museum
- Quizno's subs – the first location of the chain
- Wax Trax! Records – record store opened in 1978 which spawned Wax Trax! Records in Chicago. Located at 13th and Washington
- History Colorado Center
- The Episcopal Church
- Colorado Governor's Mansion

== Crime ==
The crime rate in 2014 in the Capitol Hill neighborhood was 8.63 incidents per 1,000 residents, above average for Denver.

== Gallery ==
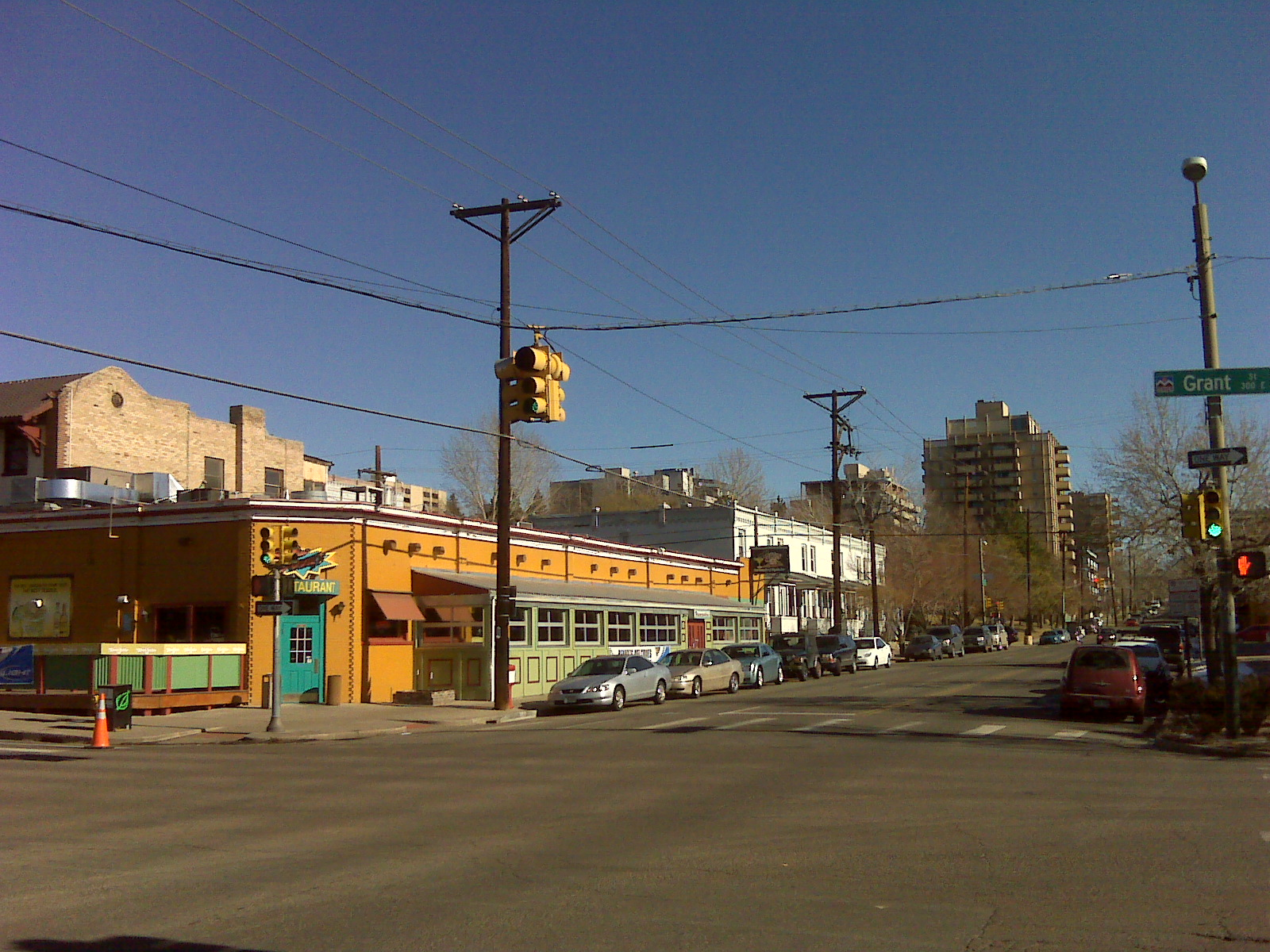
Grant and 7th, near Gov's Park in Capitol Hill

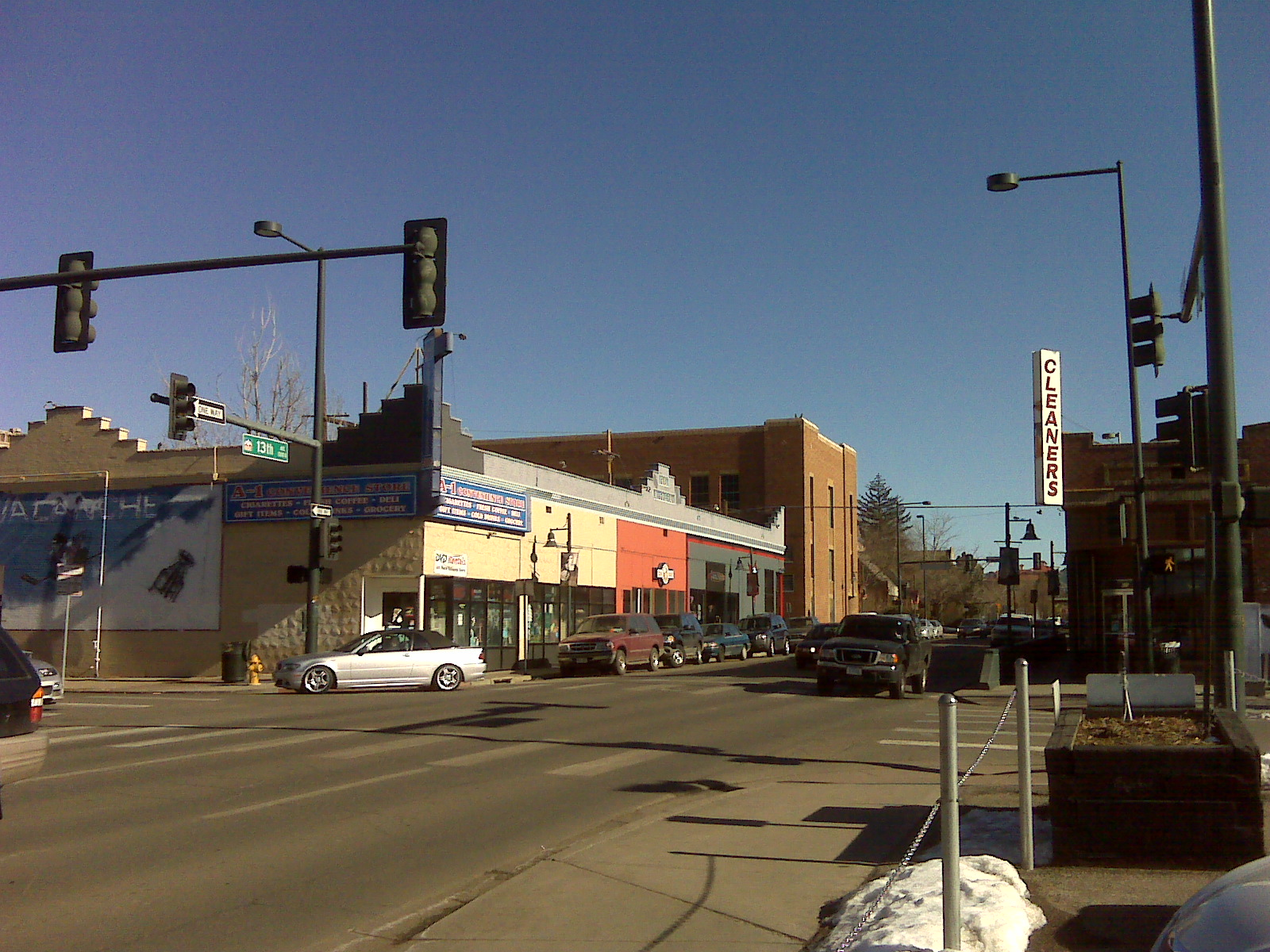
13th and Pearl, in the heart of Capitol Hill

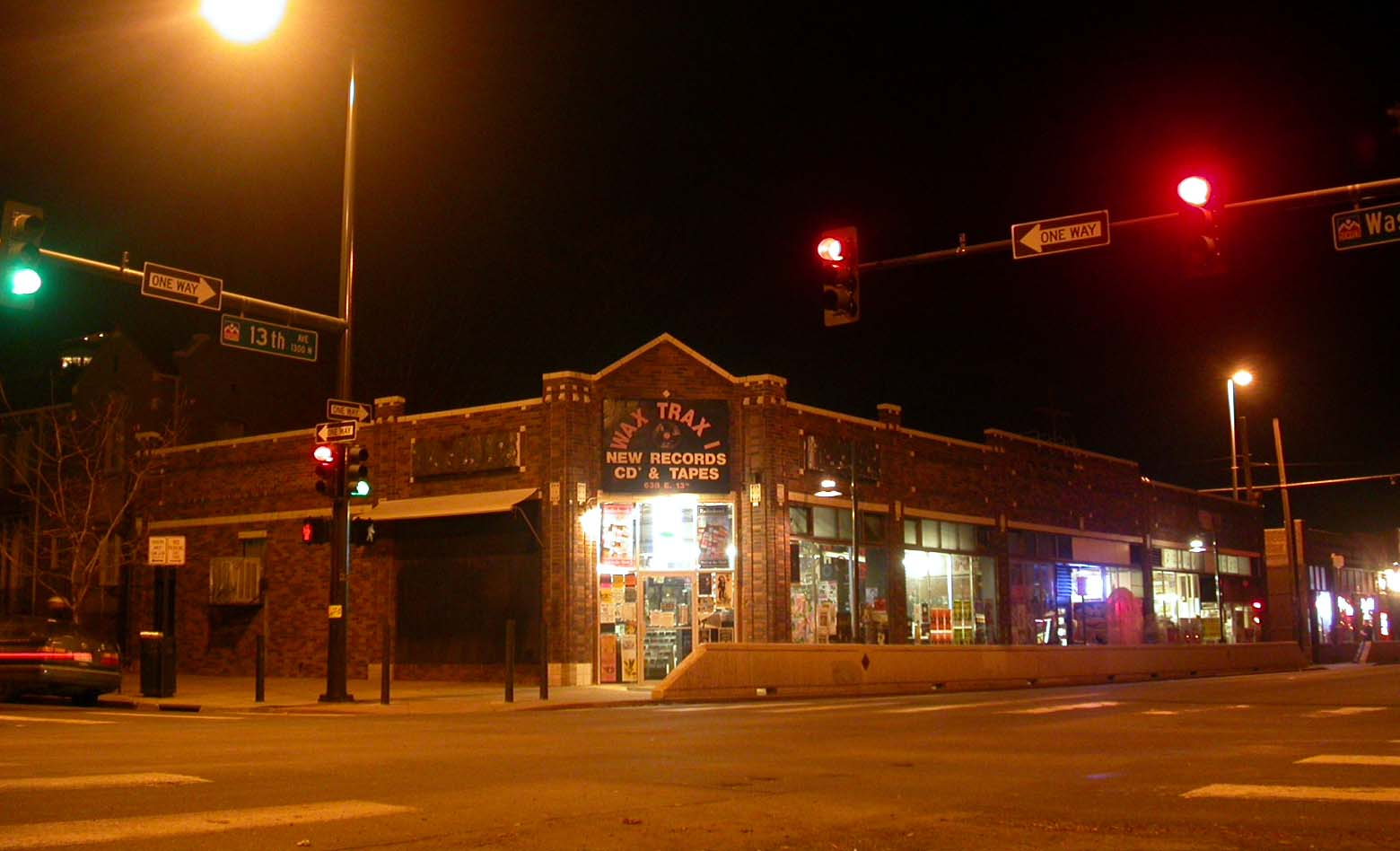
Wax Trax, 13th and Washington

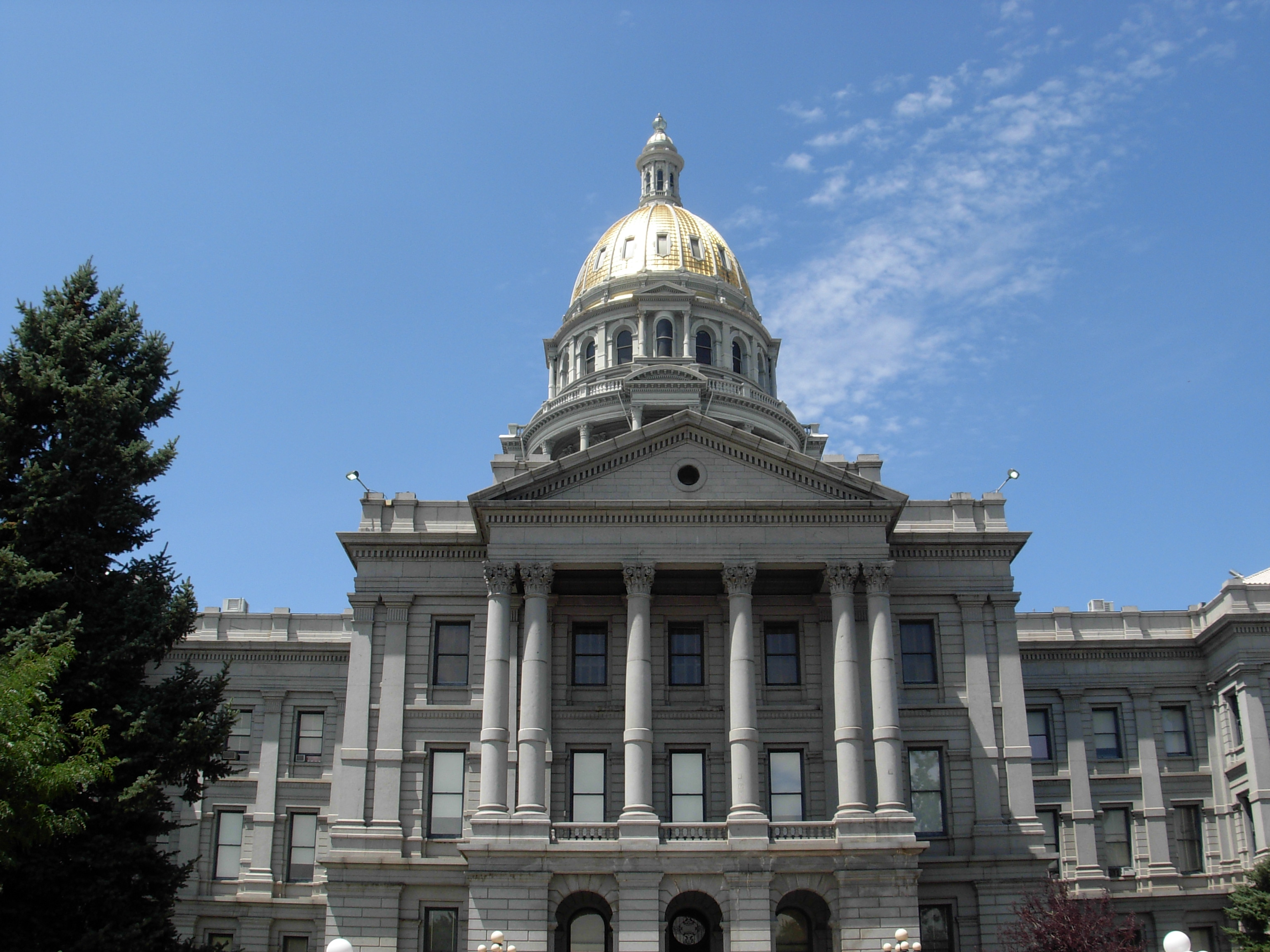
The east side of the Colorado State Capitol in Capitol Hill

== See also ==
- Bibliography of Colorado
- Geography of Colorado
- History of Colorado
- Index of Colorado-related articles
- List of Colorado-related lists
  - List of neighborhoods in Denver
  - List of populated places in Colorado
- Outline of Colorado
