= North Capitol Hill, Denver =

Neighborhood in Denver, Colorado, US

Coordinates: 39.7433°N 104.9823°W

North Capitol Hill
- Neighborhood
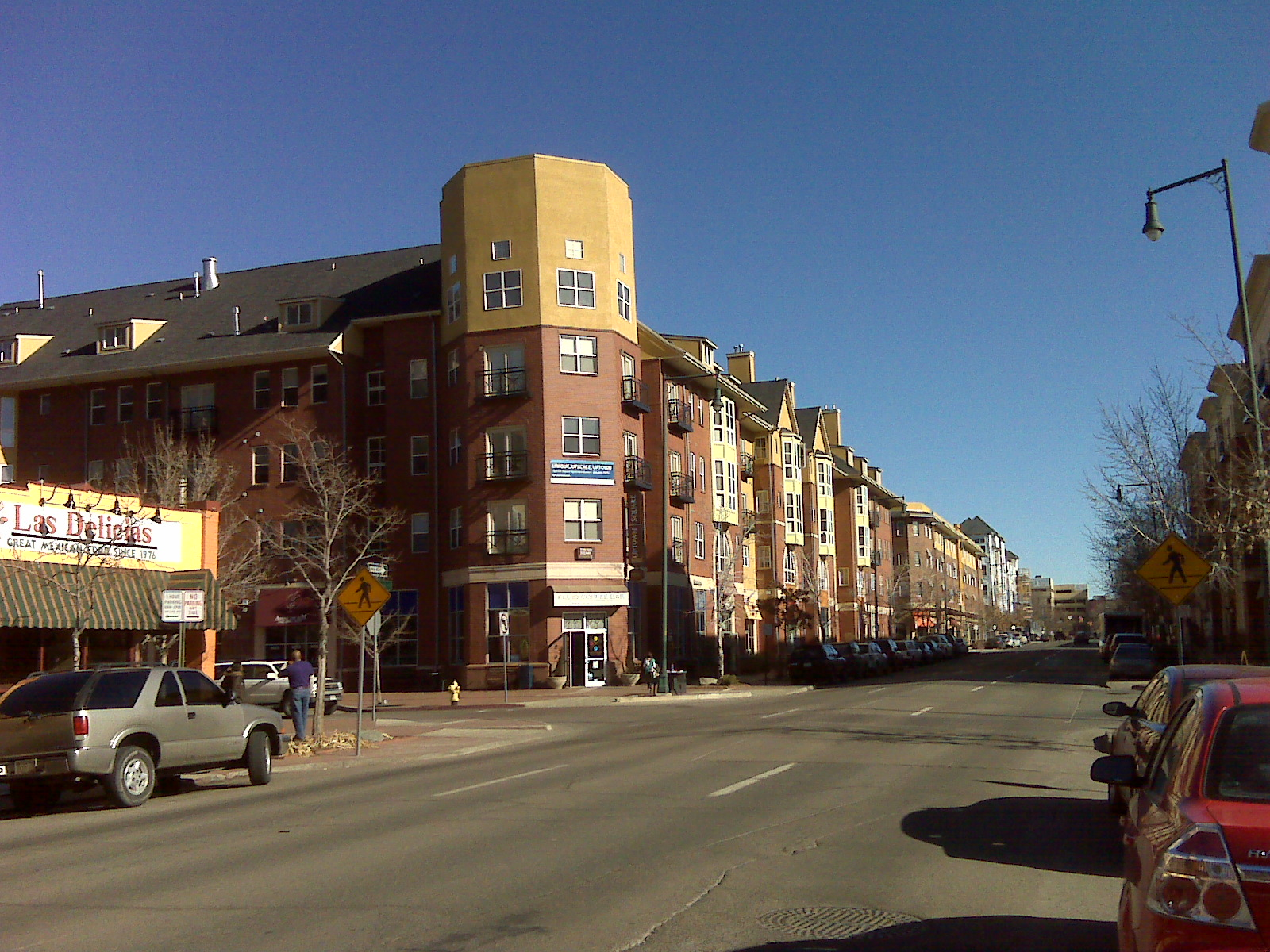
- 19th Avenue in Uptown, Denver
- Interactive map of North Capitol Hill
- Country: United States of America
- State: Colorado
- City: Denver

Population (2010)
  - Total: 5,823
- ZIP Codes: 80203, 80218

North Capitol Hill, often referred to as Uptown, is a center city neighborhood near the Colorado State Capitol. The neighborhood has a diverse population, and is similar to surrounding neighborhoods of Five Points and Capitol Hill, in that it cannot be defined by a single demographic. Currently, downtown is undergoing significant redevelopment and gentrification, with many young residents and transplants populating the apartments and homes that frequent the area. North Capitol Hill had a violent crime rate of 13.74 incidents per 1,000 residents in 2014, one of the ten highest rates among Denver neighborhoods. The poverty rate is also much higher than city and national averages, with 34.74% of the population living in poverty. North Capitol Hill is bordered by 20th Ave on the north, Park Ave on the northeast, Downing St on the east, Colfax Ave on the south, and Broadway on the west.

== See also ==
- Bibliography of Colorado
- Geography of Colorado
- History of Colorado
- Index of Colorado-related articles
- List of Colorado-related lists
  - List of neighborhoods in Denver
  - List of populated places in Colorado
- Outline of Colorado
