= Hall House =

Hall House or Hall Farm may refer to:

in the United States

(sorted by state, then city/town)

- Goode-Hall House, Town Creek, Alabama, listed on the National Register of Historic Places (NRHP) in Alabama
- Arthur C. and Helen Neel Hall House, Tucson, Arizona, listed on the NRHP in Pima County, Arizona
- Lewis D.W. Hall House, Tucson, Arizona, listed on the NRHP in Pima County, Arizona
- Fred Hall House, Kensett, Arkansas, NRHP-listed
- Hall House (Little Rock, Arkansas), NRHP-listed
- Charlie Hall House, Twin Groves, Arkansas, NRHP-listed
- Hall House (Denver, Colorado), one of the oldest buildings in Colorado
- Col. David Hall House, Lewes, Delaware, NRHP-listed
- David Hall House, Lake Villa vicinity, Illinois, NRHP-listed
- Hall Farm (Clunette, Indiana), NRHP-listed
- Hall-Crull Octagonal House, Rushville, Indiana, NRHP-listed
- Hannah Morse Fowler Hall House, Buchanan, Iowa, NRHP-listed
- James Norman Hall House, Colfax, Iowa, NRHP-listed
- Israel Hall House, Davenport, Iowa, NRHP-listed
- Hall House (Bowling Green, Kentucky), listed on the NRHP in Warren County, Kentucky
- Gov. Luther Hall House, Monroe, Louisiana, listed on the NRHP in Ouachita Parish, Louisiana
- Hall House (Bethel, Maine), NRHP-listed
- Enoch Hall House, Buckfield, Maine, NRHP-listed
- Chapman-Hall House, Damariscotta, Maine, NRHP-listed
- McWain-Hall House, Waterford, Maine, NRHP-listed
- Edward Hall House, Arlington, Massachusetts, NRHP-listed
- Isaac Hall House, Medford, Massachusetts, NRHP-listed
- Stephen Hall House, Reading, Massachusetts, NRHP-listed
- S. A. Hall House, Uxbridge, Massachusetts, NRHP-listed
- Henry C. Hall House, Waltham, Massachusetts, NRHP-listed
- Charles A. Hall Three-Decker, Worcester, Massachusetts, NRHP-listed
- Dr. Leonard Hall House, Hudson, Michigan, NRHP-listed
- Joseph E. Hall House (Tecumseh, Michigan), NRHP-listed
- S. Edward Hall House, St. Paul, Minnesota, NRHP-listed
- Hall-Henderson House, Sardis, Mississippi, listed on the NRHP in Panola County, Mississippi
- Hall-Roberson House, Sardis, Mississippi, listed on the NRHP in Panola County, Mississippi
- William P. Hall House, Lancaster, Missouri, NRHP-listed
- Charles S. Hall House, Epsom, New Hampshire, NRHP-listed
- Mauldin-Hall House, Artesia, New Mexico, NRHP-listed
- Frank A. Hall House, Westfield, New York, NRHP-listed
- Hall Family House, Bear Poplar, North Carolina, NRHP-listed
- Hall Cabin, Fontana, North Carolina, NRHP-listed
- Hall-London House, Pittsboro, North Carolina, NRHP-listed
- Rev. Plummer T. Hall House, Raleigh, North Carolina, NRHP-listed
- Josephus Hall House, Salisbury, North Carolina, NRHP-listed
- Lucius Coleman Hall House, Webster, North Carolina, NRHP-listed
- Ralph Hall Farm District, Carrington, North Dakota, NRHP-listed
- Howard A. Hall House, Eugene, Oregon, NRHP-listed
- Hall–Chaney House, Milwaukie, Oregon, NRHP-listed
- Hazel Hall House, Portland, Oregon, NRHP-listed
- Joseph E. Hall House (Brookville, Pennsylvania), NRHP-listed
- Ainsley Hall House, Columbia, South Carolina, NRHP-listed
- Alexander Doak Hall Farm, Kingsport, Tennessee, listed on the NRHP in Sullivan County, Tennessee
- Boyd-Hall House, Abilene, Texas, listed on the NRHP in Taylor County, Texas
- Hall-Sayers-Perkins House, Bastrop, Texas, listed on the NRHP in Bastrop County, Texas
- Wallace-Hall House, Mansfield, Texas, listed on the NRHP in Tarrant County, Texas
- R. A. Hall House, San Angelo, Texas, listed on the NRHP in Tom Green County, Texas
- Robert Hall House, Seguin, Texas, NRHP-listed
- Poulson-Hall House, Manti, Utah, listed on the NRHP in Sanpete County, Utah
- Nels G. Hall House, Salt Lake City, Utah, listed on the NRHP in Salt Lake City, Utah
- William A. Hall House, Rockingham, Vermont, NRHP-listed
- Gen. Robinson Hall House, Wallingford, Vermont, NRHP-listed
- Thomas Hall House, Childress, Virginia, NRHP-listed
- Lewis Hall Mansion, Wellsburg, West Virginia, NRHP-listed
- Samuel Hall House, Albion, Wisconsin, NRHP-listed
- Chauncey Hall House, Racine, Wisconsin, NRHP-listed

== See also ==
- Joseph E. Hall House (disambiguation)
