= Toomey's Mills =

- Formerly listed on the U.S. National Register of Historic Places
- Location within Wyoming Location within the United States
- Location: 500 W. Main St., Newcastle, Wyoming
- Coordinates: 43°51′13″N 104°12′23″W
- NRHP reference No.: 08001062

Significant dates
- Added to NRHP: November 13, 2008
- Removed from NRHP: December 11, 2013

Toomey's Mills in Newcastle, Wyoming, began in 1905 as the Newcastle Milling Company and Electric Light Plant. Later the Newcastle Rolling Mills, Toomey's Mills processed locally produced wheat until 1965. The mill is a prominent local landmark, with "TOOMEY'S MILLS" painted on the side of the elevator. It is today used as a restaurant, an example of adaptive reuse. Much of the original mill machinery has been retained, and the property retains a significant degree of integrity.

The original frame portion of the mill was built by George C. Getchell, who was reported to have contracted with Duling and Smith to build a 100-barrel flour mill. A quarry was opened in a canyon north of town to provide stone for the foundation. The mill opened on September 5, 1905, and was granted an electric light franchise by the town the day before. The generating equipment was installed by the Western Electric Company of Omaha, and produced enough surplus power to operate street lights in town.

D.J. Toomey of Spearfish, South Dakota, bought the mill in 1919. It was at the time the largest flour mill in Wyoming, producing "White Satin" flour for markets with 200 miles (320 km). By 1936, the mill had expanded considerably, with warehouse space and offices. Two silos were constructed of 2x6 lumber laid flat, along with a concrete silo.

Toomey's Mill was placed on the National Register of Historic Places in 2008.

As of March 2012, Toomey's Mill was torn down and was replaced by a convenience store. The site was removed from the NRHP in 2013. The bricks were then used to reconstruct the mill at the entrance to Devils Tower.

== See also ==
- Kopper's Hotel and Saloon
- Outlaw Saloon
- Nora's Fish Creek Inn
- Taco John's
