= Adolph Zang Mansion =

Historic house in Colorado, United States

- U.S. National Register of Historic Places
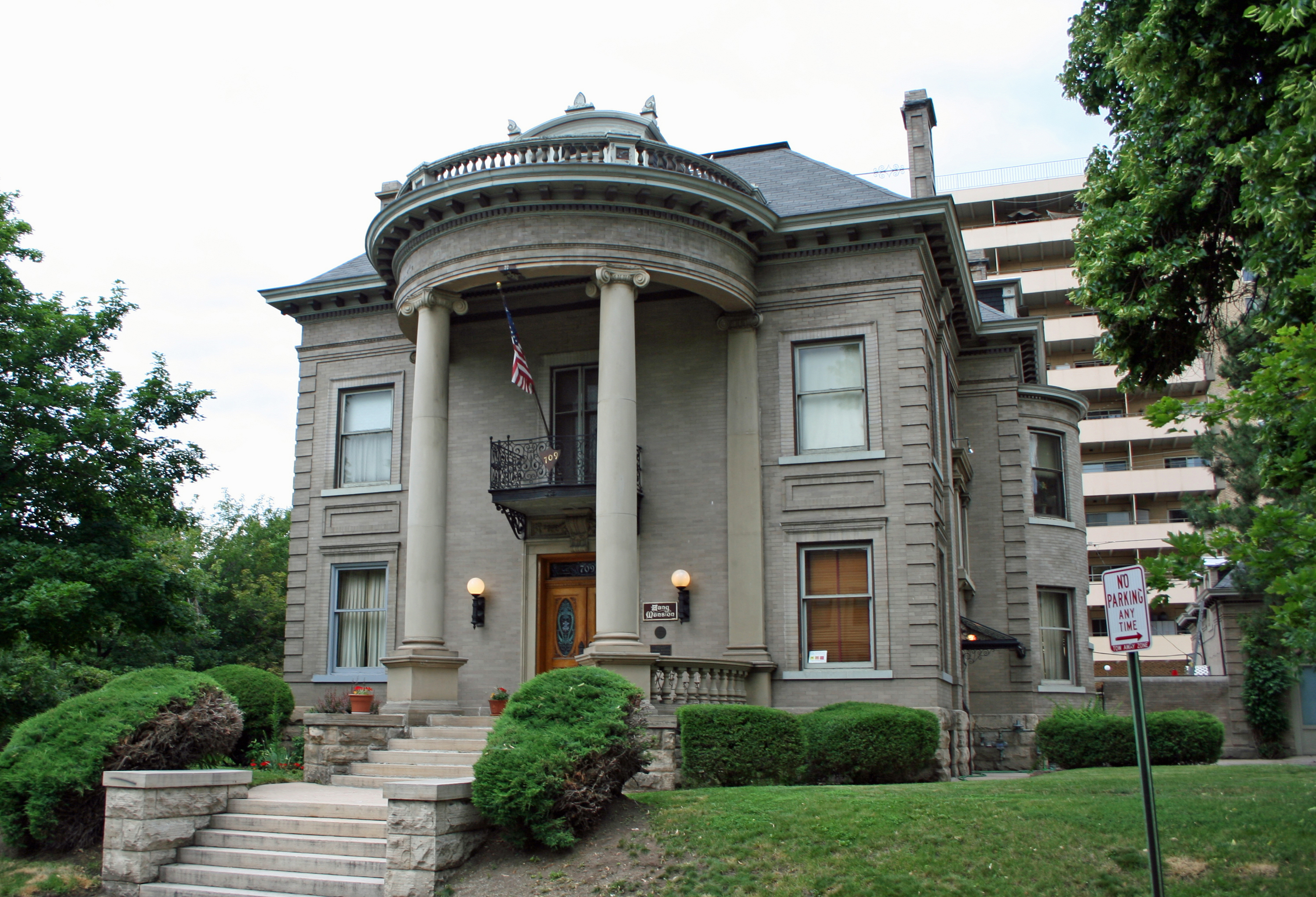

- Location within Colorado Location within the United States
- Location: 709 Clarkson St., Denver, Colorado
- Coordinates: 39°43′39″N 104°58′39″W
- Area: less than one acre
- Built: 1880
- Architectural style: Classical Revival
- NRHP reference No.: 77000371
- Added to NRHP: November 23, 1977

Adolph Zang Mansion is a historic house located at 709 Clarkson Street in Denver, Colorado.

== Description and history ==
Built in 1903, it was designed by Denver architect Frederick C. Eberley. Architecturally, the three and a half story house is Neoclassical Revival. It was built for Adolph J. Zang, son of Philip Zang the founder of Zang Brewery. The interior includes gilded ceilings, five fireplaces, Tiffany chandeliers, handcarved woodwork and a stained-glass window scene from Shakespeare’s Merchant of Venice.

It was listed on the National Register of Historic Places on November 23, 1977.

In 2017, the mansion was sold for 2 million dollars.

== See also ==
- Adolph J. Zang House, also NRHP-listed in Denver
