= William Lang (architect) =

American architect (1846–1897)

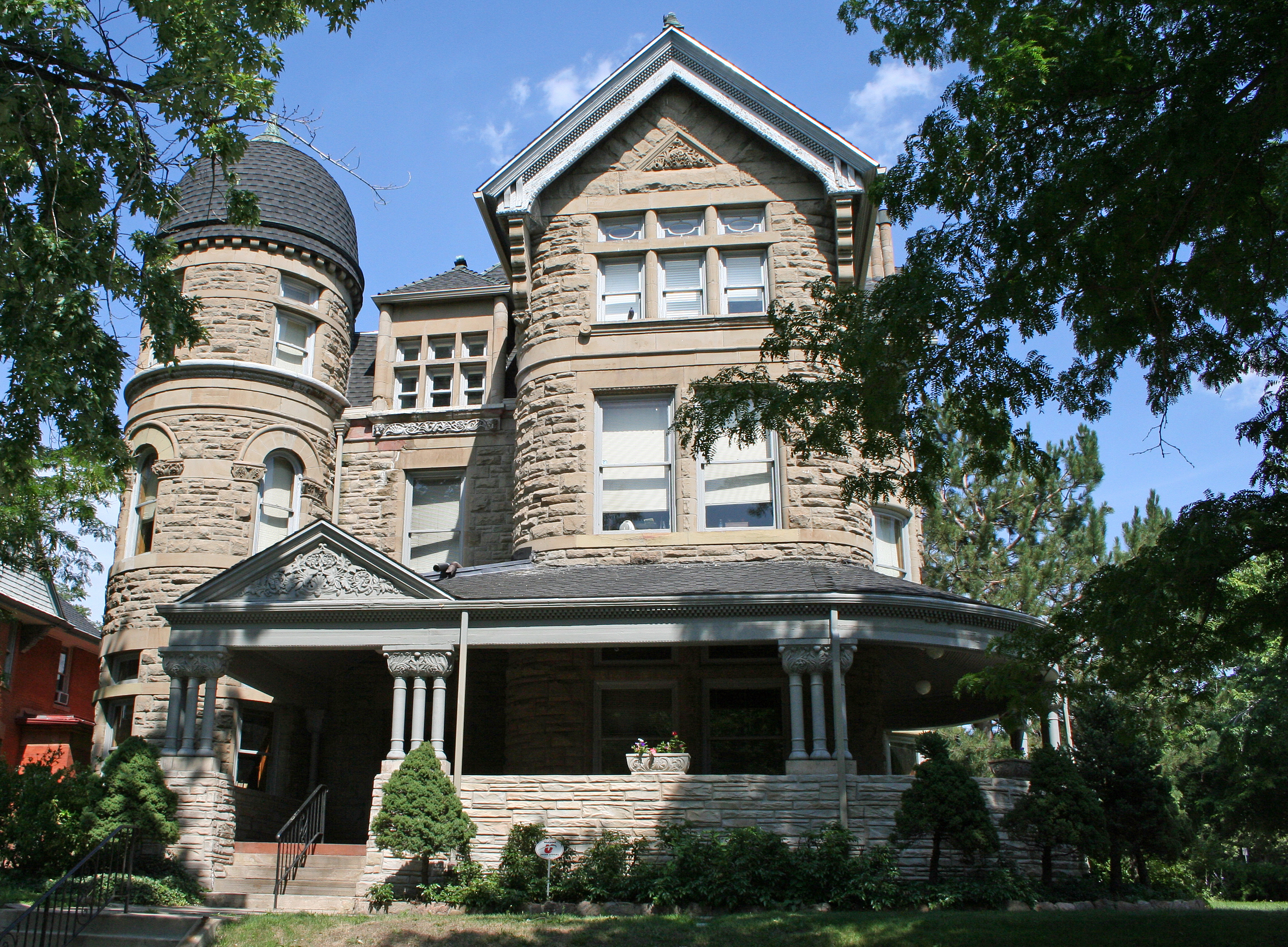
Bailey House (Denver, Colorado)

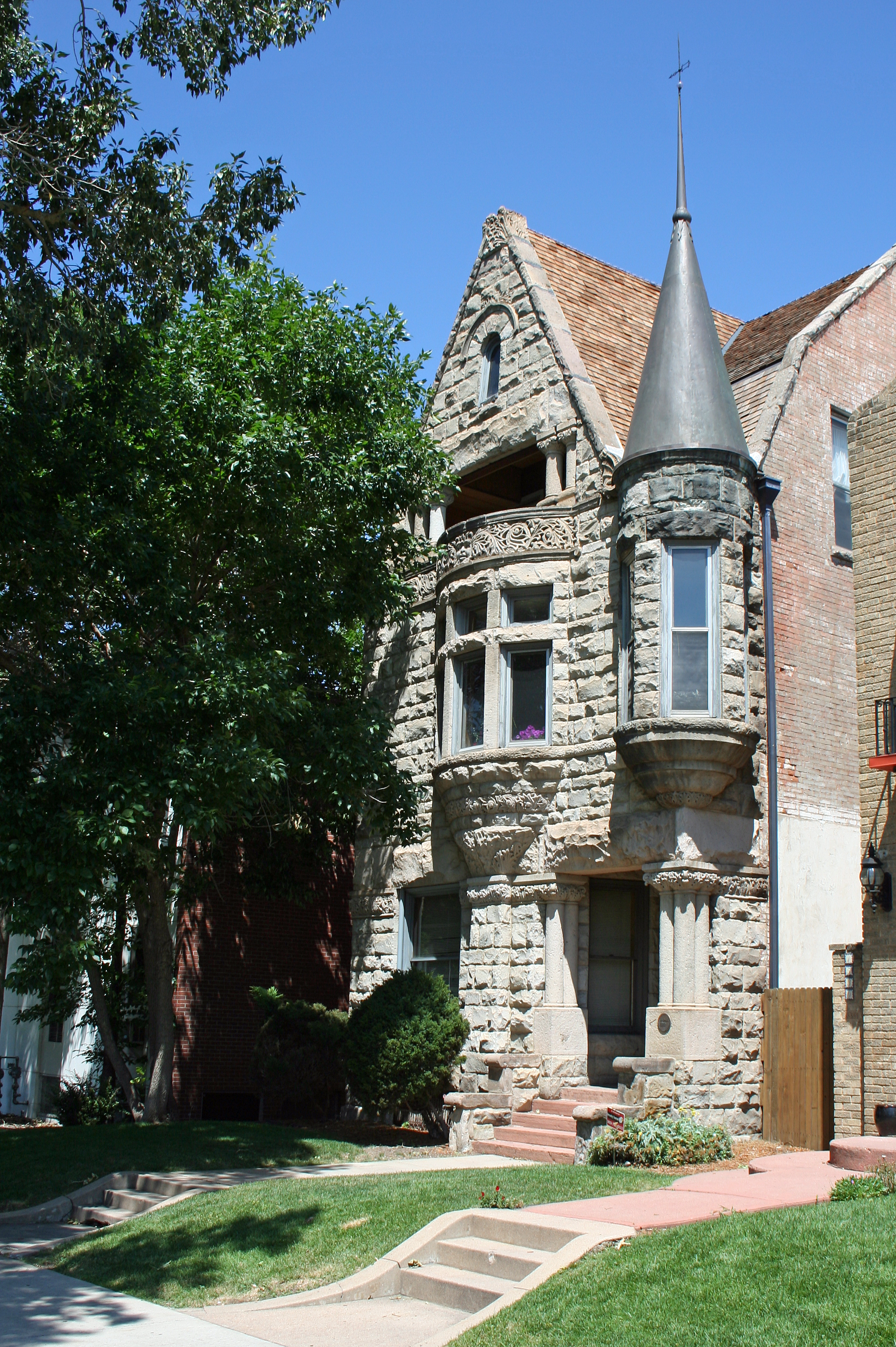
Adolph J. Zang House

William A. Lang (1846–1897) was an architect active in Denver, Colorado from 1885 to 1893. On his own or in partnership, he designed a number of buildings that survive and are listed on the U.S. National Register of Historic Places. Lang partnered with Marshall Pugh to form Lang & Pugh in 1889. The firm also employed Reinhard Schuetze for a time.

Lang's business interests, like his father's, often faced financial stumbles and may have collapsed following the Panic of 1893. He moved to Illinois and in 1897. His medical records describe him as suffering from severe depression and as manic depressive.

Lang was born in Ohio in 1846. Early in his career, he designed at least three buildings in Kansas including Albion School in Albion, Nebraska. He moved to Denver in 1886. Lang is known for his use of turrets, gargoyles, polychromatic stone, and a mixture of columns. He ran into financial and related legal troubles. His business collapsed and he seems to have lost his mental faculties. He was hit and killed by a train.

Lang's presentation book is at the Western History Collection of the Denver Public Library. He married Delia and had one daughter, Mabel.

== Works ==
- Castle Marne (1890), 1572 Race Street, Denver, Colorado
- St. Mark's Parish Church, 1160 Lincoln St., Denver, (NRHP-listed, credit to Lang & Pugh)
- Ghost Building, 800 18th Street, Denver, (Ghost Block at Seventeenth and Champa?)
- Bailey House, 1600 Ogden St., Denver, built 1899, (NRHP-listed, credit to Lang, William). This is the largest of William Lang's surviving residential residences.
- Caroline Bancroft House, 1079-81 Downing St. and 1180 E. 11th, Denver, (NRHP-listed, credit to Lang, William A.)
- Bliss House (1892 Lang & Pugh), 1389 Stuart St., Denver, NRHP-listed as "Building at 1389 Stuart Street"
- Eizabeth McNulty House (1892 Lang & Pugh) 1390 Stuart St., Denver, NRHP-listed as Building at 1390 Stuart Street)
- Frank I. Smith House (1890 Lang & Pugh), 1435 Stuart St., Denver, NRHP-listed as Building at 1435 Stuart Street)
- Jane Spangler House (1890-1892 Lang & Pugh) 1444 Stuart St., Denver, NRHP-listed as Building at 1444 Stuart Street)
- Ernest LeNeve Foster House, 2105 Lafayette St., Denver, CO (NRHP-listed, credit to Lang, William)
- William Lang Townhouse, 1626 Washington St., Denver, CO (NRHP-listed, credit to Lang, William)
- Orman–Adams House, 102 W. Orman Ave., Pueblo, CO (NRHP-listed, credit to Lang, William A.)
- Wilbur S. Raymond House, 1572 Race St., Denver, CO (NRHP-listed, credit to Lang, William)
- Schlessinger House, 1544 Race St. Denver CO (NRHP-listed, credit to Lang, William)
- Vine Street Houses, 1415, 1429, 1435, 1441, 1453 Vine St., Denver, CO (NRHP-listed, credit to Lang, William)
- Adolph J. Zang House, 1532 Emerson St., Denver, CO (NRHP-listed, credit to Lang, William)
- WA Raymond Residence (1892)
- Molly Brown House (1889), 1340 Pennsylvania Street in Denver. Now the Molly Brown House Museum
- Gunther Store and Opera House, Albion
- Gates House, Third and Walnut in Albion, Nebraska in (1883). Lang built the home for his family and later sold it to a school board member.
- Dow–Rosenzweig House (1882), at 1129 E. 17th Ave. in Denver, NRHP-listed
- Tedford House (1889) 1415 Vine St., Denver NRHP-listed
- Fred Hall House (1889) 1429 Vine St., Denver NRHP-listed
- Ralph Voorhees House at 1471 Stuart St., Denver, NRHP-listed as Building at 1471 Stuart Street
- One or more works in South Side–Baker Historic District, roughly bounded by W. Fifth Ave., Broadway, W. Alameda Ave., and W. Fox St., Denver, CO (NRHP-listed, credit to Lang, William)
- One or more works in Swallow Hill Historic District, roughly Bounded by Clarkson St., E. Seventeenth Ave., Downing St., E Colfax Ave., Denver, CO (NRHP-listed, credit to Lang, William A.)

Perhaps not related:

- Scott Covered Bridge, Off PA 21 crossing Ten Mile Creek, Gray Township, Rogersville, PA (NRHP-listed, credit to Lang, William)
