= Joseph E. Hall House =

Joseph E. Hall House may refer to:

- Joseph E. Hall House (Tecumseh, Michigan), listed on the National Register of Historic Places (NRHP)
- Joseph E. Hall House (Brookville, Pennsylvania), NRHP-listed

== See also ==
- Hall House (disambiguation)
