= Adolph J. Zang House =

Historic house in Colorado, United States

- U.S. National Register of Historic Places
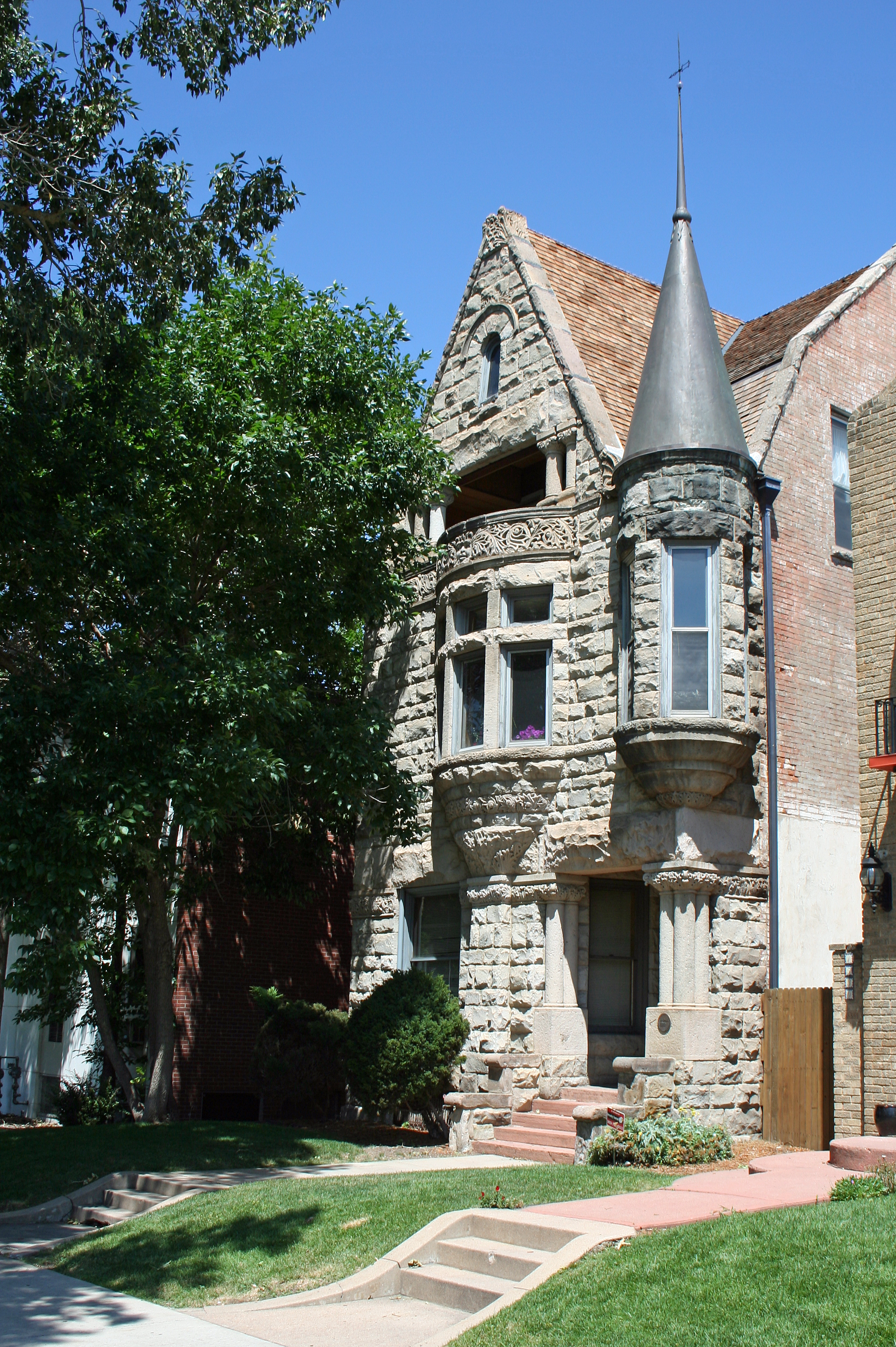

- Location within Colorado Location within the United States
- Location: 1532 Emerson St., Denver, Colorado
- Coordinates: 39°44′27″N 104°58′31″W
- Area: less than one acre
- Architect: Lang, William
- Architectural style: Gothic, Romanesque
- NRHP reference No.: 79000596
- Added to NRHP: November 14, 1979

The Adolph J. Zang House, also referred to as the Gargoyle House, is a National Register of Historic Places-listed residence in Denver, Colorado. It is located at 1532 Emerson Street. William Lang was the architect. It was constructed in a Gothic architecture/ Romanesque architecture style. It has also been described as Late Victorian eclecticism with elements of Chateauesque, Gothic, and Richardsonian Romanesque architecture. It remains largely intact.

Adolph Zang (14 August 1856 - 28 September 1916) was the son of Philip Zang (15 February 1826 - 18 February 1899), the founder of Zang Brewery. Adolph Zang worked in the brewery business and had mining and real estate interests.

== See also ==
- Adolph Zang Mansion, also NRHP-listed in Denver
