= Outlaw Saloon =

Venue in Wyoming

- Interactive map of Outlaw Saloon
- Location: 312 S Greeley Hwy. Cheyenne, Wyoming, US
- Coordinates: 41.114495°N 104.8028621°W
- Capacity: 1000

The Outlaw Saloon was a bar located in Cheyenne, Wyoming.

== History ==
The Outlaw Saloon is the largest bar in the U.S. state of Wyoming with an approximate 26,000 square foot. It is renowned for hosting various country music concerts notably during the Cheyenne Frontier Days. In more recent years, the venue began hosting combat sports events such as mixed martial arts, boxing, and kickboxing.

On November 7, 2020, the Outlaw Saloon hosted the historical match between Burmese-Canadian world champion Dave Leduc defending his Lethwei world title against American Cyrus Washington in Cheyenne, Wyoming. Wyoming being the first state to legalize the art of Lethwei, the Outlaw Saloon was the chosen venue to host the first-ever Lethwei fight as well as the first Lethwei world title fight held in the United States in the millennia-old history of the sport originating from Myanmar. The event was sanctioned by the World Lethwei Federation in partnership with the Wyoming Combat Sports Commission.

== Controversy ==
In 2003, the Outlaw Saloon, previously named Cowboy South Bar, was the last known location of Shawny Lee Smith, the victim of an unsolved homicide case.

Over the years, the Wyoming Police Department has conducted many arrests on the premises of the Outlaw Saloon.

== Notable performers ==
The following is a partial list of who either got their start or had performances at The Outlaw Saloon.

- Uncle Cracker
- Bret Michaels
- Chancey Williams
- David Allan Coe
- Lady A
- Colter Wall
- Casey Donahew
- Kolby Cooper
- Ian Munsick
- Adam Doleac
- Ned LeDoux
- Sunny Sweeney
- William Michael Morgan
- Rodney Atkins
- Tracy Byrd
- Bucky Covington
- John Berry

== Recognition ==
In 2015, the venue was named Top 10 Wild West Bars in the United States by The Sydney Morning Herald.

== See also ==
- Cheyenne Frontier Days
- Kopper's Hotel and Saloon
- Toomey's Mills
- The Saloon
- Nora's Fish Creek Inn
- Taco John's
- List of dive bars
