= Frederick C. Eberley =

American architect

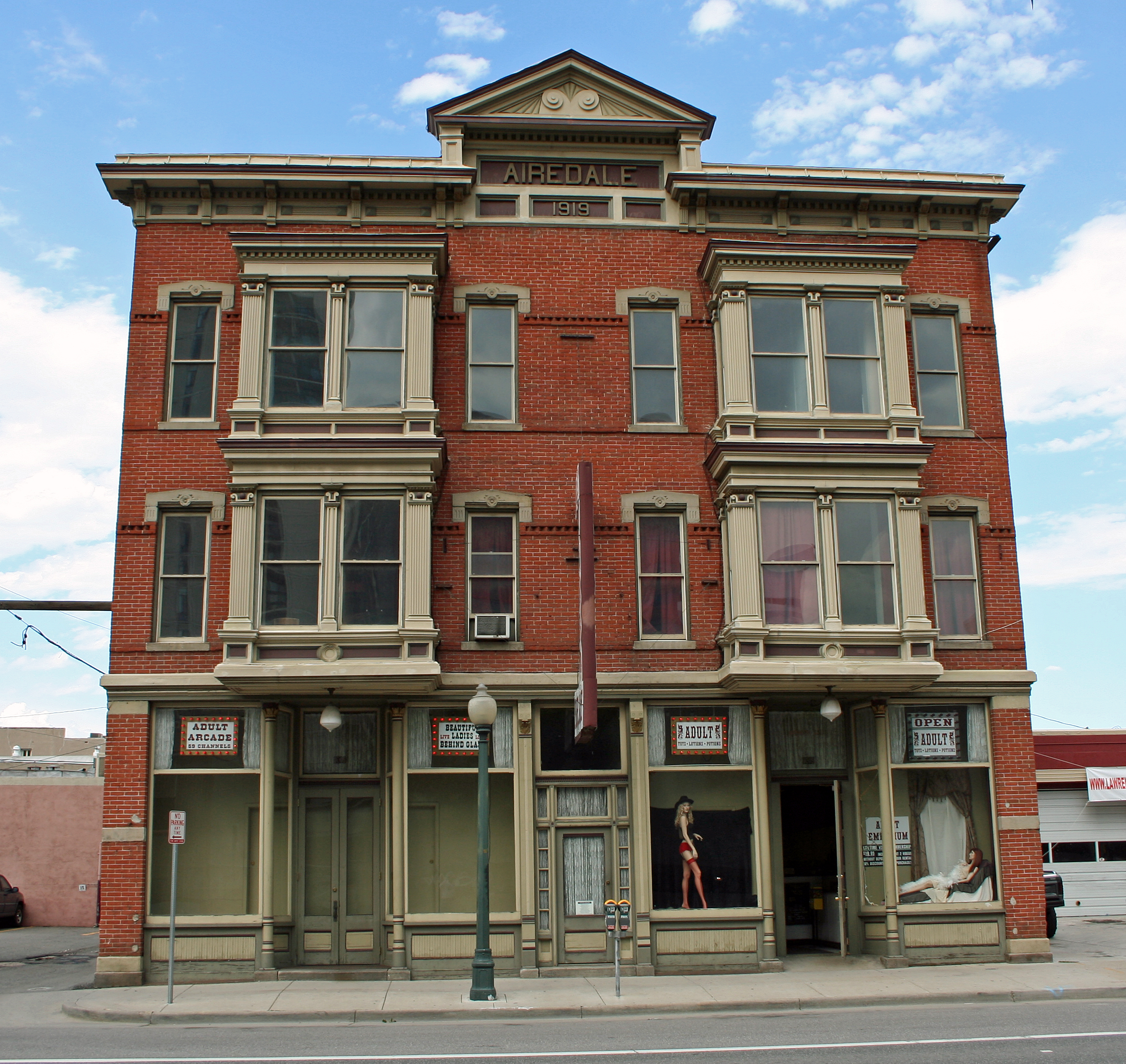
Kopper's Hotel and Saloon

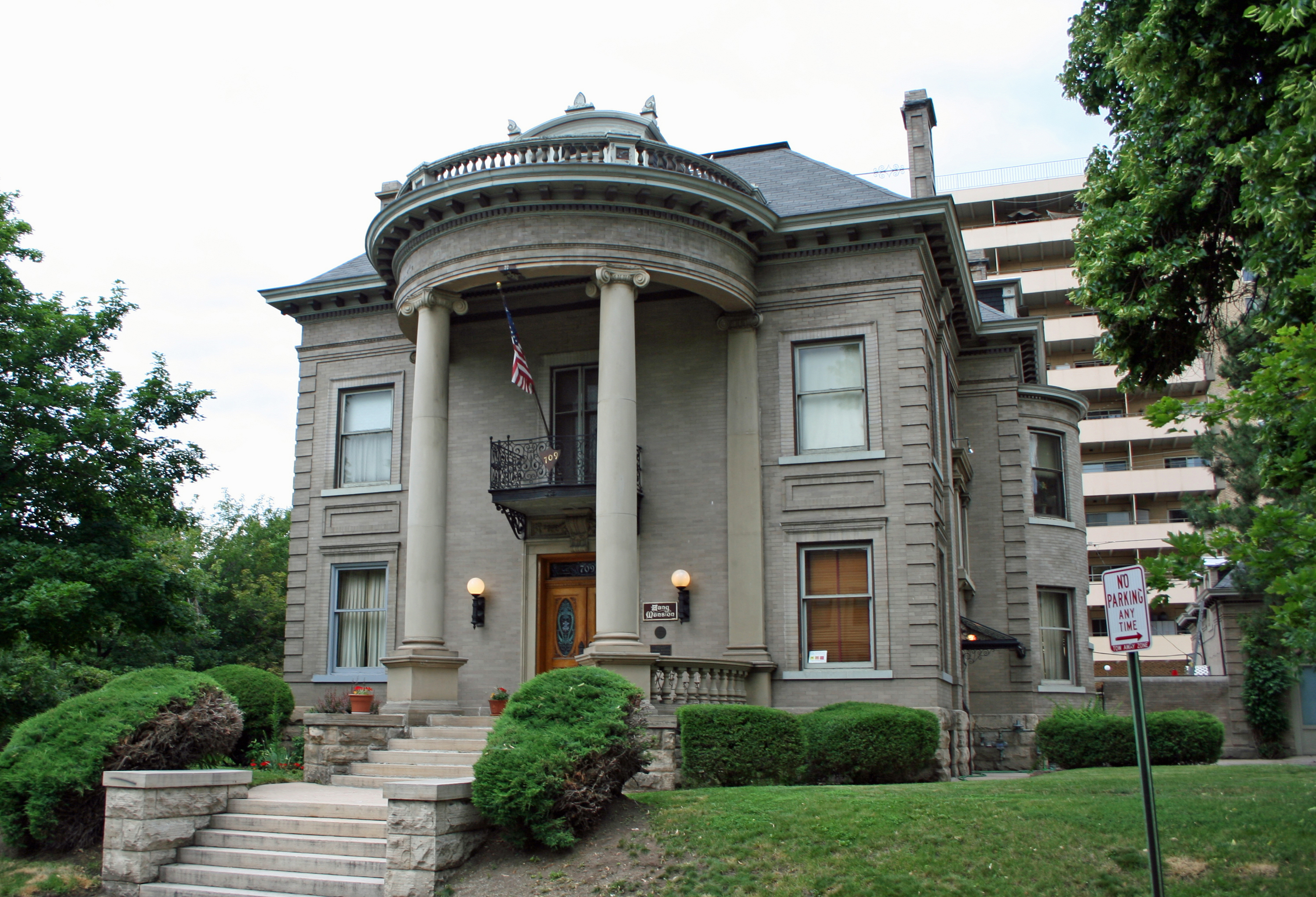
Adolph Zang Mansion

Frederick Carl Eberley was a prominent architect in Denver, Colorado. His work included the Barth Hotel (1882). He is also credited with Kopper's Hotel and Saloon, also known as the Airedale Building, added to the National Register of Historic Places in 1999. Eberley lived in the Schulz-Neef House, built in 1881 at 1739 E. 29th Avenue, for a time after German immigrant R. Ernst Schulz, a bookkeeper at the German National Bank and real estate investor for whom it was built. Eberley later lived at 29th Avenue and Gilpin Street. Eberley was a German immigrant and his commission for the Kopper's Hotel and Saloon came from a fellow German immigrant. His other work includes Colorado State Armory, Blatz Brewery, Colorado Bakery & Saloon, and Groussman Grocery.

== Projects ==
- Airedale Building / Kopper's Hotel and Saloon at 1215–1219 20th St. in Denver NRHP #98001378 Queen Anne style
- Zang Mansion (1903)
- Arapahoe County Courthouse (1883) at 16th St. and Court PI. (Demolished 1933)
- Barth Hotel / Union Warehouse (Union Liquor Warehouse) 1514 17th Street and Blake Street in Denver. Added to the National Register of Historic Places in 1982 (#82002297)
- Tivoli-Union Brewery / Tivoli Student Union Center at 1342 10th St.
- Gertrude Apartments (originally the Fritz Theis home) at 2545 Champa Street in Denver's Five Points neighborhood, part of the Curtis Park-Champa Street Historic District
