= Hannah Morse Fowler Hall House =

Historic house in Iowa, United States

- U.S. National Register of Historic Places
- Location within Iowa Location within the United States
- Location: 1285 Garfield Ave.
- Nearest city: Buchanan, Iowa
- Coordinates: 41°45′32.82″N 91°15′13.43″W
- Area: less than one acre
- Built: 1854
- NRHP reference No.: 98000378
- Added to NRHP: May 1, 1998

Hannah Morse Fowler Hall House is a historic residence located near the unincorporated community of Buchanan, Iowa, United States. It was listed on the National Register of Historic Places in 1998.

== History ==
Hannah Morse Fowler Hall was a wealthy woman from Wallingford, Connecticut whose first husband was an attorney. With Abram Hall, her second husband, she moved to the Iowa Territory in 1845 and acquired this property in Cass Township, Cedar County, Iowa in 1848. She used her own money to buy the property and the title was in her name, not her husband's. The original house on the property was completed later that year. It remained on the property until sometime between 1968 and 1970. Edward Rate, who owned the property after the Halls, operated a glove manufacturing plant on the property.

== Architecture ==
The present post-and-beam frame dwelling was completed in 1854. Its design was influenced by the Greek Revival style that was popular at the time. The house is two rectangular blocks that are joined. The northernmost block is slightly taller than the southern block. They were built on a limestone foundation. On the first floor the living room and the library, which was also used as a bedroom, are in the north block of the house. The dining room, kitchen and pantry, which was later converted into a bathroom, are in the south block. The second floor has two bedrooms and a bathroom in the north block. A bedroom, which was also used as a weaving room, and a room for the hired man are in the south block. There is a staircase in each block, and there is no connecting hallway between the bedrooms in the north block with those in the south block.
