= The Church Nightclub =

Historic church in Colorado, United States

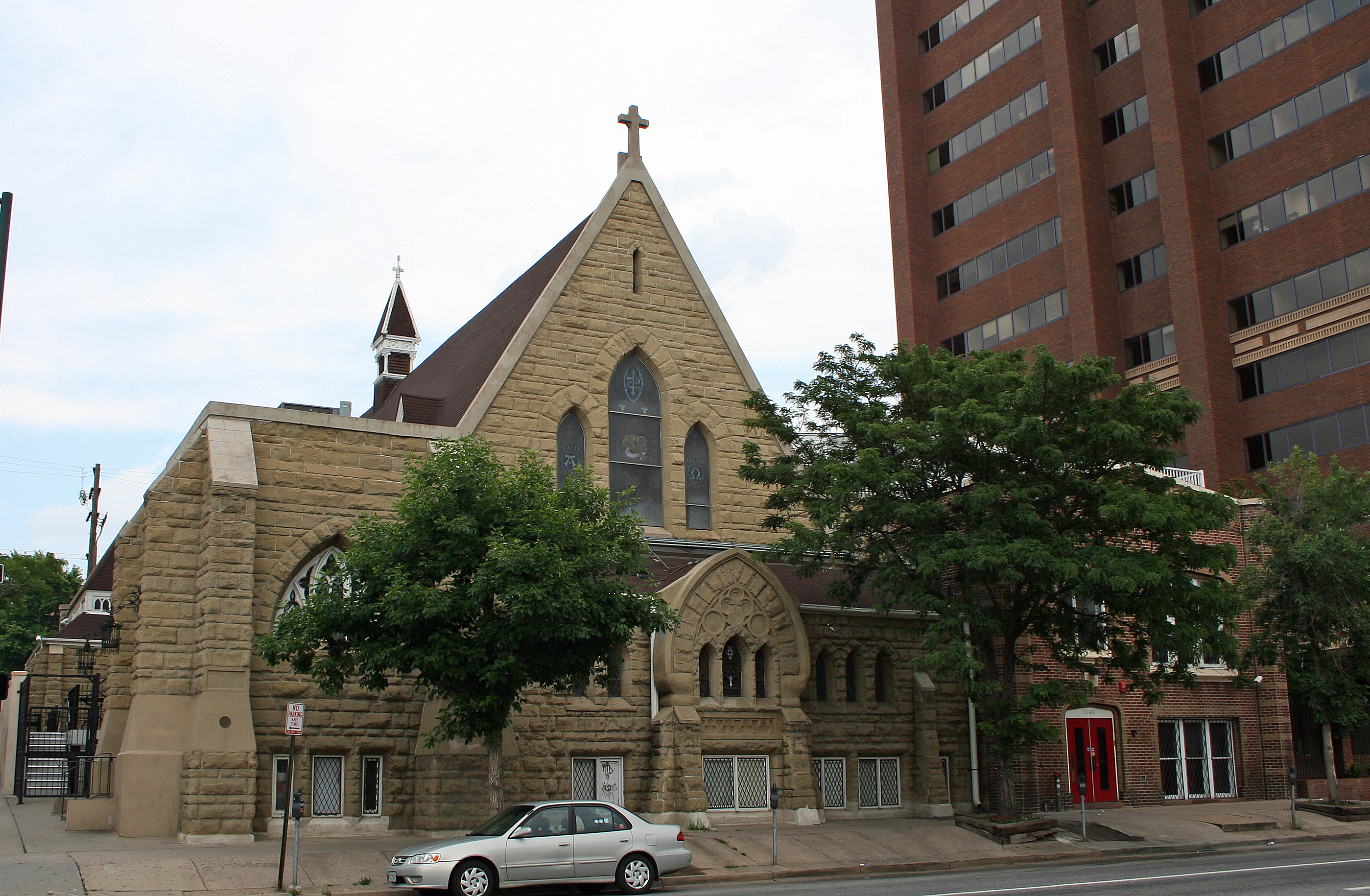
- Interactive map of The Church Nightclub
- Address: 1160 Lincoln St; Denver, CO; US
- Coordinates: 39°44′6″N 104°59′5″W
- Capacity: Seated: 350; Standing: 1,554

Construction
- Built: 1889; 137 years ago
- Opened: 1996; 30 years ago

Website
coclubs.com/church
- St. Mark's Parish Church
- U.S. National Register of Historic Places
- Colorado State Register of Historic Properties
- Area: 0.4 acres (0.16 ha)
- Architect: Lang & Pugh
- Architectural style: High Victorian Gothic
- NRHP reference No.: 75000514
- CSRHP No.: 5DV.170
- Added to NRHP: September 18, 1975

The Church Nightclub, formally known as St. Mark’s Parish Church, is a historic Episcopal church located at 1160 Lincoln Street in Denver, Colorado. Built in 1889, the church was designed by Lang & Pugh, one of Denver’s most influential architectural firms of the late 19th century. Recognized for its architectural significance, St. Mark’s was added to the National Register of Historic Places in 1975. Since 1996, the building has functioned as a nightclub, primarily hosting electronic dance music (EDM) concerts, DJ performances, and other nightlife events.

== History ==
=== Original use ===
St. Mark’s Parish Church was founded as part of the Mission of the Holy Comforter in 1875 under the direction of Sisters Eliza Barton and Hanna Austin. The mission was later elevated to parish status in 1887, and in 1889, Reverend Arundel acquired land at 12th and Lincoln for a new church building. The total cost of the construction, land, and furnishings exceeded $100,000 (equivalent to $3,580,000 in 2025). The church’s original Hooks and Hastings organ, installed for $7,800 (equivalent to $270,000 in 2025), was used until 1959, when it was replaced by a Reuter Organ Company instrument at a cost of $10,000 (equivalent to $110,400 in 2025).

By the late 19th century, St. Mark’s had become one of Denver’s most significant religious institutions, recognized for its architectural grandeur and active role in community service, music, and education.

In 1987, the congregation was moved to a new location in the Washington Park neighborhood following a split in the congregation. In 1994, the building was purchased from the Colorado Episcopal Diocese for $275,000 (equivalent to $597,400 in 2025) by Regas Christou.

=== Renovations ===
In the late 20th century, the former church was transformed into a nightclub as part of a broader trend of adaptive reuse of historic buildings in Denver. While the nightclub has been adapted for modern use, it retains elements of the original church architecture, including its vaulted ceilings, stained-glass windows, and intricate woodwork. The renovations added a dance floor, multiple bars, and a balcony area overlooking the main floor. The venue is equipped with a Funktion-One sound system and LED lighting.

== Architecture ==
St. Mark’s Parish Church exemplifies High Victorian Gothic architecture, a style characterized by pointed arches, intricate woodwork, and a pronounced vertical emphasis. The building was designed by William Lang, who designed a number of prominent buildings in Denver, and his business partner Marshall Pugh. The exterior of the church is constructed from buff sandstone sourced from Longmont, and dark red sandstone columns sourced from the Kemmuir quarry in El Paso County, Colorado. The interior is finished with rough-hewn native stone, paneled oak, and a black ash open-timbered ceiling.

The structural design of the church is particularly noteworthy. The wood trusses of the roof transfer forces downward through hammer-beam projections into columnar piers that support five pointed arches on each side of the nave. These roof elements, enhanced with intricate Gothic ornamentation in carved wood, are considered some of the most authentic examples of their kind in Colorado, next to the great drawing room of Glen Eyrie in Colorado Springs. The five-arched clerestory gable at the west end of the church allows for an influx of natural light, complementing the large west-facing triptych stained glass window.

The east wall of the sanctuary features an unusual set of seven tall slit windows, symbolizing seven altar candles. These windows are designed to create a visual effect resembling flickering candlelight, with stained glass elements providing dramatic contrast. The reredos, titled "Ascension and the Attendant Angels" and completed in 1923 by R. Byron Olson, received recognition from the Denver Art Association. The sanctuary and choir area, set in deep relief, are further accentuated by an elaborately painted triptych altarpiece that incorporates gold leaf detailing.

=== Structural changes ===
The church originally featured a castellated tower and turret, but in 1950, structural failure caused the upper portion of the bell tower to collapse, damaging the attached carillon. At a cost of $40,000 (equivalent to $535,300 in 2025), the turret was removed and replaced with a buttress for stability.
