= Nora's Fish Creek Inn =

Restaurant in Wilson, Wyoming

Coordinates: 43°29′52″N 110°52′28″W

Nora's Fish Creek Inn is a restaurant in Wilson, Wyoming, located in a historic building, which was once the local post office and general store. It was a Wild West-themed bar called Blackie’s Fish Creek Inn for most of the 1970s, until Nora Tygum bought the business and renamed it Nora's Fish Creek Inn in 1982.

In 2012, it was recognized by the James Beard Foundation as an American Classic. Due to fading health, in 2014 Nora Tygum turned operations over to her son Trace Tygum, and to her daughter Katheryn Tygum Taylor. Katheryn and Trace sold the business in 2022 to Tom Fay and Eddie Opler, who decided to keep the restaurant's name.

== See also ==
- Outlaw Saloon
- Kopper's Hotel and Saloon
- Taco John's
