= Bliss House (Denver) =

- Building at 1389 Stuart Street
- U.S. National Register of Historic Places
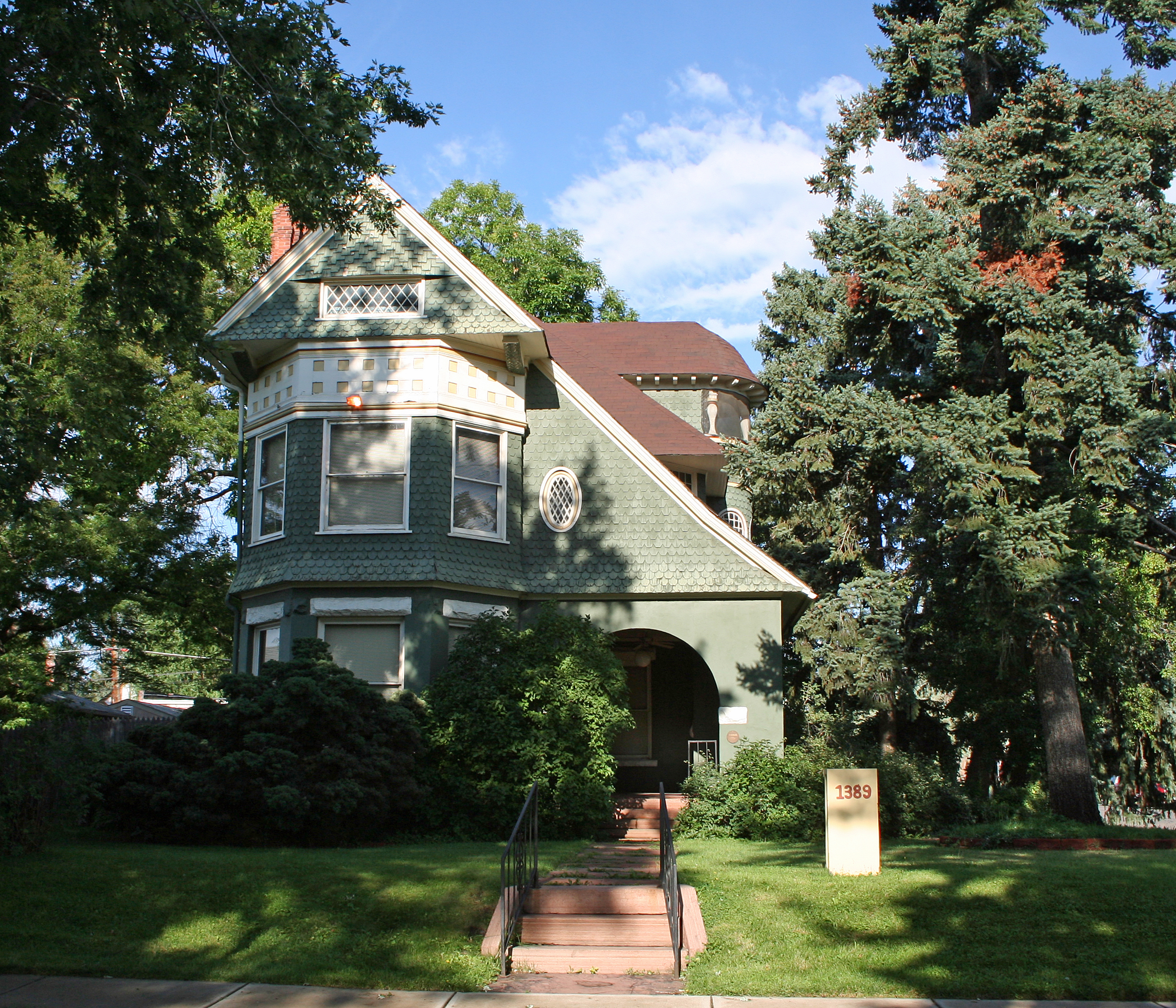

- Location within Colorado
- Location: 1389 Stuart St., Denver, Colorado
- Coordinates: 39.73830°N 105.04316°W
- Area: less than one acre
- Built: 1890
- Architect: Lang & Pugh
- Architectural style: Queen Anne
- MPS: West Colfax TR
- NRHP reference No.: 82002287
- Added to NRHP: July 19, 1982

The Bliss House in the West Colfax neighborhood of Denver, Colorado, is a Queen Anne-style house built in 1890. It was listed on the National Register of Historic Places in 1982 as Building at 1389 Stuart Street.

It is a two-and-a-half-story house designed by architects Lang & Pugh with exterior mostly covered by fishscale shingles. It has been described as "basically Queen Anne in style but with great originality of detail.... The design is complex with a combination of bays, unusual windows and a dramatic multi-planed roofline."

It was home of Dr. Gerald Bliss (Note: Spelling as "Geral Bliss" used in NRHP nomination document and History Colorado summary, but spelling as "Gerald Bliss" used in History of Colfax Avenue.) and his second wife "for all of their married life, both dying in 1945. Dr. Bliss was a Civil War veteran and had been a member of the honor guard over Lincoln's casket. He had gone to South Dakota where he practiced medicine for many years before retiring and moving to Colorado. He lived nearly fifty years after his retirement and was 99 years old when he died."

The house is a Denver Landmark. It is one of a cluster of six houses designed by Lang, five of which are surviving, that illustrate his architectural creativity.

== See also ==
- National Register of Historic Places listings in west Denver
