= Hazel Hall (poet) =

American poet

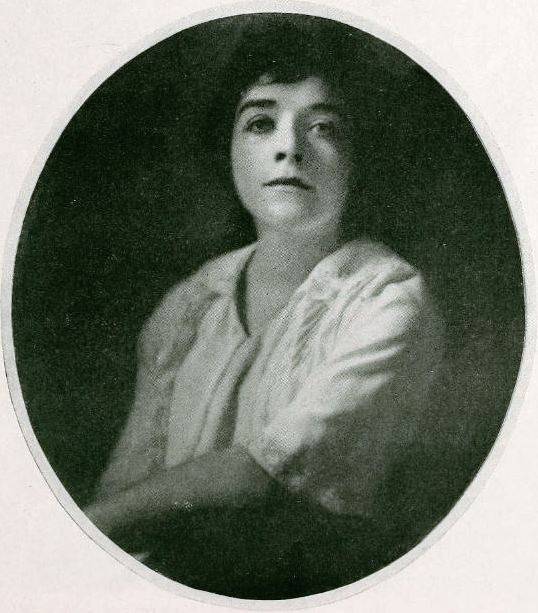
- From a 1922 magazine
- Born: February 7, 1886; Saint Paul, Minnesota
- Died: May 11, 1924 (aged 38); Portland, Oregon
- Education: Public school through fifth grade; home study thereafter
- Occupations: Poet, seamstress
- Known for: Poetry
- Parent(s): Montgomery and Mary Garland Hall
- Relatives: Ruth and Lulie (sisters)

Hazel Hall (February 7, 1886 – May 11, 1924) was an American poet based in Portland, Oregon.

== Life ==
Hall was born on February 7, 1886, in Saint Paul, Minnesota, to Montgomery and Mary Hall. As a young girl, she moved with her family, including sisters Ruth and Lulie, to Portland, where her father managed the express division of the Northern Pacific Railway. After surviving scarlet fever at the age of 12, or by some accounts after being injured in a fall, she used a wheelchair for the rest of her life.

Leaving public school in fifth grade because of her paralysis, Hall continued her education by reading widely at home. Favorite authors included Emily Dickinson, Robert Frost, and Edna St. Vincent Millay. She began writing at about age 9, and continued writing as a hobby through her teen years. Seeking paid work that could be done at home, she turned to professional sewing, expanding on another of her childhood interests. Stitching bridal robes, baby dresses, and gowns for wealthy families, she worked near a window from which she could watch passers-by on the street. Her writing themes often involved sewing and what she saw from her window.

In her 20s, she began writing poetry. In 1916, when she was 30, her first published poem appeared in the Boston Evening Transcript, and in 1917 her poetry appeared in The Masses, a New York publication with a national circulation. Eventually she had poems accepted by The Century Magazine, Harper's Magazine, The New Republic, The Nation, Sunset, and many others.

Reviewer Pearl Andelson of Poetry said this of Hall's first collection, Curtains, in 1922, "Comes Hazel Hall with her little book, every word and emotion of which is poignantly authentic."

She died on May 11, 1924, at home in Portland, "after an illness of some weeks".

== Legacy ==
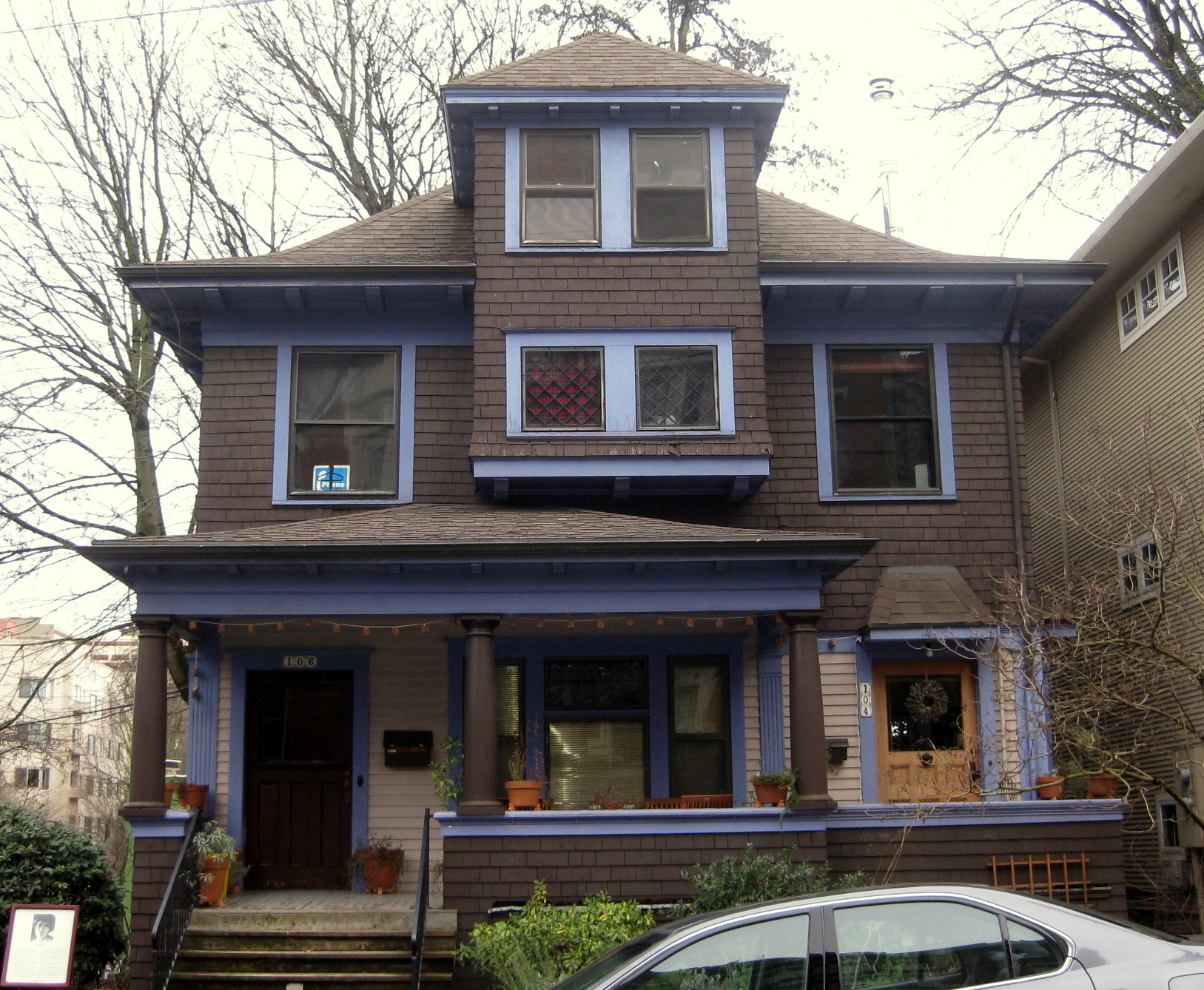
Hazel Hall House in Portland

Hall's home, located at 106 Northwest 22nd Place in Portland, is listed on the National Register of Historic Places as the Hazel Hall House. In 1995, the Oregon Cultural Heritage Commission erected a small park next to the house.

The Oregon Book Award for poetry is jointly named for Hall and fellow Oregon poet William Stafford. The organization that sponsors the awards, Literary Arts, refers to Hall as the "Emily Dickinson of Oregon".

== Awards ==
- 1920, first prize for poems published by Contemporary Verse
- 1921, Young Poets' Prize, Poetry magazine

== Works ==
=== Books ===
- Hall, Hazel (1921). Curtains. John Lane company.
- Hall, Hazel (September 2009). Curtains. BiblioBazaar, LLC. ISBN 978-1-113-67504-0.
- Walkers. Dodd, Mead and company. 1923.
- Cry of Time. E.P. Dutton & Co. 1928.
- The Selected Poems of Hazel Hall. Ahsahta. 1980. ISBN 978-0-916272-14-2.
- John Witte, ed. (2000). The Collected Poems of Hazel Hall. Oregon State University Press. ISBN 978-0-87071-478-8.

=== Anthologies ===
- William Stanley Braithwaite (ed.). "Three Girls". Anthology of Magazine Verse for 1920.
- Robert Hass, ed. (2000). American Poetry: Henry Adams to Dorothy Parker. Library of America.

== Works cited ==
- Shirley, Gayle C. (1998). More Than Petticoats: Remarkable Oregon Women. Helena, Montana: Falcon Publishing. ISBN 1-56044-668-4.
