= Bailey House (Denver, Colorado) =

Historic house in Colorado, United States

- U.S. National Register of Historic Places
- Colorado State Register of Historic Properties
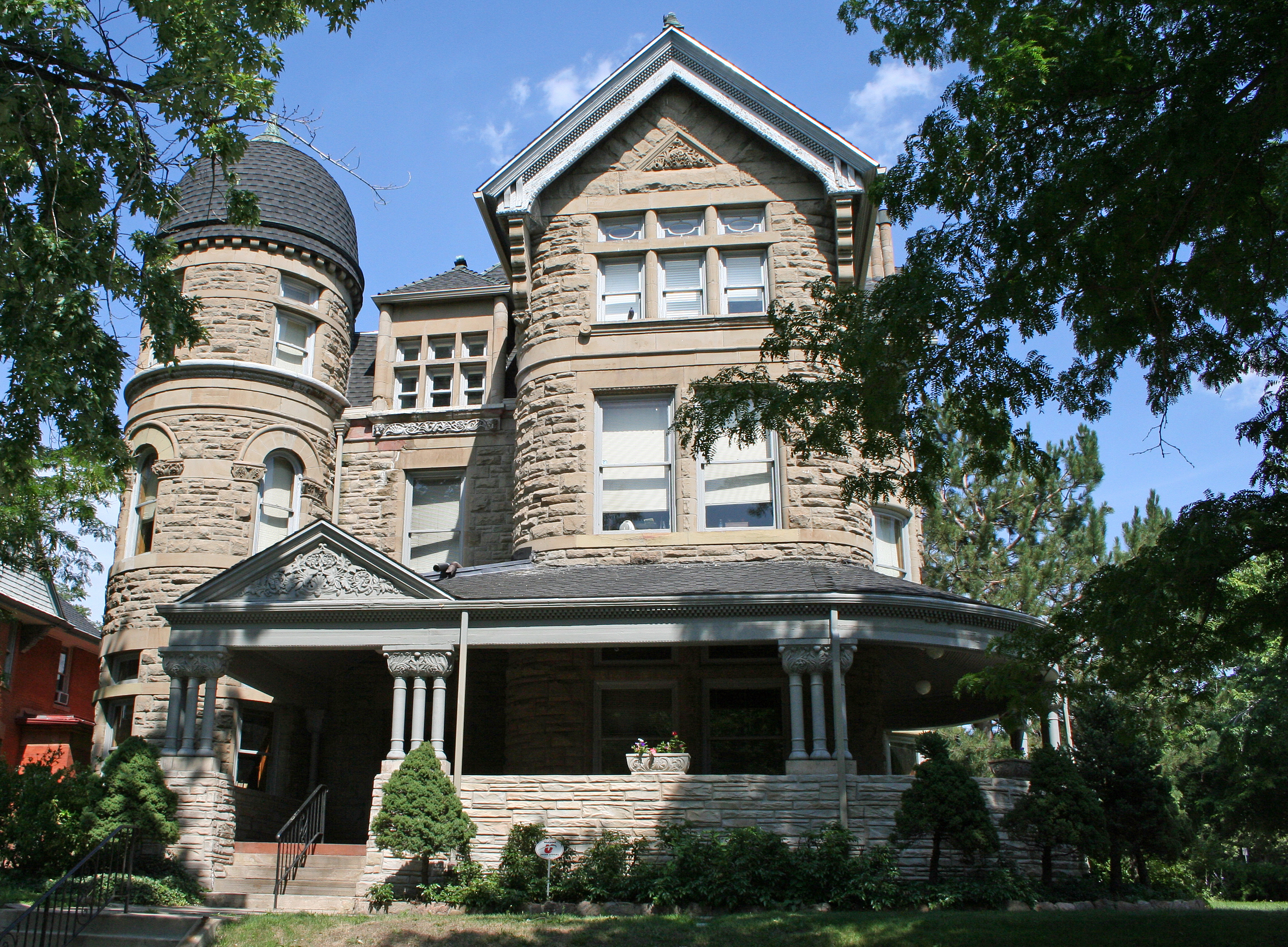
- Bailey House

- Location within Colorado Location within the United States
- Location: 1600 Ogden St., Denver, Colorado
- Coordinates: 39°44′31″N 104°58′26″W
- Area: less than one acre
- Built: 1889
- Architect: Lang, William
- Architectural style: Queen Anne, Romanesque, Richardsonian Romanesque
- NRHP reference No.: 78000840
- CSRHP No.: 5DV.145
- Added to NRHP: September 18, 1978

The Bailey House was built in 1889, and was designed by William A. Lang. The Bailey House, built for a Mr. G.W. Bailey, is the largest of William Lang's surviving residential residences. William A. Lang (1846–1897) was a Denver architect who was active from 1885 to 1893.

The Bailey House is Queen Anne style with a corner tower and a pinwheel plan. The house also has many Richardsonian Romanesque elements, especially in the materials and details.
