= Tivoli Brewery Company (building) =

- U.S. National Register of Historic Places
- Colorado State Register of Historic Properties
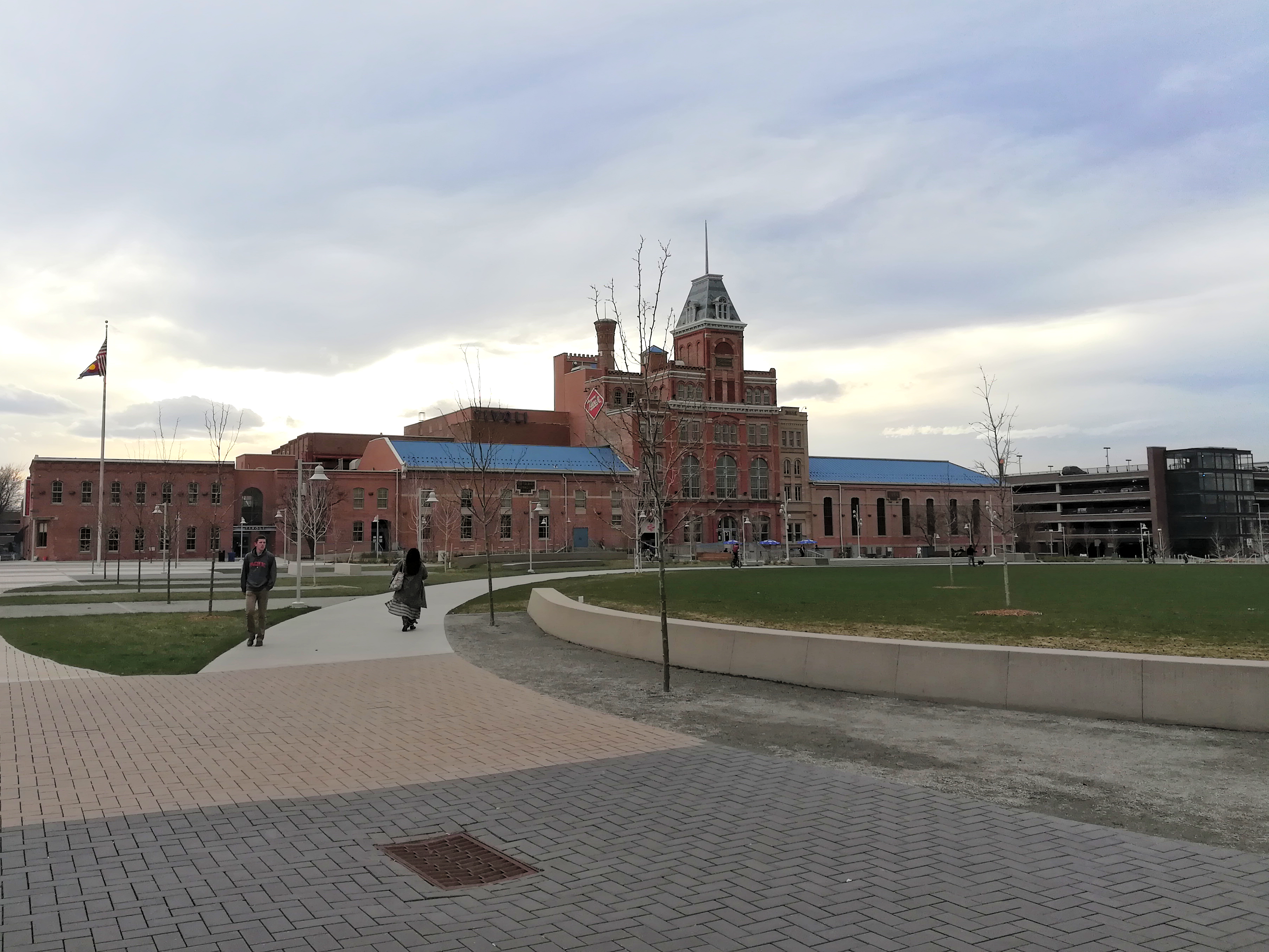
- Tivoli Brewery Company building on the Auraria Campus

- Location within Colorado Location within the United States
- Location: 1320--1348 10th St., Denver, Colorado
- Coordinates: 39°44′43″N 105°0′17″W
- Area: 2.6 acres (1.1 ha)
- Built: 1882
- Architectural style: Italianate; Teutonic Brewery
- NRHP reference No.: 73000469
- CSRHP No.: 5DV.119
- Added to NRHP: April 11, 1973

The Tivoli Brewery (now the Tivoli Student Union) is a historic building originally home to the Tivoli Brewing Company. It was designed by prominent Denver architect Frederick C. Eberley. The building is located in the Auraria Neighborhood of Denver, Colorado. Today the building is home to the Tivoli Student Union of the Auraria Campus, serving as a student center for the Metropolitan State University of Denver, Community College of Denver, and the University of Colorado Denver. In August 2015 the revived Tivoli Brewing Company began brewing in a new facility inside the building, in the original brewing area.

== History ==
The Tivoli Brewery building, located in the Auraria Neighborhood of Denver, Colorado, is considered a historic landmark. The building is the former home of the Tivoli Brewing Company, which was named after the Tivoli Gardens located in Copenhagen Denmark by past owner John Good. The Tivoli Brewery building was built in 1864 by German immigrant Moritz Sigi along with the Colorado territory's first artesian well. A well known local character and Denver councilman Sigi brewed the best "Buck Beer", a hybrid lager/ale similar to a Bock. Mr. Sigi had a sudden and tragic horse carriage accident that led to his death in 1874. The brewery was then sold to Max Melsheimer. Melsheimer renamed the brewery Milwaukee Brewery and attempted to expand the business production with the purchase of 250-barrel copper brewing kettles. The Milwaukee Brewery was not able to fulfill this mass production, and Melsheimer foreclosed on the loan he took out for the purchase. John Good, who was involved with both banking and brewing in early Denver history, took over the company and renamed it Tivoli Brewing Co.

At the time, the Tivoli Brewery and Zang's Brewery were the biggest breweries before prohibition. Zang's never recovered from the prohibition leaving Tivoli to become the iconic Denver Beer for the Western Aristocrat and eventually a dominant brewery in the west. Tivoli continued to grow and the public continued to embrace Tivoli beer. After Good died in 1918, the brewery stayed in the hands of Good's descendants and his long-time business partner, William Burghardt. By the 1950s, the brewery became one of the largest breweries in the country, producing up to 150,000 barrels a year which were sold everywhere west of the Mississippi. In the early 1960s Tivoli continued to grow with the Hi-En-Brau brand.

When Loraine Good died in 1965, Carl and Joseph Occhiatio purchased the Tivoli-Union Brewery from the estate. The brothers immediately faced hardship when the Platte River flooded in 1965, damaging the brewery. One year later, a labor strike set the business back exponentially. In April 1969, the Tivoli Brewery closed for business. Until Tivoli closed, it was the second oldest continuously operating brewery in the country with Pennsylvania's Yuengling brewery being the only brewery with an existence surpassing that of Tivoli. After years of abandonment it was converted into a shopping center in the mid 1980s by architectural firm HOK. For some years, the property housed AMC 12-theater operation, later the Starz FilmCenter, which hosted the Denver Film Society's annual Denver Film Festival from 2001 to 2011.

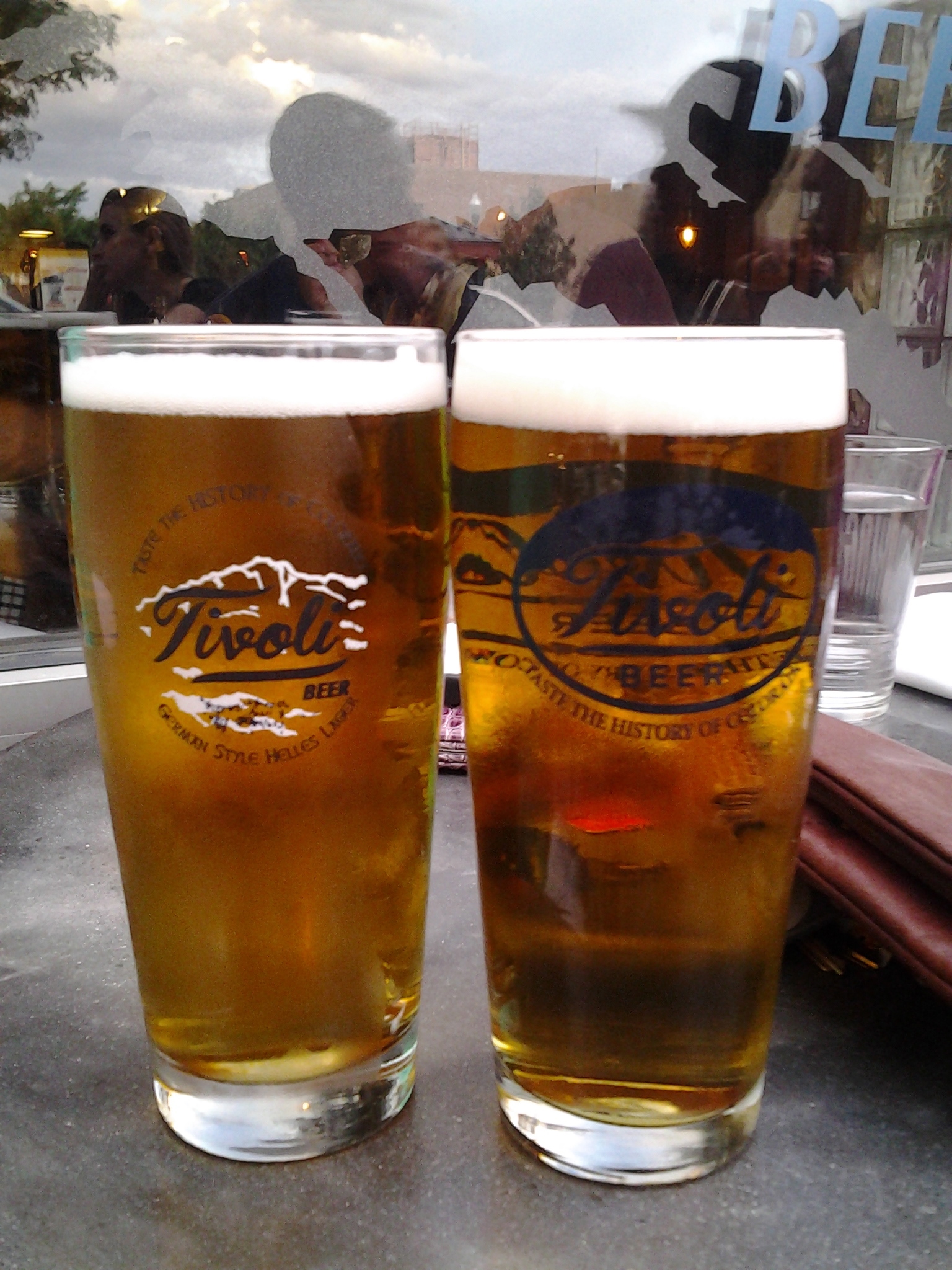
A German Helles Lager

Today, the building is home to the Tivoli Student Union of the Auraria Campus, serving as a student center for the Metropolitan State University of Denver, the University of Colorado Denver, and the Community College of Denver. While it is now used as meeting rooms and student group offices, many of the historic features still remain, including the copper brewing kettles and a barrel lift that is visible from two levels.

Tivoli Student Union entrance

Tivoli Brewing Co. has since been revived in 2012. The brewery serves as the center of the brewing and beer industry education programs at the schools that share the Auraria campus.

== See also ==
- Wiessner-American Brewery building
- Metropolitan State University of Denver
  - Auraria Campus
    - http://tivolibrewingco.com/
