= George J. Kempf House =

Historic house in Michigan, United States

- U.S. National Register of Historic Places
- Michigan State Historic Site
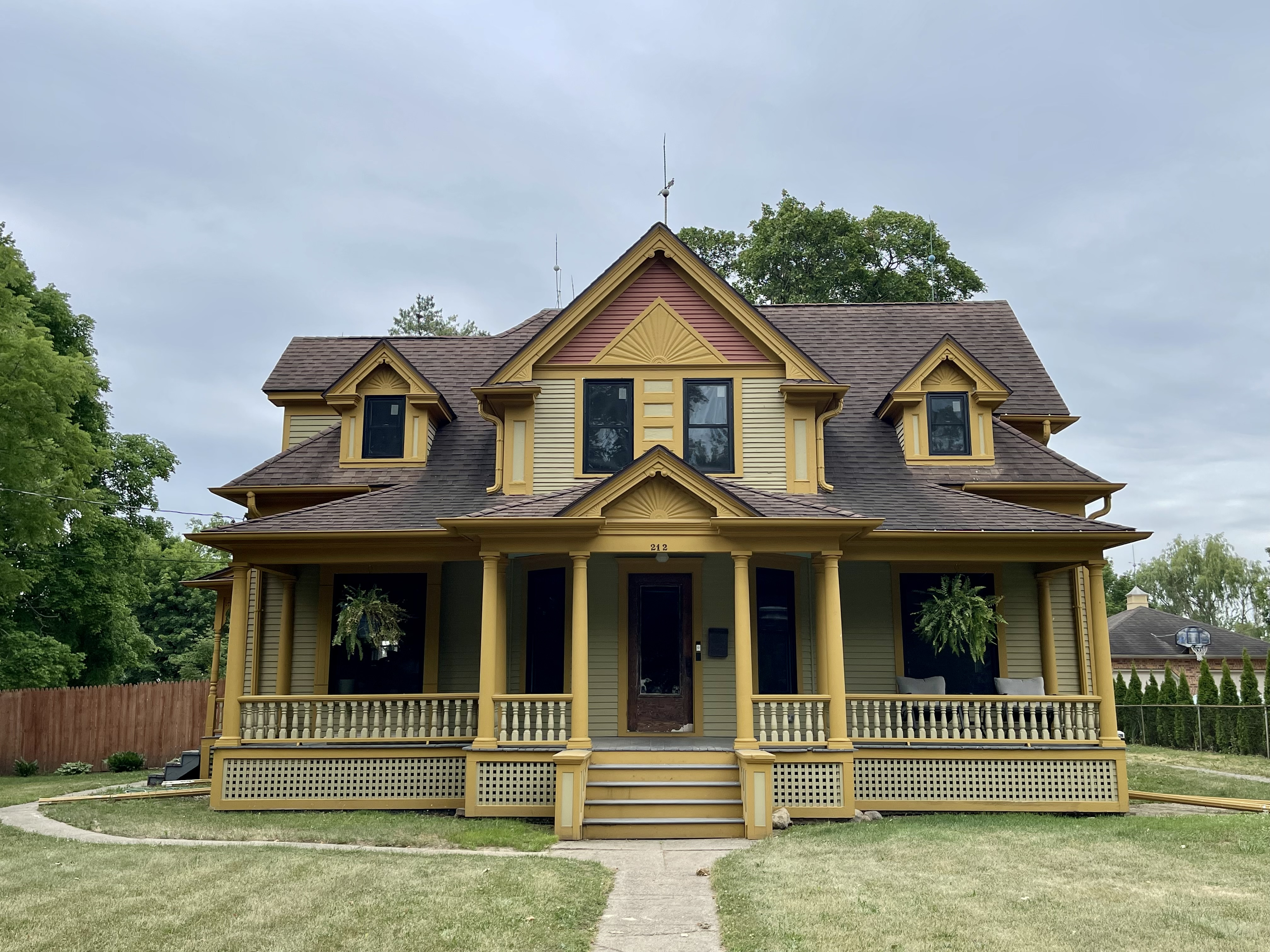

- Location within Michigan Location within the United States
- Interactive map
- Location: 212 East Kilbuck Street; Tecumseh, Michigan
- Coordinates: 42°00′04″N 83°56′33″W
- Built: 1905
- Architect: George Kempf
- Architectural style: Colonial Revival, Late Victorian, Queen Anne
- MPS: Tecumseh MRA
- NRHP reference No.: 86001570
- Added to NRHP: August 13, 1986

The George J. Kempf House is a privately owned residential house located at 212 East Kilbuck Street in Tecumseh, Lenawee County, Michigan. It was designated as a Michigan State Historic State and listed on the National Register of Historic Places on August 13, 1986. It is located just around the corner from the Joseph E. Hall House.

== History ==
The house was built in 1905 by architect George Kempf and embodies a mix of Colonial Revival, Late Victorian, and Queen Anne Style architecture. It is significant on the local level as a stylish turn-of-the-century, two-story house. George Kempf lived in the house, and he and his brother Henry built many local homes in Tecumseh around this time.

== Description ==
The Kempf House is a low, asymmetrical, two-story structure with an irregular plan. It has a hipped roof with additional gables and three dormers in the front. The central dormer contains two windows along with a triangular sunburst design in the gable peak; the smaller dormers to each side echo the decorative elements of the central dormer. The house is covered with clapboard. The front also contains a large porch with Tuscan columns.
