= Hall House (Little Rock, Arkansas) =

Historic house in Arkansas, United States

- U.S. National Register of Historic Places
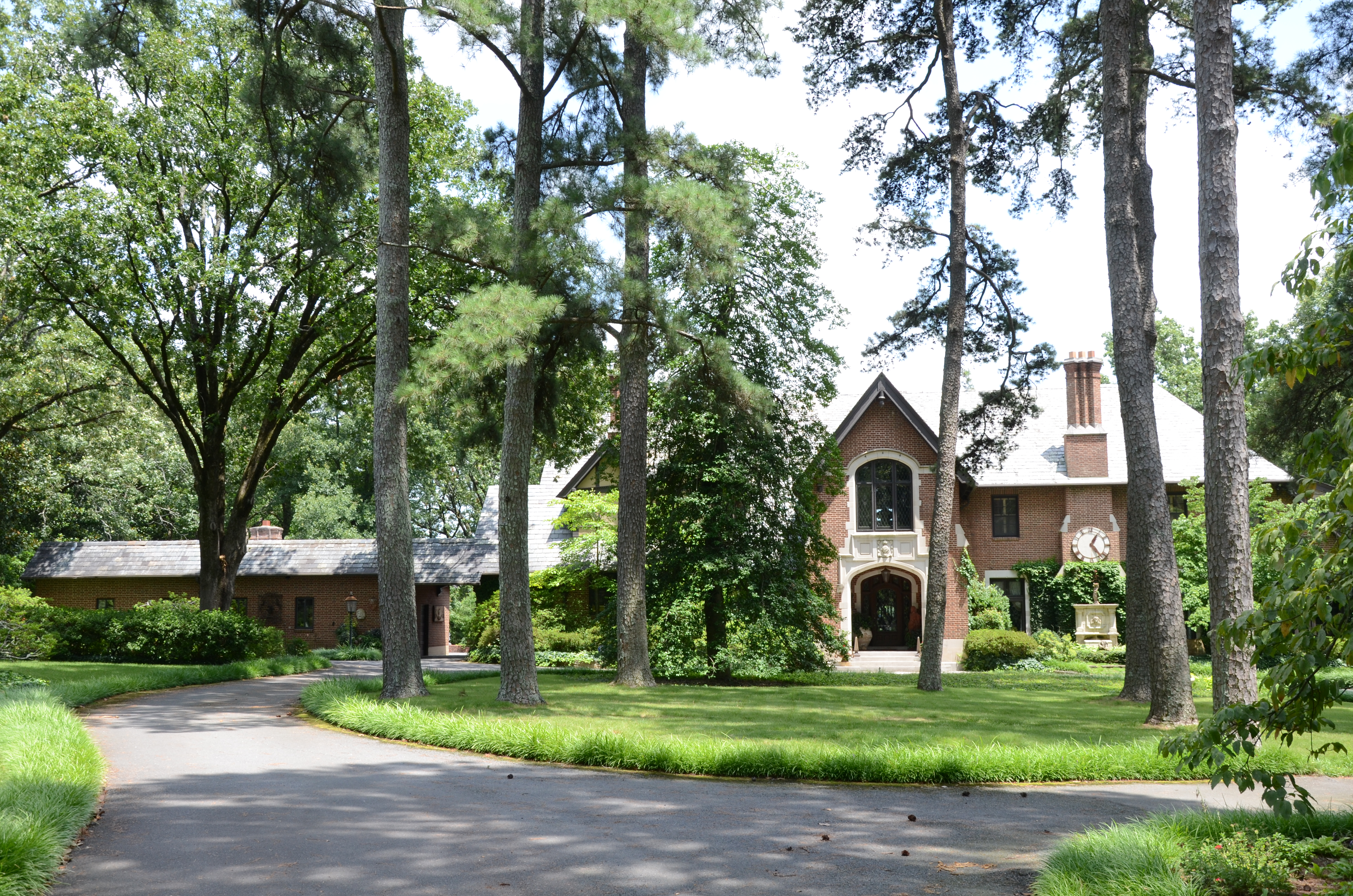

- Location within Arkansas Location within the United States
- Location: 32 Edgehill, Little Rock, Arkansas
- Coordinates: 34°46′4″N 92°19′4″W
- Built: 1928
- Architect: Thompson, Sanders, & Ginocchio
- Architectural style: Tudor Revival
- MPS: Thompson, Charles L., Design Collection TR
- NRHP reference No.: 82000897
- Added to NRHP: December 22, 1982

The Hall House is a historic house at 32 Edgehill Road in an exclusive neighborhood of Little Rock, Arkansas. It is a large two-story brick structure, set on a manicured landscape and appearing as an English country house. It has a two-story projecting entry pavilion, and large gabled dormers with half-timbered stucco finish. Built in 1928, it is one of the largest and most expensive residential commissions of the noted Arkansas firm of Thompson, Sanders & Ginocchio.

The house was listed on the National Register of Historic Places in 1982.

== See also ==
- National Register of Historic Places listings in Little Rock, Arkansas
