= Buchanan, Iowa =

- Unincorporated community
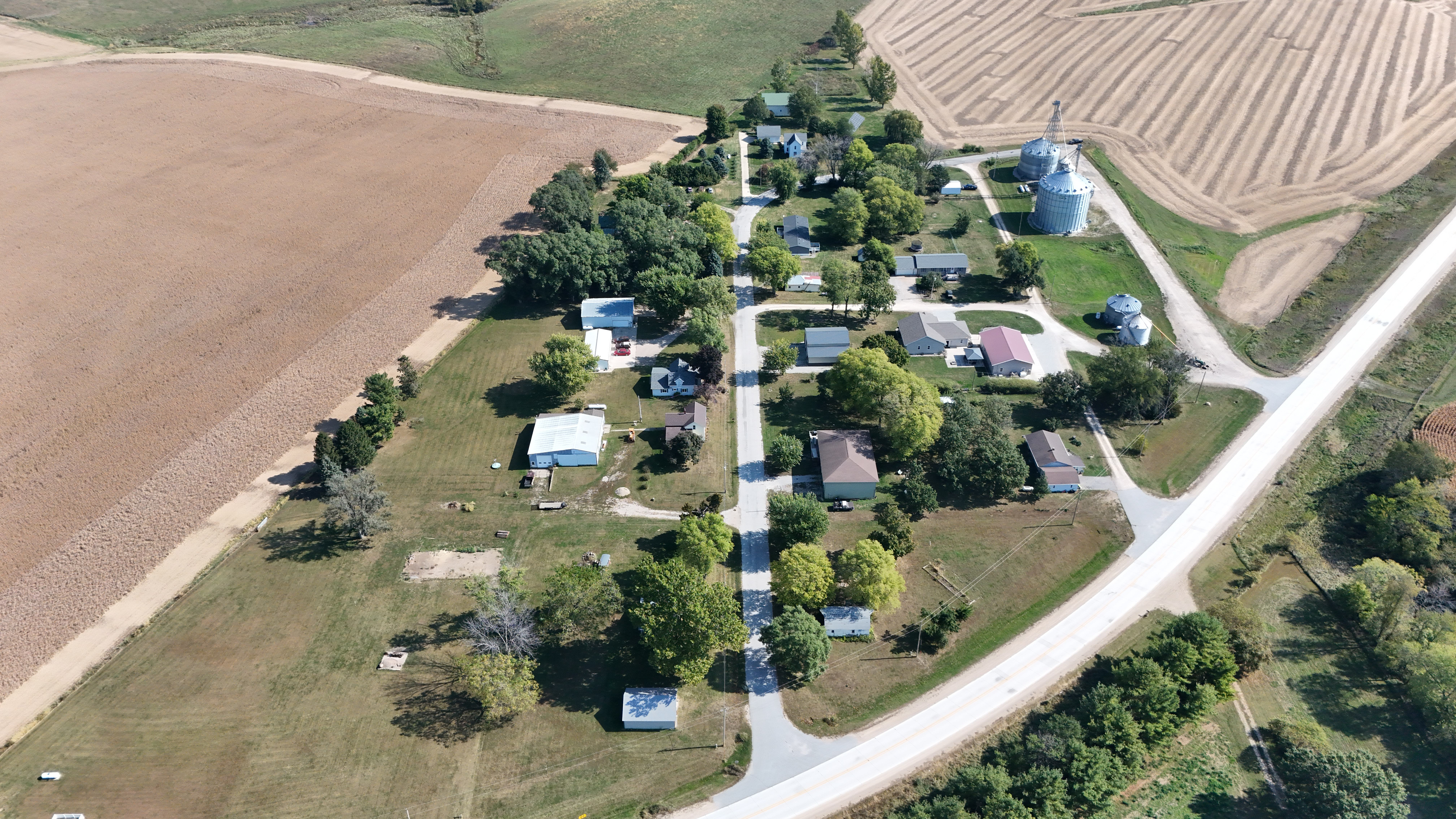
- Looking northeast along Main Street in Buchanan

- Location within Iowa
- Coordinates: 41°45′54″N 91°14′49″W
- Country: United States
- State: Iowa
- County: Cedar
- Elevation: 761 ft (232 m)
- Time zone: UTC-6 (Central (CST))
  - Summer (DST): UTC-5 (CDT)
- Area code: 563
- GNIS feature ID: 454910

Buchanan is an unincorporated community in Cedar County, Iowa, United States.

== History ==
It was named for Alexander Buchanan, a farmer who owned land near the original town site. Alexander Buchanan was born in Cedar County in 1841.

Buchanan's population was 27 in 1902, and 61 in 1925. The population was 50 in 1940.
