= Hazel Hall House =

Historic building in Portland, Oregon, U.S.

- U.S. National Register of Historic Places
- U.S. Historic district – Contributing property
- Portland Historic Landmark
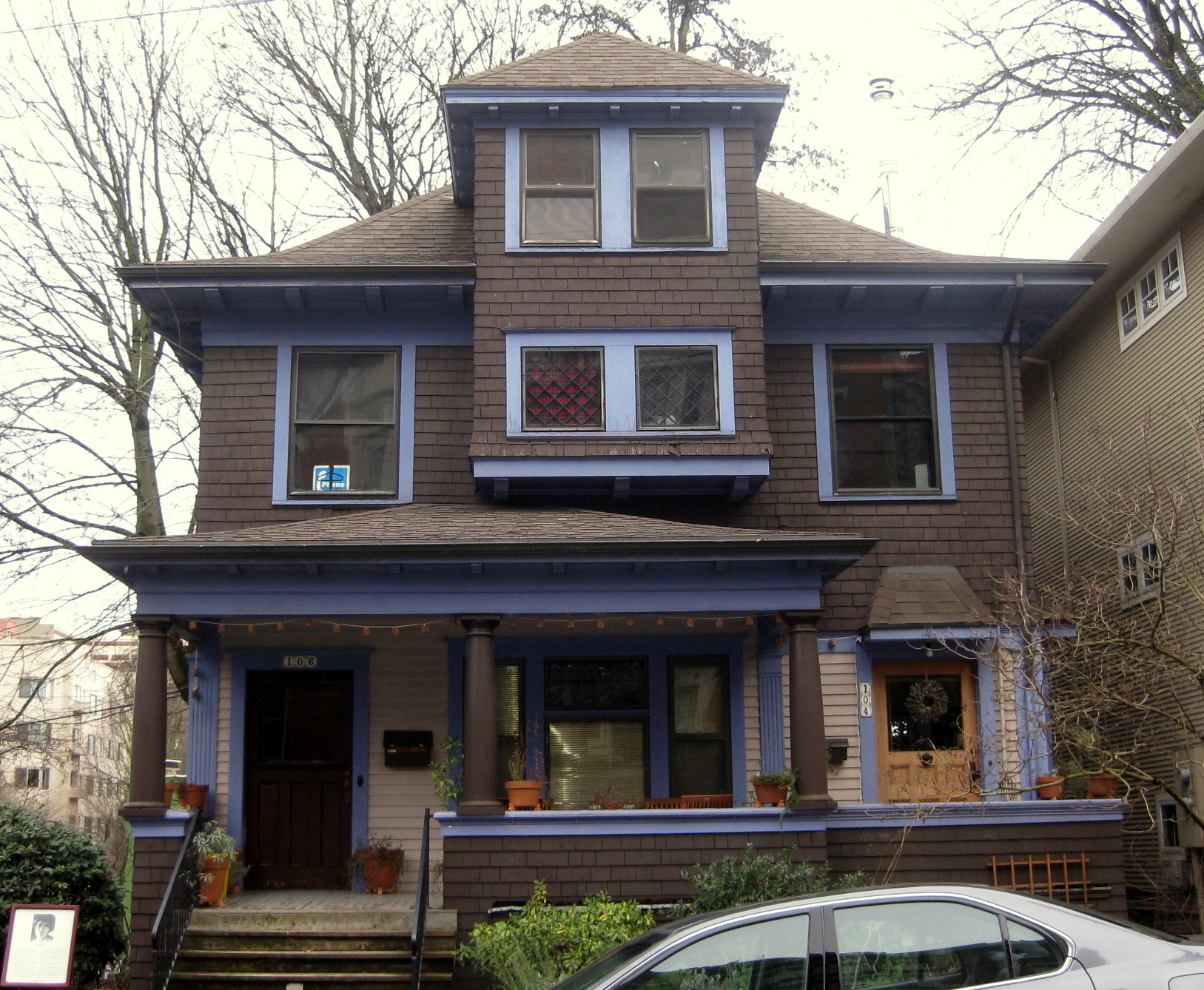
- Hazel Hall House in 2010

- Location within Oregon
- Location: 104–106 NW 22nd Place; Portland, Oregon
- Coordinates: 45°31′26″N 122°41′50″W
- Built: 1921
- Architect: Adolph F. Peterson
- Architectural style: Bungalow/Craftsman
- Part of: Alphabet Historic District (ID00001293)
- NRHP reference No.: 91000813
- Added to NRHP: June 19, 1991

The Hazel Hall House is in northwest Portland, in the U.S. state of Oregon. It is listed on the National Register of Historic Places. It was the home of poet Hazel Hall.

== See also ==
- National Register of Historic Places listings in Northwest Portland, Oregon
