= Barth Hotel =

- Union Warehouse
- U.S. National Register of Historic Places
- Colorado State Register of Historic Properties
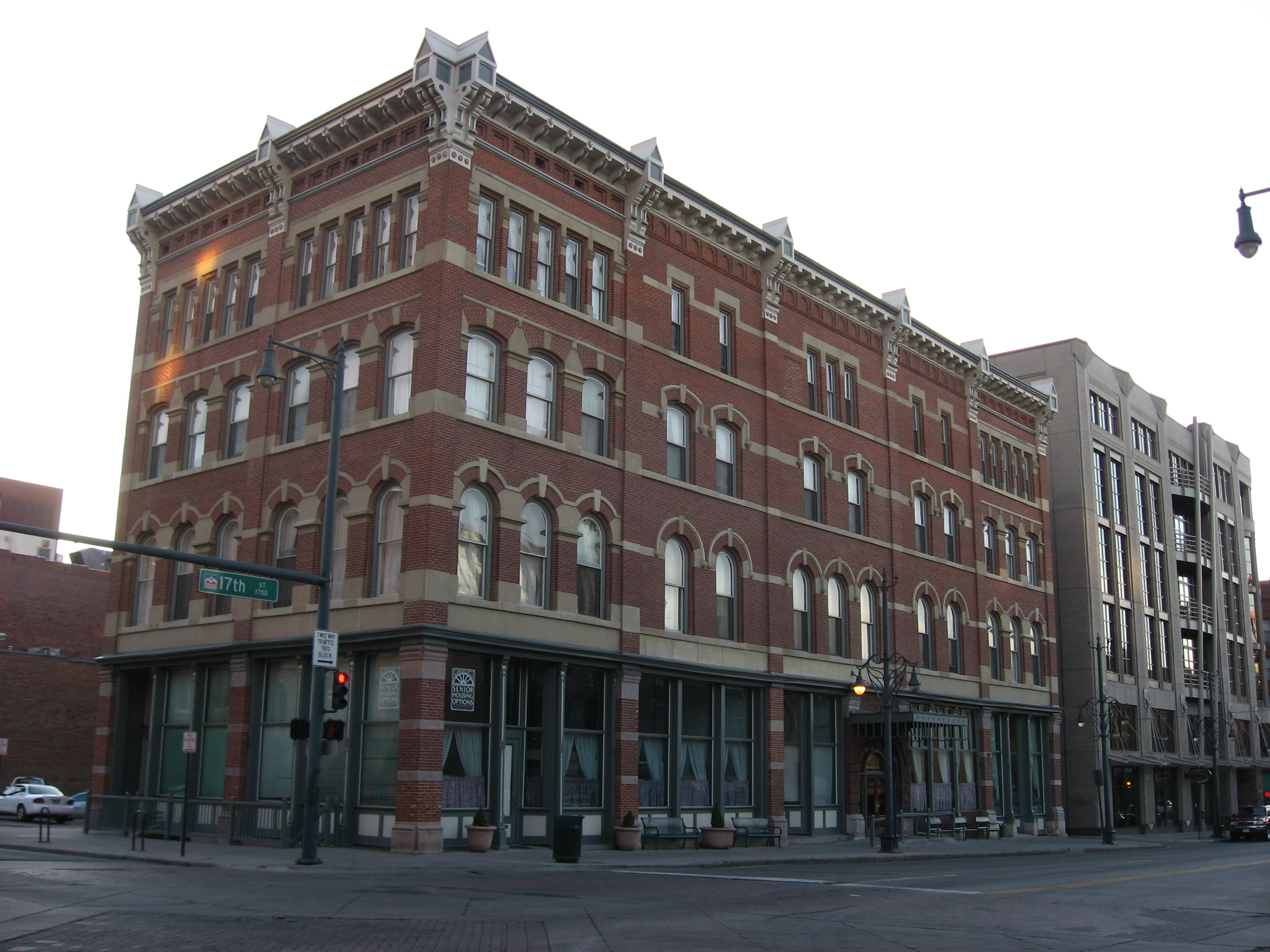

- Location within Colorado Location within the United States
- Location: 1514 17th St., Denver, Colorado
- Coordinates: 39°45′6″N 104°59′52″W
- Area: 0.1 acres (0.040 ha)
- Built: 1882
- Architect: Eberley, F.C.
- Architectural style: Late Victorian
- NRHP reference No.: 82002297
- CSRHP No.: 5DV.47.64
- Added to NRHP: June 03, 1982

The Barth Hotel, also known as the Union Warehouse, is located in Denver, Colorado. It was built in 1882 and was added to the National Register of Historic Places in 1982. In 1980, it was the oldest continuously operated hotel in Denver.

It has also been known as the Union Hotel, the New Union Hotel, the Elk Hotel, and the New Elk Hotel.

It is a four-story building with a 50 by 125 feet (15 m × 38 m) plan, designed by Denver architect F.C. Eberley. Its first floor is 18.33 feet (5.59 m) from floor to ceiling. Originally the hotel occupied the top three floors; only later was a hotel lobby added in the first floor.
