= Lewis Hall Mansion =

Historic house in West Virginia, United States

- U.S. National Register of Historic Places
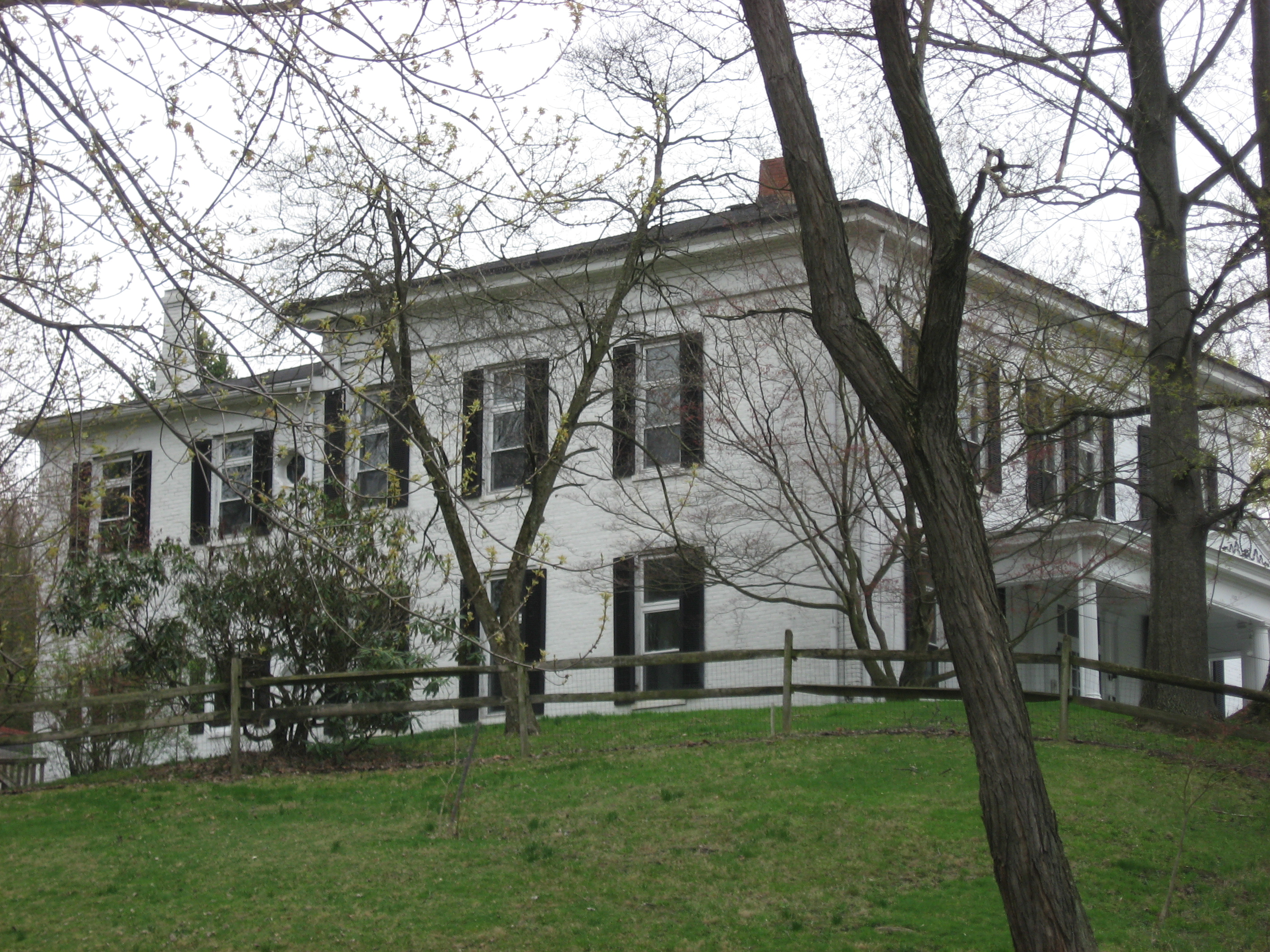

- Location within West Virginia Location within the United States
- Location: 1300 Pleasant Ave., Wellsburg, West Virginia
- Coordinates: 40°16′31″N 80°36′27″W
- Area: less than one acre
- Built: 1850
- Architectural style: Greek Revival
- MPS: Pleasant Avenue MRA
- NRHP reference No.: 86001074
- Added to NRHP: May 16, 1986

Lewis Hall Mansion, also known as the Charles H., III, and Sue Beall House, is a historic home located at Wellsburg, Brooke County, West Virginia. It was built in 1850, and is a two-story, rectangular brick dwelling in the Greek Revival style. It sits on a sandstone ashlar foundation and features a Neoclassical style portico built about 1910.

It was listed on the National Register of Historic Places in 1986.
