= Ralph Hall Farm District =

Historic district in North Dakota, United States

- U.S. National Register of Historic Places
- U.S. Historic district
- Location within North Dakota Location within the United States
- Nearest city: Carrington, North Dakota
- Coordinates: 47°29′42″N 99°8′27″W
- Area: 6.5 acres (2.6 ha)
- Built: 1898
- Built by: Carroll, Henry
- Architect: Saxton, Glen
- Architectural style: Classical Revival
- NRHP reference No.: 87001781
- Added to NRHP: October 1, 1987

The Ralph Hall Farm District near Carrington, North Dakota, United States is a farm that was developed in 1898. It was listed on the National Register of Historic Places in 1987. It includes Classical Revival architecture in one or more of its three contributing buildings.

The house was designed by architect Glen Saxton of Minneapolis; the house and barn were built by Henry Carroll.
