= Samuel Hall House =

Historic house in Wisconsin, United States

- U.S. National Register of Historic Places
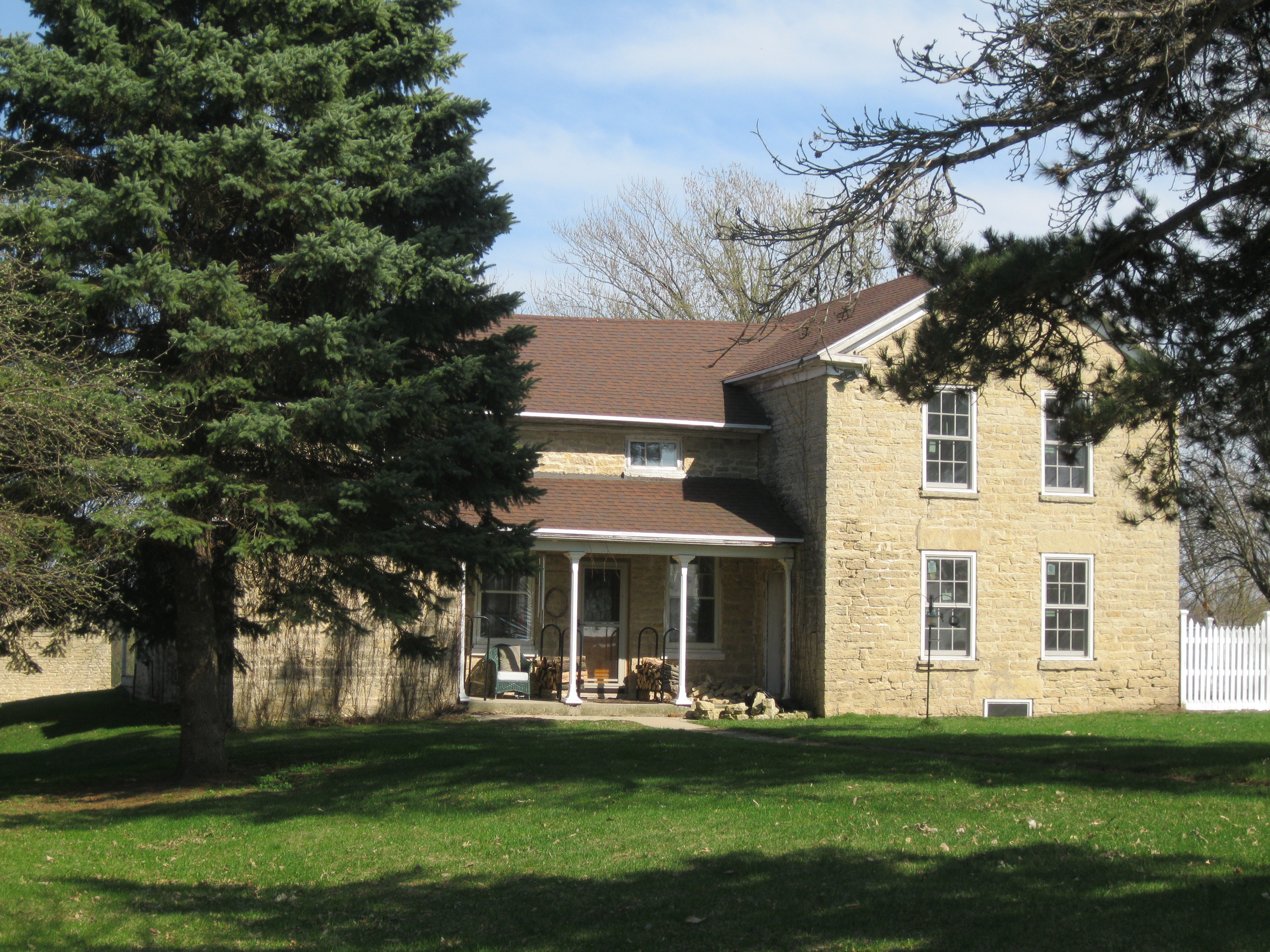
- Samuel Hall House
- Location: 924 Hillside Rd., Albion, Dane County, Wisconsin
- Coordinates: 42°54′03″N 89°02′31″W
- Area: 5 acres (2.0 ha)
- Built: 1856/1867
- Architectural style: Greek Revival
- NRHP reference No.: 93001445
- Added to NRHP: December 23, 1993

The Samuel Hall House is a Greek Revival-styled farmhouse built in 1856 in Albion, Dane County, Wisconsin. It was added to the State and the National Register of Historic Places in 1993.

Samuel Hall was born in Derbyshire, England in 1818. After farming there, he emigrated to America, and by 1844 he and his brother George were in Milwaukee. There they joined a party of English immigrants, also from Derbyshire, and they all came out to Albion Prairie, where the first whites had settled only three years before. These English arrivals mostly settled in a group. Some were skilled in masonry and in 1847 they built a brick church for their Primitive Methodist congregation. Samuel Hall was a member and helped with the project.

Early on, Samuel, his wife Sara, and his brother George lived with Isaac Bunting on the farm. In 1854 they bought the farm from Isaac: 233 acres. George and Samuel then split the farm, with Samuel getting 100 acres.

By 1856 Samuel was well-off enough to build a substantial house. The main block of the current house is the original house - a simple rectangle, two stories tall, with walls of coursed limestone. The style is Greek Revival, with the characteristic low-pitched roof, the cornice returns, and the symmetric placement of windows and door. Inside is a central staircase, typical for Greek Revival. A parlor on the first floor has elaborate baseboards and window trim. The rest of the house is trimmed more simply. The house originally had a summer kitchen as an ell where the stone wing is now - one story, built of wood.

Samuel's wife Sarah died in 1865. When she died, Samuel hired Ann Wright as a helper. They married the following year, and eventually had three children.

In 1867 Hall tore down the original summer kitchen and replaced it with a two-story ell with limestone walls like the original block, but simpler styling. An open porch runs along the side of the added wing. A one-story wing holding the kitchen was added at the same time.

The Primitive Methodist Church held its Sunday School Anniversary and Picnic on July 4 in Samuel's grove of trees. The Edgerton Independent announced the picnic in 1877:

Singing and speaking will commence at 9:30 a.m. after which there will be a table picnic provided by the ladies on the prairie, assisted by all who may come with their pies and cakes to make it a grand social gathering. After dinner, plays and sports of different kinds will commence, such as foot, wheel-barrow and sack racing, playing ball, dropping the handkerchief, old Miller, duck under the water kit, and many other plays that we are unable to think of, but be assured that the people of Albion Prairie know how to have a good time, and are bound to have it if the weather permits.

The farm includes some agricultural buildings. A 30-foot pig barn was built of limestone at the same time as the house and still stands. There is also a 90-foot wooden dairy barn and concrete silo built before the 1930s. Northeast of the barn is an 80-foot tobacco shed. There is also a poultry barn and various sheds.

Samuel died of pneumonia in 1888. His son George, 18 years old, quit school to take over the farm. He inherited both his father's and uncle's farms, and grew tobacco, grain, and hay, and raised pure-bred short-horned cattle and Polish China hogs. Descendants of Sam Hall farmed until 1951 - then rented out the farm.
