= David Hall House =

Historic house in Illinois, United States

- U.S. National Register of Historic Places
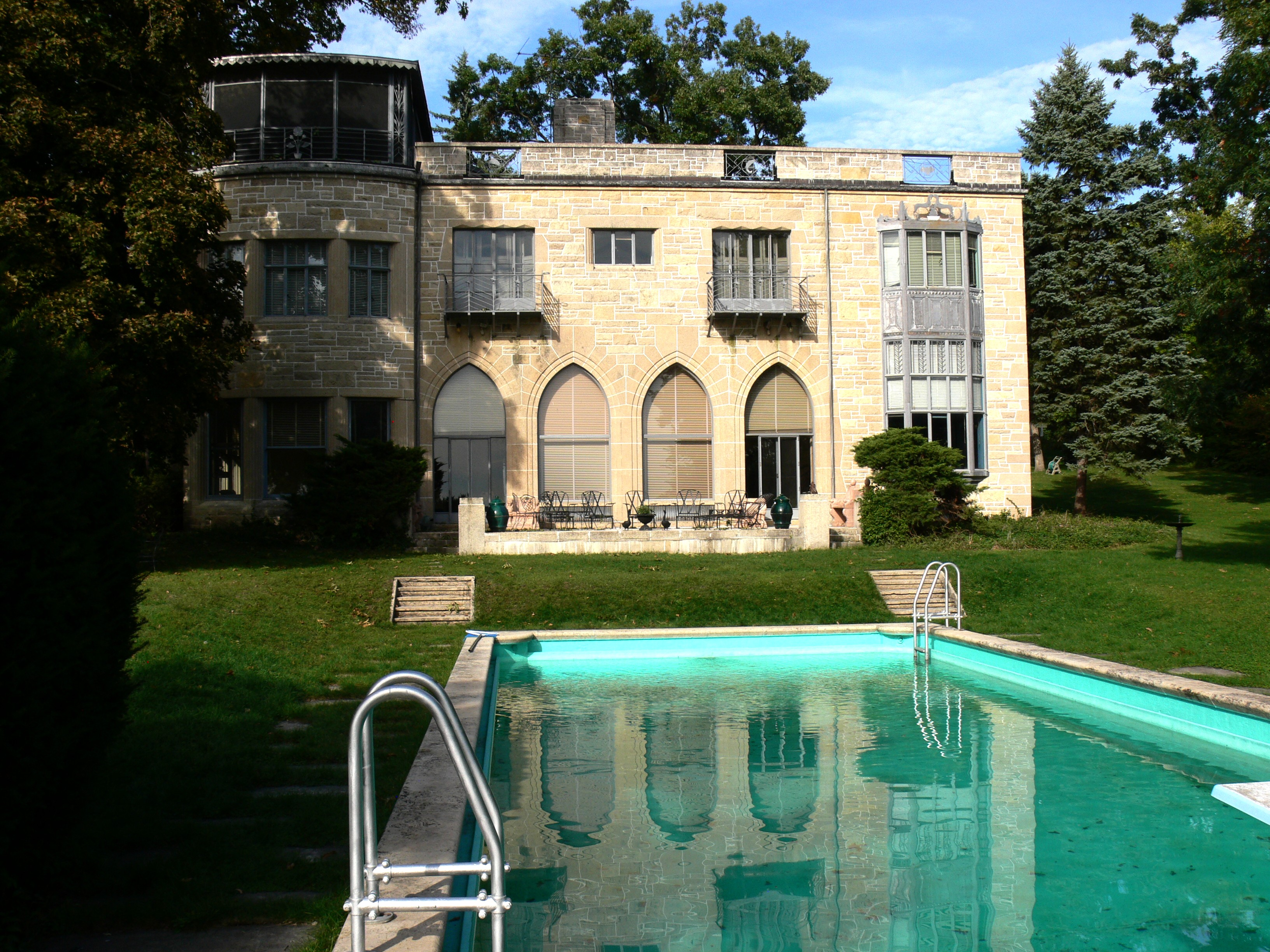

- Location within Illinois Location within the United States
- Location: 25420 W. Cedar Crest Ln., Lake Villa, Illinois
- Coordinates: 42°25′29″N 88°07′46″W
- Built: 1931
- Architect: Ralph Wesley Varney
- Architectural style: Art Deco
- NRHP reference No.: 14000506
- Added to NRHP: August 25, 2014

The David Hall House is a historic house at 25420 W. Cedar Crest Lane in Lake Villa, Illinois. The house was built in 1931 for David and May Cave Hall, a wealthy couple who settled in Lake Villa after taking summer vacations there for many years. Architect Ralph Wesley Varney designed the building in the Art Deco with elements of popular revival styles of the period. An unusual choice for a residential building, the use of Art Deco was likely inspired by May's travels to Hollywood in the 1920s. The house's design includes a rusticated limestone exterior, large Gothic arch windows, a triangular canopy above the entrance, a metal oriel window, and a stepped roof. Its grounds include a swimming pool and terrace garden.

The house was added to the National Register of Historic Places on August 25, 2014.
