= Israel Hall House =

Historic house in Iowa, United States

- U.S. National Register of Historic Places
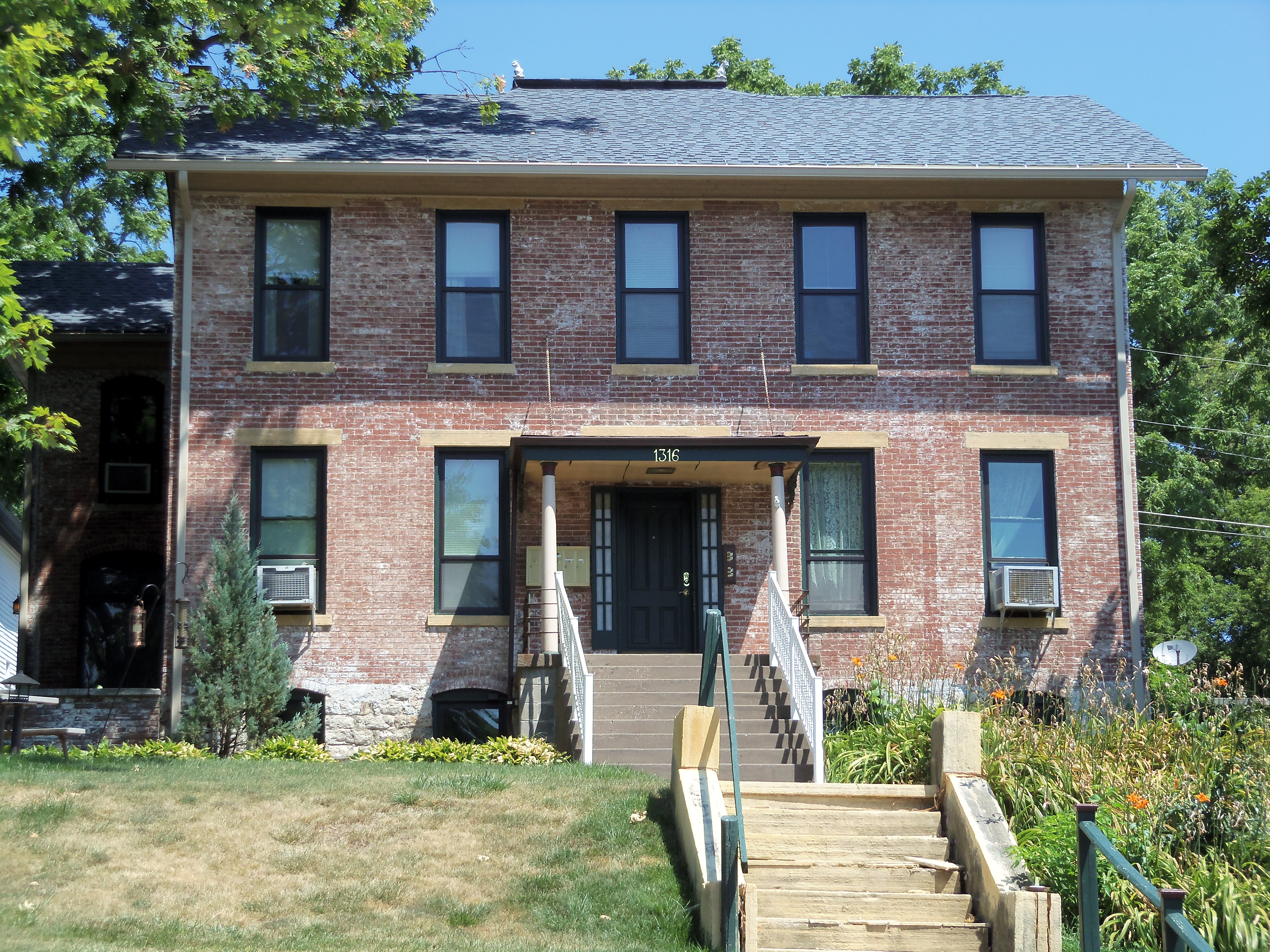

- Location within Iowa Location within the United States
- Location: 1316 E. 10th St. Davenport, Iowa
- Coordinates: 41°31′36″N 90°34′20″W
- Built: 1878
- Architectural style: Greek Revival
- MPS: Davenport MRA
- NRHP reference No.: 84001427
- Added to NRHP: July 27, 1984

The Israel Hall House is a historic building located on the east side of Davenport, Iowa, United States. By the time this house was built, Israel Hall had retired and was serving as the secretary-treasurer of the Oakdale Cemetery Corporation. He may have used it as a boarding house as well. The two-story brick house is a late example of the Greek Revival style. The side gable is influenced by the Georgian Revival as opposed to the temple front that is more typical of the Greek Revival. The round-arch window in the attic is typical feature found in Davenport residential architecture in this era. An addition to the back of the house was built around 1895. The house features a gabled roof, while the addition featured a hipped roof. The single bay porch on the front of the house replaced a full sized porch that was also not original, but replaced the original single-bay porch. The house rests on a raised lot and is set back from the street level. It has been listed on the National Register of Historic Places since 1984.
