= Philip Zang =

German-born American businessman and brewer (1826–1899)

- Born: February 15, 1826; Aschaffenburg, Bavaria
- Died: 18 February 1899 (aged 73); Denver, Colorado, U.S.
- Resting place: Riverside Cemetery, Denver, Colorado
- Occupations: Brewer; businessman
- Known for: Founder of Philip Zang Brewing Company in Denver
- Children: Adolph J. Zang
- Parents: John Zang (father); Fredericka Zang (mother)

Philip Zang (15 February 1826 in Aschaffenburg, Germany – 18 February 1899 in Denver, Colorado, US) was a German-born American businessman and brewer.

== Early life in Germany ==
Zang was born in 1826 in Aschaffenburg, in northwest Bavaria to John and Fredericka Zang. At the age of fourteen, Zang quit school and began working as an apprentice cooper and then as an apprentice brewer. After two and one-half years of apprenticeship, he worked his trade in various German breweries. Zang married Elizabeth Hurlebaus. In 1853, Zang, his wife and his brother Alexander emigrated to the United States and first landed in Philadelphia.

== Life in the United States ==
In Philadelphia, Zang began by learning English. His wife gave birth to Adolph J. Zang in 1856 but died in Chicago shortly thereafter.

In 1859, Zang moved to Louisville, Kentucky and founded the Phoenix Brewery. In 1869, he sold his business and moved to Denver, Colorado which had only been founded in 1858. There, he worked as a superintendent for the Rocky Mountain Brewing Company, a brewery founded in 1859. In 1871, he bought the Rocky Mountain Brewing Company and renamed it to Philip Zang & Co. in 1880. He greatly expanded the facilities and at one point, his brewery was the largest west of St. Louis, Missouri. In 1889, Zang sold the company to an English syndicate and appointed his son Adolph as general manager. The company was again renamed as Philip Zang Brewing Company.

In 2018, Zang and his son Adolph J. were inducted in the Colorado Business Hall of Fame.

== Life outside business ==
Zang served one term on the Denver City Council.

In 1870, he married Anna Barbara Buck, also a German immigrant who died in April 1896. Zang retired in 1895. He died in Denver in 1899 and is buried in the Riverside Cemetery in Denver.
