= Fred Hall House =

Historic house in Arkansas, United States

- U.S. National Register of Historic Places
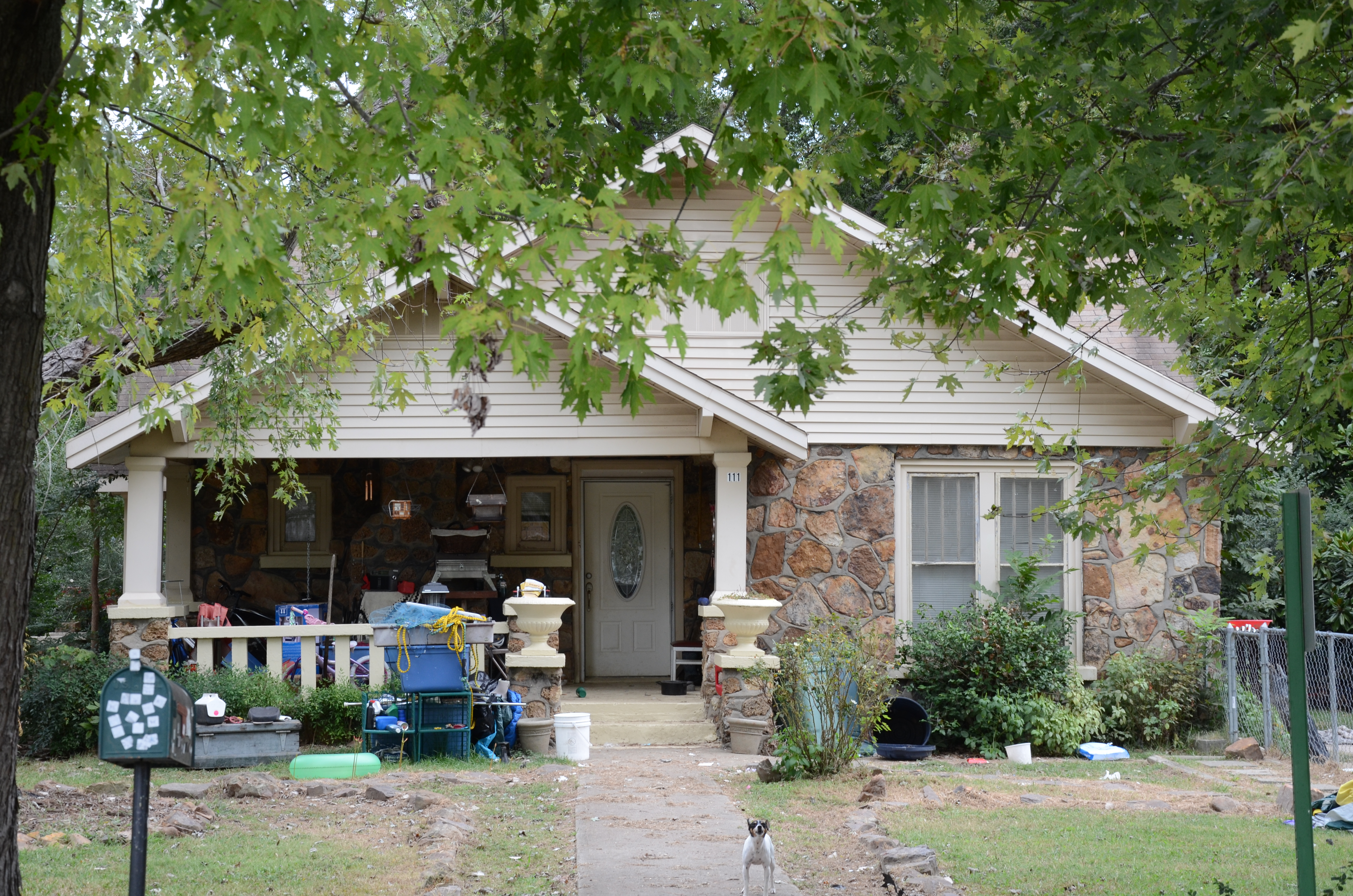

- Location within Arkansas Location within the United States
- Location: Jct. of 2nd and W. Searcy Sts., Kensett, Arkansas
- Coordinates: 35°13′58″N 91°40′7″W
- Area: less than one acre
- Built: 1930
- Built by: Fred Hall
- Architectural style: Bungalow/American craftsman
- MPS: White County MPS
- NRHP reference No.: 91001222
- Added to NRHP: September 5, 1991

The Fred Hall House is a historic house at 2nd and West Searcy Streets in Kensett, Arkansas. It is a 1 1/2-story wood-frame structure, finished in stone and composition shingles. It has a cross-gable roof configuration, with a gabled porch projecting from the left front. It is supported by sloping square wooden columns, and has exposed rafters. Built in 1930, it is a good local example of Craftsman architecture.

The house was listed on the National Register of Historic Places in 1991.

== See also ==
- National Register of Historic Places listings in White County, Arkansas
