= Joseph E. Hall House (Tecumseh, Michigan) =

Historic house in Michigan, United States

- U.S. National Register of Historic Places
- Michigan State Historic Site
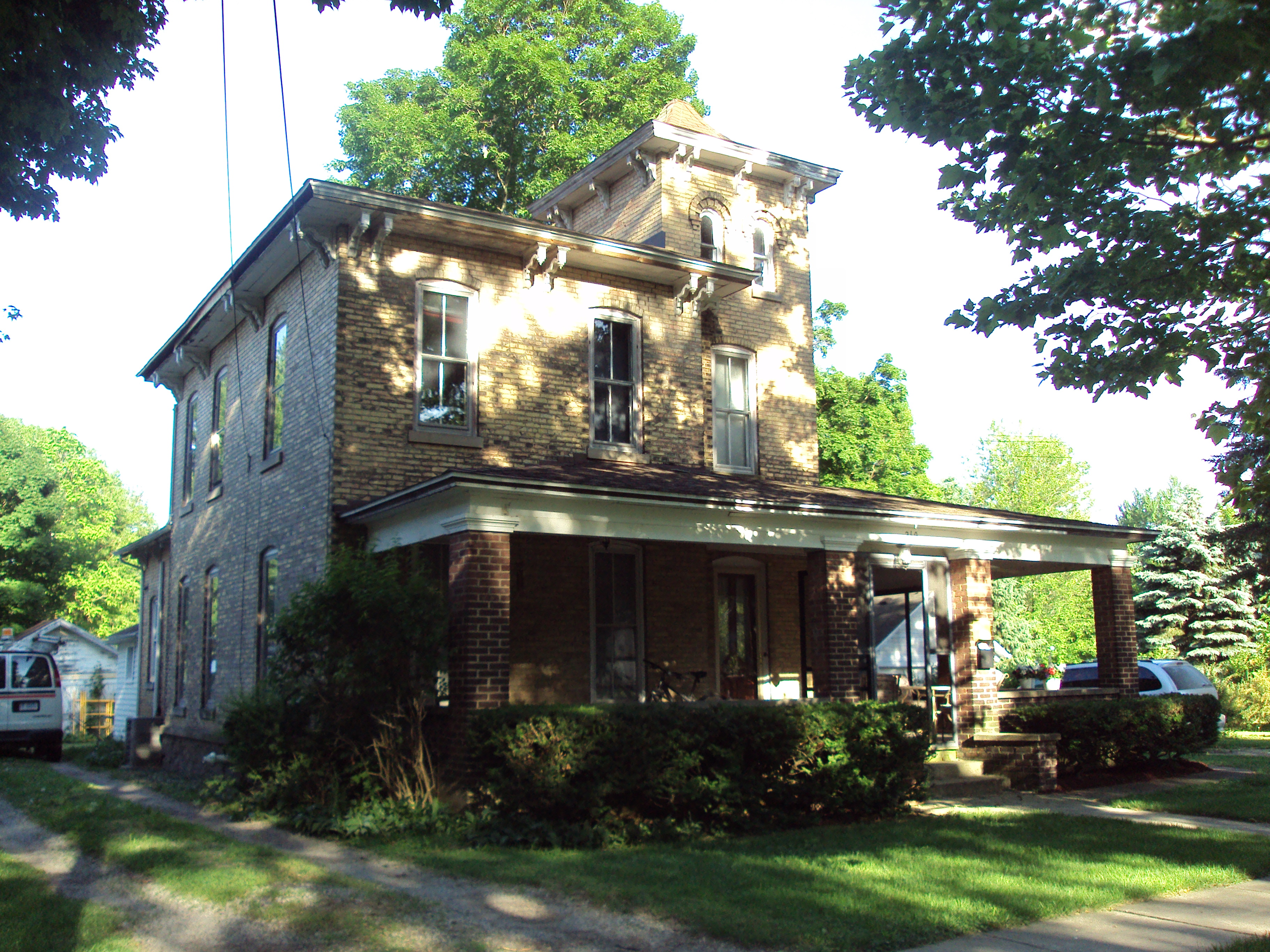

- Location within Michigan Location within the United States
- Interactive map
- Location: 210 South Oneida Street; Tecumseh, Michigan
- Coordinates: 42°00′07″N 83°56′30″W
- Built: c. 1870
- Architect: Salmon Crane
- Architectural style: Italianate, Late Victorian
- MPS: Tecumseh MRA
- NRHP reference No.: 86001566
- Added to NRHP: August 13, 1986

The Joseph E. Hall House is a privately owned residential house located at 210 South Oneida Street in the city of Tecumseh in Lenawee County, Michigan. It was designated as a Michigan State Historic State and listed on the National Register of Historic Places on August 13, 1986. It is located just around the corner from the George J. Kempf House.

== History ==
The house was built in as early as 1870 for Joseph E. Hall, a local jeweler and instrument maker. It was designed and constructed by Salmon Crane, who was a leading architect in Tecumseh in the second half of the nineteenth century. Hall and his family lived here until 1882, when it was purchased by Sylvester Erskine, a barber and saloon keeper.

== Description ==
The house was designed in the style mix of Italianate and Late Victorian architecture. It is a modestly sized brick house, typical of those built in the area at the time. It is noted for its irregular L-shaped design, which features a square tower located between the arms of the L. The house has widely projecting eaves supported by simple paired brackets. Window openings in the main section have segmental-arch heads without caps, while in the tower they have round heads and corbelled brick caps. A hip-roof, brick-pier porch wraps around the front of the house and part of one side.
