= Kopper's Hotel and Saloon =

- U.S. National Register of Historic Places
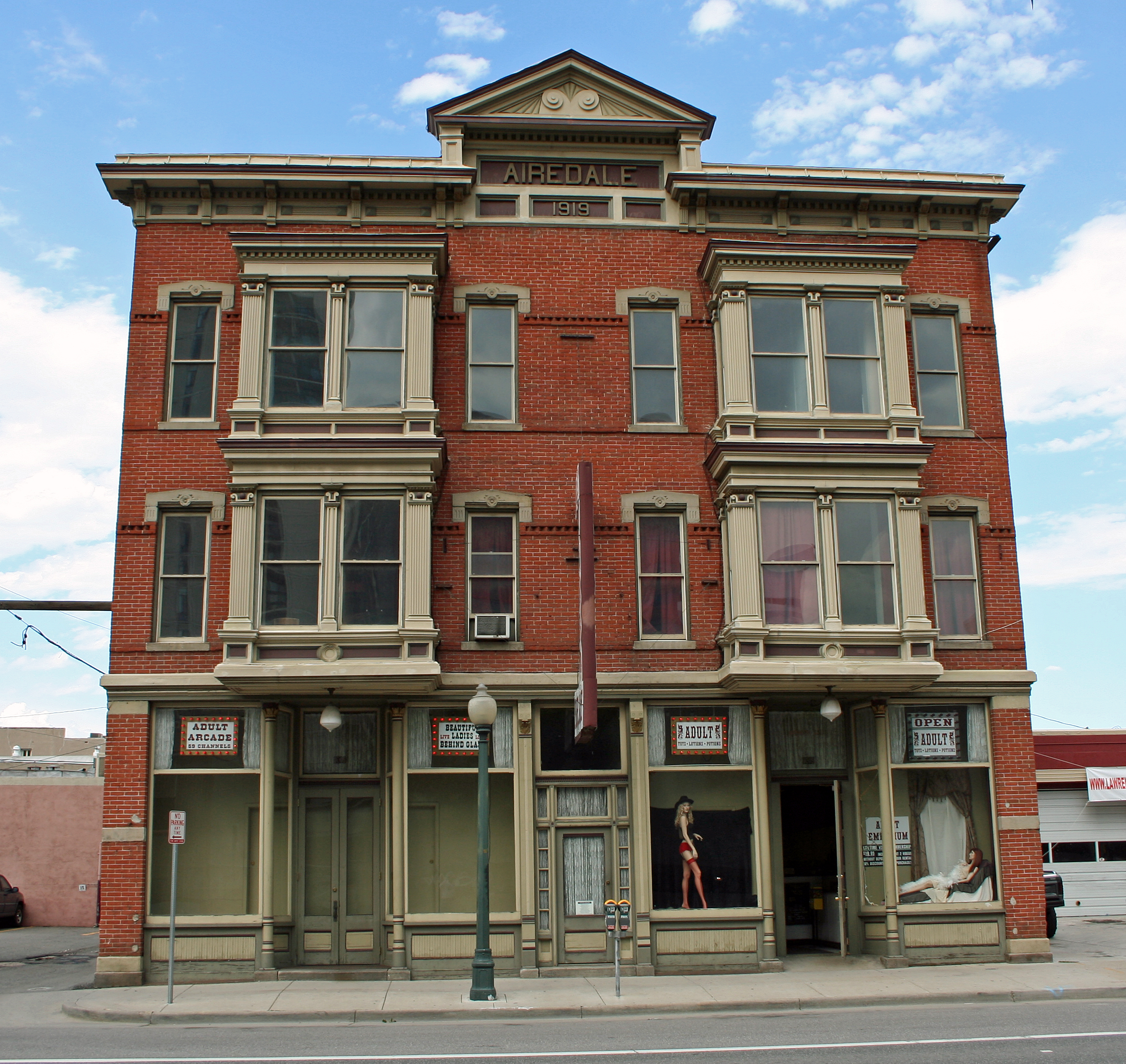

- Location within Colorado Location within the United States
- Location: 1215-1219 20th St., Denver, Colorado
- Coordinates: 39°45′10″N 104°59′29″W
- Area: less than one acre
- Built: 1889
- Architect: Eberley, Frederick Carl
- Architectural style: Queen Anne
- NRHP reference No.: 98001378
- Added to NRHP: June 4, 1999

Kopper's Hotel and Saloon, also known as the Airedale Building, is a National Register of Historic Places listed building in Denver, Colorado. It was designed by Frederick C. Eberley. The Hotel and Saloon was constructed in 1889. The building was renamed the Airedale in 1919 and the pediment was modified accordingly. The facade is not believed to have undergone any other major changes at the time.

It was a working-class hotel. The saloon closed down due to statewide prohibition and the property was sold by its German owner (Albert Kopper, a Bavarian immigrant) at a time when anti-German sentiment was strong during World War I. It continued to be used as a hotel and rooming house into the 1970s.

The building is an example of Queen Anne commercial style architecture. The first floor has been extensively remodeled, but the upper floors remain largely intact.

German immigrants and their bar culture figured prominently in Denver culture of the 1880s when one third of Denver's saloonkeepers were German-born. Many of the bars were located along Market St. and Larimer St. to the southwest of Kopper's Saloon.

The building has been home to a porn shop.
