= Molly Brown (disambiguation) =

Molly Brown (1867–1932) was an American activist and Titanic survivor.

Molly Brown may also refer to:

- Molly Brown (actress), actress from Dexter: Original Sin
- Molly Brown (pageant titleholder), Miss Tennessee USA 1987
- Molly Brown, nickname of the Gemini 3 space capsule
- Molly Brown House, historical home in Denver, Colorado

== See also ==
- The Unsinkable Molly Brown (disambiguation)
