= John F. Campion =

Canadian-American executive in mining and sugar production (1849–1916)

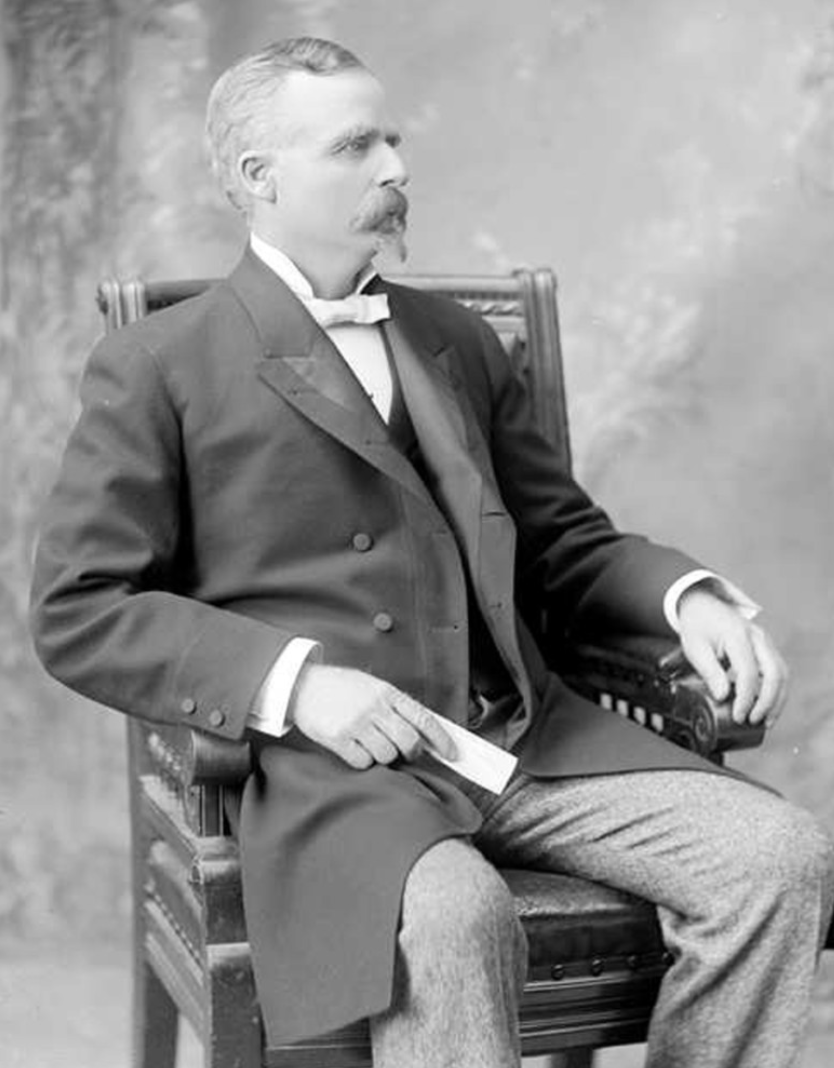
- Born: John Francis Campion; December 1849; Prince Edward Island, Canada
- Died: July 17, 1916 (aged 67–68); Denver, Colorado, United States
- Occupations: Miner, investor, philanthropist

Signature
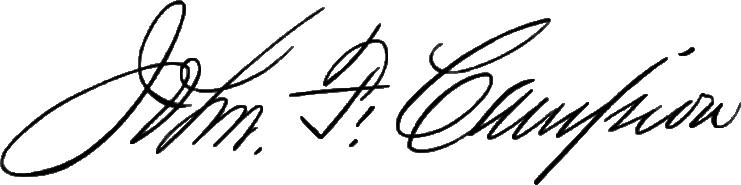

John Francis Campion (December 1849 – July 17, 1916) was a wealthy Canadian-American who made his fortune in mining and sugar production. He was also an executive and investor in banking, railroad, insurance, and other businesses.

Campion ran away from school as a teen to join the Union Navy during the American Civil War. After the end of the war, Campion became a miner and became an expert on the geology of mining. He fought to maintain possession of his mining interests early in his career, and he became increasingly successful, founding the Ibex Mining Company in Leadville, Colorado in 1891. Two years later, an ore stream was found at the mine that made him a fortune.

He was a co-founder of what is now called the Denver Museum of Nature and Science and was president of the board of trustees until his death in 1916. He donated his rare collection of native gold, which is among the best in the world.

== Early life ==
John Francis Campion was born in December 1849 (Note: Of the public records, the 1900 United States Federal Census shows that he was born in December 1849. A biography by Wilbur Fiske Stone also states he was born in December 1849. There are reliable sources that state that he was born in 1849 and also 1848. There are no reliable sources for his month and day of birth. His military records would show a year of birth of 1848 or earlier to be accepted as a soldier during the Civil War. He is said to have enlisted at age 16, but stated he was 17.) on Prince Edward Island, Canada to Helen (née Fehan) Campion and Michael Brevort, a shipbuilder and legislator. His grandparents, John F. Campion, Sr. and Elizabeth Campion, were Irish immigrants who settled in Price Edward Island in 1823. The family had been wealthy landowners in Ireland and England.

Campion was the eldest of four children born to Helen and M. Brevort Campion. He was followed by George F., born in 1849, Mary Ellen, born in 1854, and Elizabeth Margaret, born in 1857. By 1862, the Campions moved to Sacramento, California, when John and George returned to Canada and attended Prince of Wales College in Charlottetown, Prince Edward Island.

== American Civil War ==
Campion ran away from school at the age of 16 and joined the United States Navy during the Civil War. He was recorded as having enlisted at the age of 17. His brother George tried to enlist, too, but he was refused because at age 15 he was too young. Campion began his service as assistant quartermaster on the USS Dolphin, which met General William Tecumseh Sherman's army and delivered dispatches at Savannah, Georgia, at the conclusion of Sherman's March to the Sea. Campion returned to his parents in Sacramento after the end of the war.

== Mining ==
Campion began his mining career in California and lost his investment of $5,000 (equivalent to $124,329 in 2024) in the White Pine silver mine in Nevada when a large consolidating mining company drove him out. He made a fortune by developing and selling properties in Eureka, California. John bought the Pioche-Phoenix silver mine in Pioche, Nevada, after he moved to the area with his brother and father. He hired gunfighters to protect his interest in the mine from Raymond and Ely mining company and their gunfighters, who tried to overtake the concern in January 1873. The case went to court and Campion retained possession of the property. He sold the mine before he returned to Canada.

In 1878, Campion was elected a member of the parliament of Prince Edward Island for a one-year term. At the end of the term, Campion, his father, and brother moved to Leadville, Colorado. Campion attracted investors because of his thorough knowledge of geology of the Leadville area, that enabled him to find large veins and predict the direction of ore deposits. This was key to his success in Leadville where the "geological strata was broken and displaced by many faults".

He founded the Iron Hill Consolidated Mining Company in 1879. By 1889, he had purchased "many mines". Campion bought the Little Jonny Mine in 1890. He formed Ibex Mining Company in 1891. The following year Eben Smith and James Joseph Brown (husband of Margaret "Molly" Brown) bought interests in the organization. Ibex owned the Little Jonny Mine, where dolomite sand had filled any shafts that were dug and was on the verge of closing. Leadville fell into a depression with the collapse of the silver marker. In 1893, Campion invested $30,000 (equivalent to $1,049,889 in 2024) in the mine. That year, Charles Boettcher also invested in the company. Campion hired Brown to solve the problem, which he did by adding more timbering and inserting bales of hay to avoid collapse. Brown was paid in shares of the company. The firm paid out $1 million (equivalent to $34,996,296 in 2024) in annual dividends to its stockholders beginning in 1894. The area became known as the Leadville Gold Belt, where modern mining practices and machinery was used to extend the life of mines. He also mined in Breckenridge, Colorado.

Campion named his mines after animals with horns or antlers, such as Bison, Elk, Caribou, Wapiti, Yak, and Caribou. He called the Little Jonny Mine Ibex Number 1. His big gold strike at the Little Jonny Mine made him and his partners rich. James Joseph Brown's wife Margaret "Molly" Brown won fame in the sinking of the great liner Titanic.

During the Leadville miners' strike of 1896–97, Campion hired labor spies to infiltrate the Cloud City Miners' Union, Local 33 of the Western Federation of Miners. Spy reports compiled by the Thiel Detective Agency and forwarded to John Campion are currently housed at the Colorado Historical Society (now known as History Colorado).

== Other business ventures ==
Campion was vice president of the Denver National Bank and an officer of the Carbonate National Bank of Leadville. He was president of the Northwestern Terminal Company and vice president of the Denver, Northwestern and Pacific Railway (also called Moffat Road). He was president of the Big Horn Mining and Cattle Company.

After 1900, Campion made a second fortune growing sugar beets. Campion and Boettcher partnered on the formation of the Great Western Sugar Company, and brought sugar beet agriculture to Colorado. They also co-founded the Ideal Cement Company. He was vice president of Denver's Seventeenth Street Building Company. Campion was an owner of the Leadville Light and Power Company.

== Civic and cultural endeavors ==
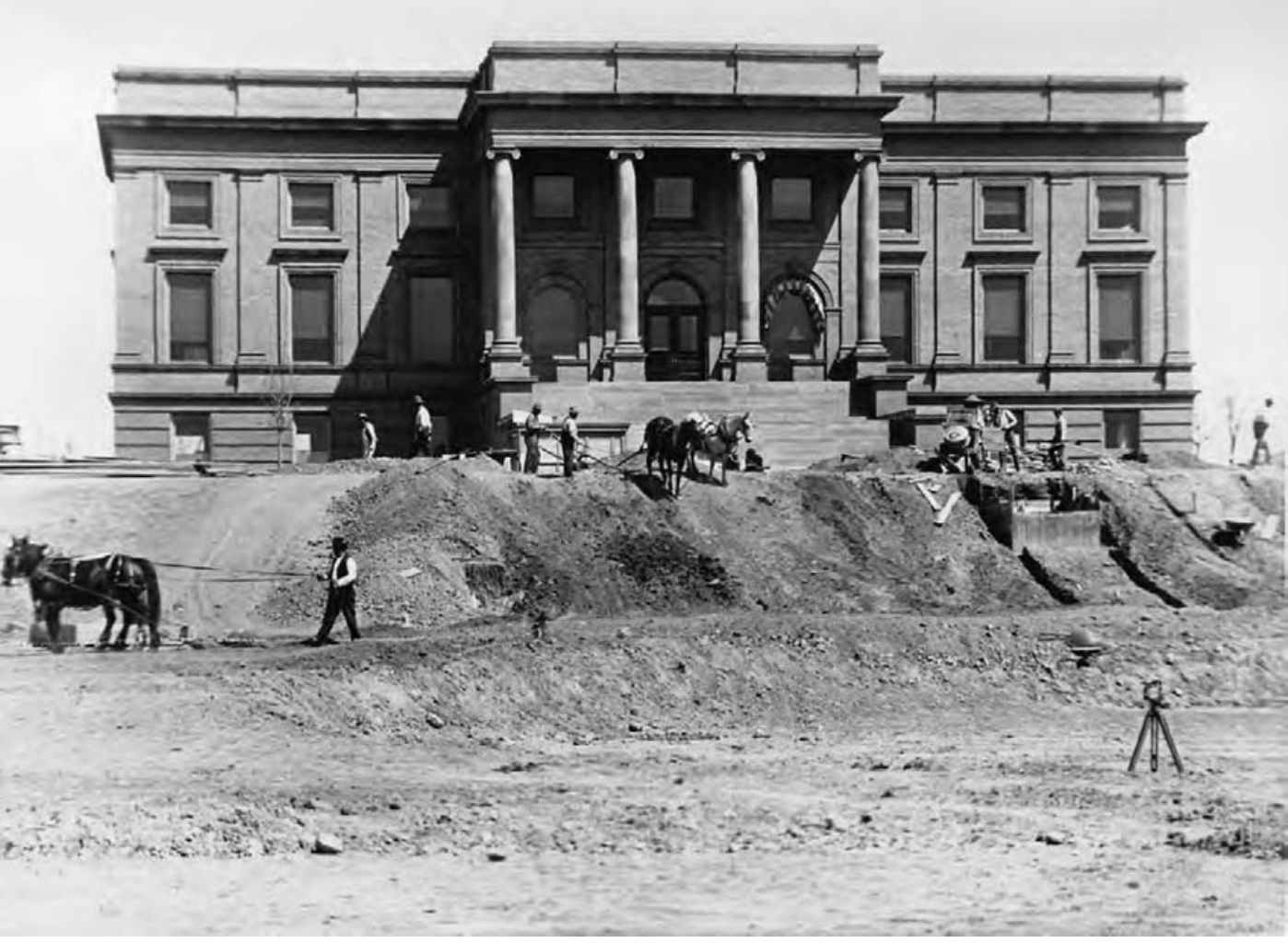
Colorado Museum of Natural History, 1908 (now the Denver Museum of Nature and Science)

Campion was a co-founder of the Denver Museum of Natural History (now the Denver Museum of Nature and Science). He donated his gold collection of 600 specimens. It is one of the best collections of native gold in the world, and it includes some of the "finest examples of crystallized gold". The museum was incorporated in 1900. He was the museum's first president of the board of trustees until his death in 1916.

Campion was president of the Denver Chamber of Commerce from 1898 to 1899 and of the Municipal Art League of Denver. He was a member of the American Association for the Advancement of Science. He also gave money toward the construction of the Cathedral Basilica of the Immaculate Conception. The bell in the east tower is dedicated to his memory.

== Personal life ==
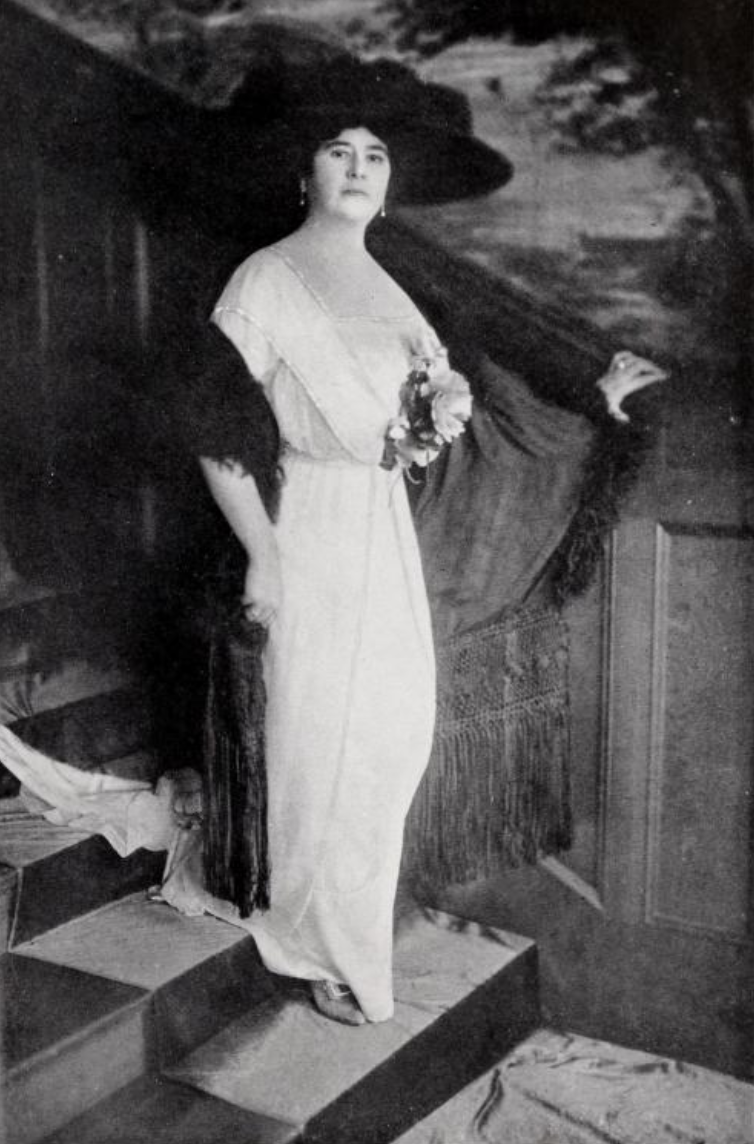
Mrs. John F. Campion, Colorado Representative Women of 1914

Campion married Nella "Nellie" May Daly, the daughter of Thomas Daly, Capitol Life Insurance Company founder, in Denver on April 15, 1895. By 1900, they lived in Denver at a house built at 800 Logan Street in 1899. At the time, it was one of the few houses in the city to have electricity, which ran off its own onsite power plant. They also had a residence at Twin Lakes near Leadville, where Campion had business offices.

Nellie was mentioned in the Colorado representative women of 1914:

A very beautiful woman, a gracious hostess of many brilliant social functions, and a fine mother, whose charming personality has made her well beloved, both in her beautiful home and in social life. Mrs. Campion is very benevolent and there are few large charitable enterprises in Colorado in which she is not a prominent factor.

Campion and Nellie had four children: John F. Jr., born in 1896, Helen Margaret, born in 1899, Mary, Phyllis born in 1901, and George Roland, born in 1902.

Campion died on July 17, 1916, in Denver, Colorado. (Note: When he died, the chimes that he donated were played at the Cathedral Basilica of the Immaculate Conception. Until that time, the chimes were only sounded for the death of Pope Pius (presumably Pope Pius X).) He is buried in the Campion mausoleum at the Mt. Olivet Cemetery in Wheat Ridge, Colorado.

== Legacy ==
Campion was inducted into the National Mining Hall of Fame in 2003. His biography on their website states:

John F. Campion's energy, intelligence, and drive were key factors in the development of the mining industry in Leadville, Colorado. Widely known as "Leadville Johnny," he built a fortune in mining, was successful in a variety of other businesses, and contributed greatly to cultural activity in Colorado.

The community of Campion, Colorado is named after him.

A collection of his papers is held at the John F. Campion Papers, Alfred M. Bailey Library & Archives, Denver Museum of Nature & Science.
