= Molly Brown House =

Historic house in Colorado, United States

- U.S. National Register of Historic Places
- Colorado State Register of Historic Properties
- Molly Brown House Museum in 2025

- Location within Colorado Location within the United States
- Interactive map showing the location of Molly Brown House
- Location: 1340 Pennsylvania St., Denver, Colorado
- Coordinates: 39°44′15.0″N 104°58′50.6″W
- Area: less than one acre
- Built: 1889
- Architect: William A. Lang, Land Developers John W. Smith and George W. Clayton
- Architectural style: Queen Anne Richardsonian Romanesque
- NRHP reference No.: 72000269
- CSRHP No.: 5DV.178
- Added to NRHP: February 1, 1972

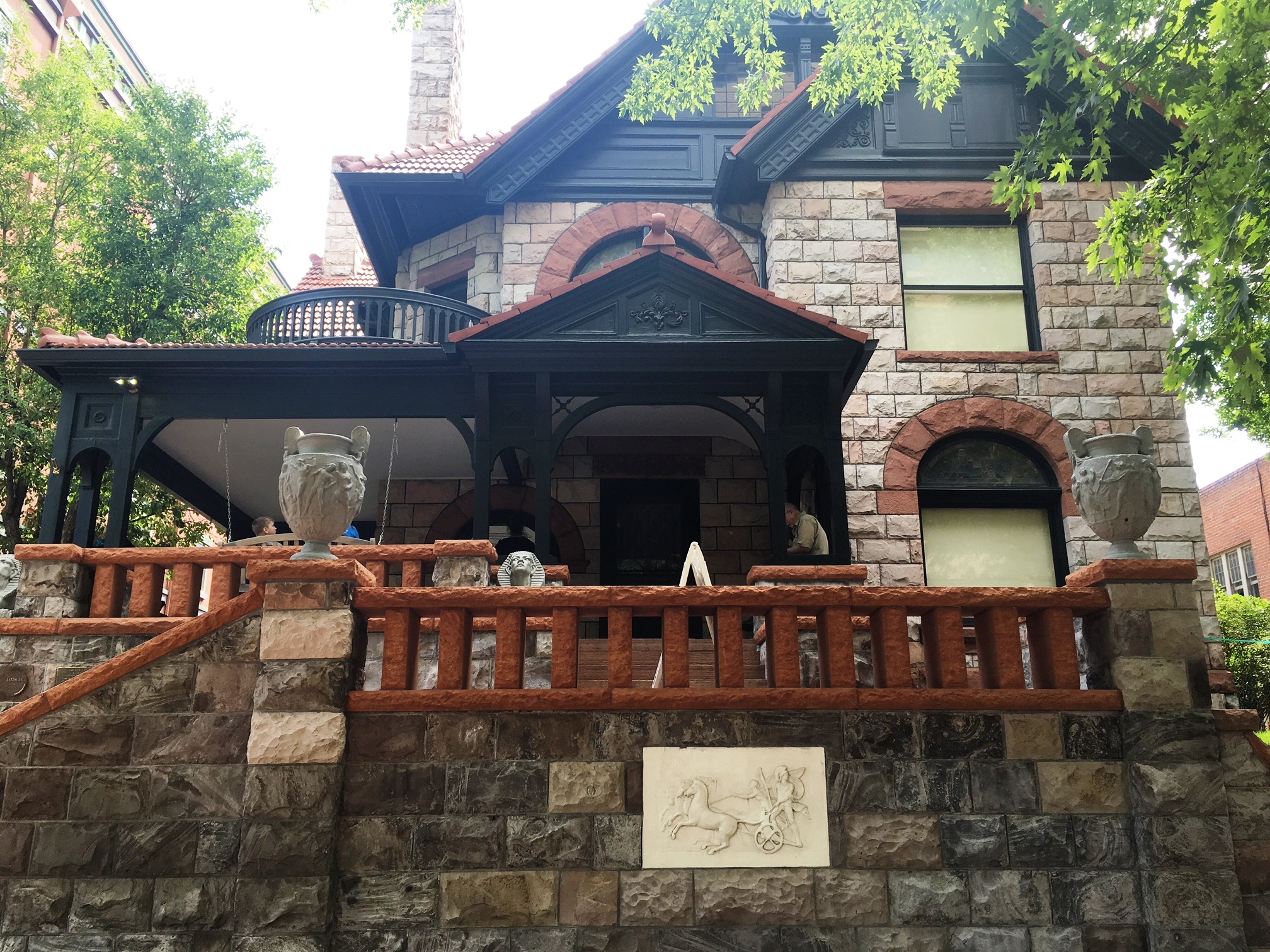
Exterior of the 1889 Home Owned by Margaret Brown - 2019

The Molly Brown House Museum (also known as House of Lions) is a house in Denver, Colorado, United States that was the home of American philanthropist, activist, and socialite Margaret Brown. She survived the sinking of the RMS Titanic and was known as the "Heroine of the Titanic" for her service to survivors. She later became known as "The Unsinkable Molly Brown". The museum is her former home and presents exhibits interpreting her life, Victorian Denver and historic preservation. The house was listed on the National Register of Historic Places in 1972. It is designated as a Denver Landmark.

== History ==
The house was designed by architect William A. Lang, and built in 1889, incorporating several popular styles of the period, including Queen Anne style architecture in the United States and Richardsonian Romanesque for the original owners Isaac and Mary Large. After the repeal of the Sherman Silver Purchase Act in 1893, the Large family sold the house. It was purchased by James Joseph Brown (J.J.), Margaret's husband, in 1894 for US$30,000 and the title was transferred to Margaret in 1898, possibly due to J.J.'s deteriorating health.

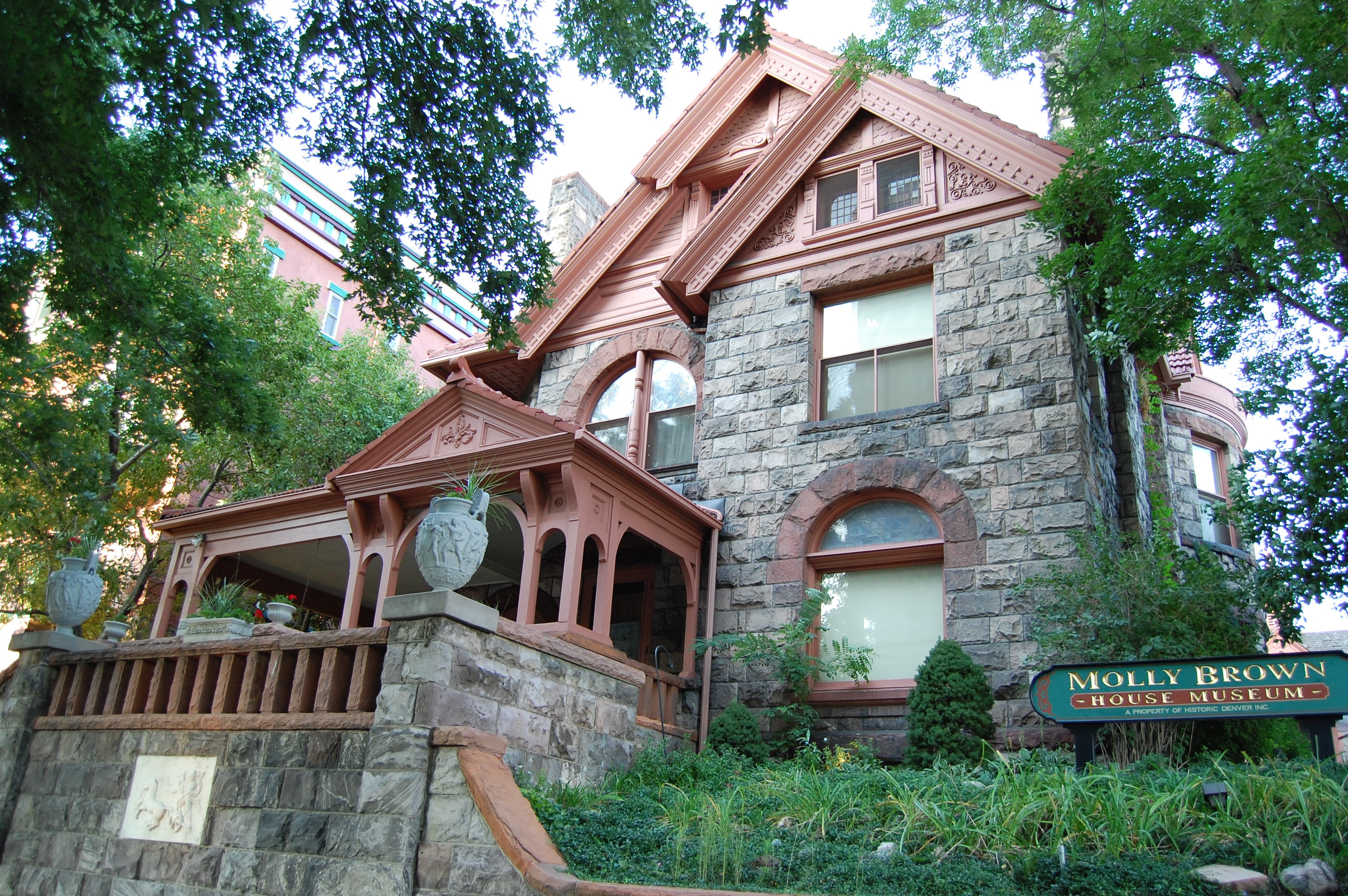
The Molly Brown House Museum

Margaret and the family traveled frequently, and so the house was often rented out. In 1902, it was the governor's mansion for the Governor of Colorado and his family (Margaret invited the governor and his family to use her home while the governor's mansion was undergoing remodeling). In 1926, Margaret turned the home into a boarding house under the supervision of her housekeeper. The house was sold after Margaret's death in 1932, for $6,000. The home then became a rooming house for men, a Jane Addams Hull House settlement, and rooms and apartments for rent.

=== Restoration and after ===
The house continued to deteriorate and by 1970 concerns arose about its impending demolition, but a group of concerned citizens formed Historic Denver, Inc., raising the funds for the house to be restored to its former state. While restoring the home, the group used architectural research, paint chip analysis, and original photographs taken in 1910 as guides. The home is owned by Historic Denver, Inc., and public tours are run daily for a fee. It has been a museum since 1971.

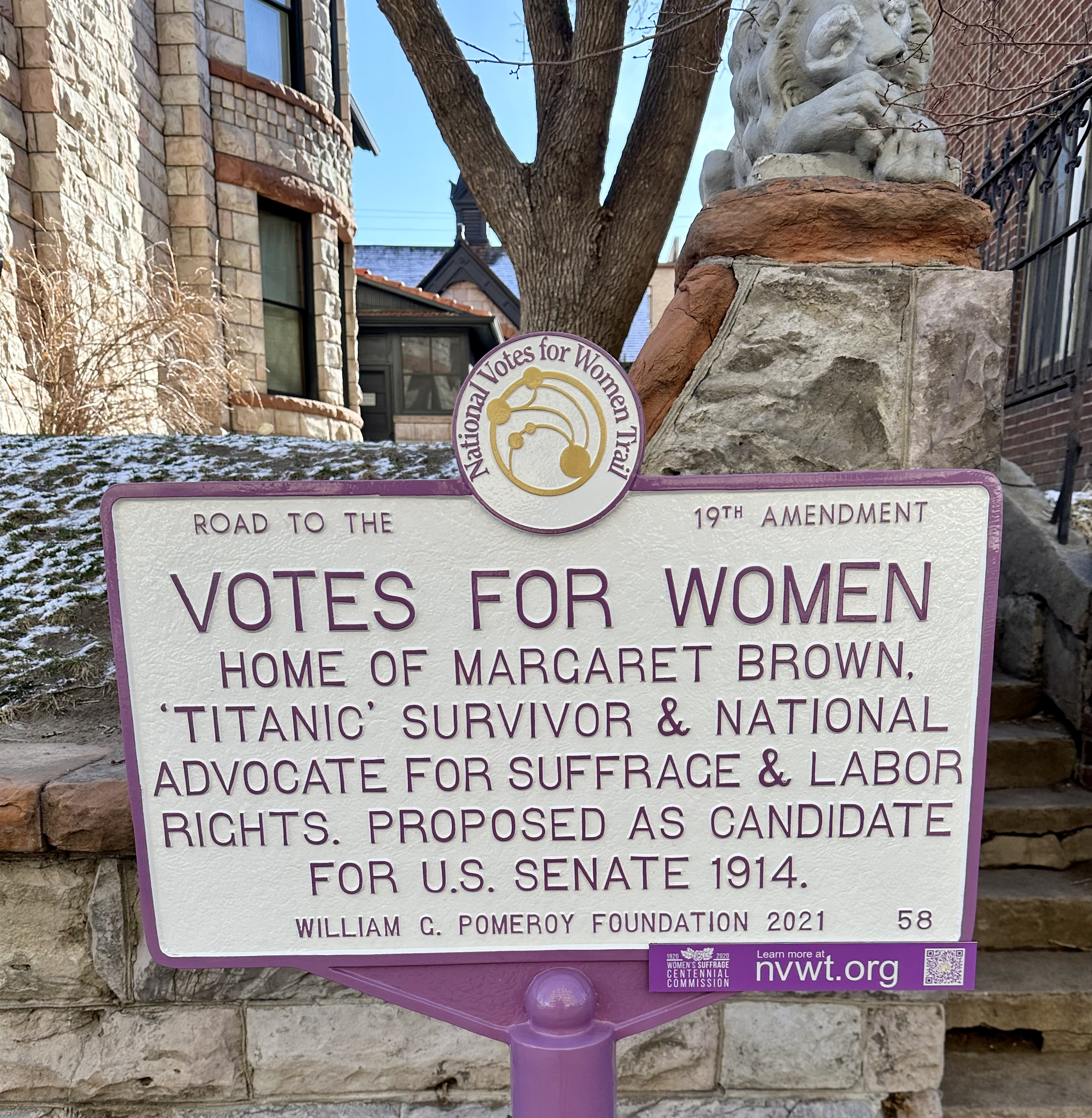
National Votes for Women Trail marker outside the Molly Brown House Museum

There is a trail marker outside the home as part of the National Votes for Women Trail; the marker was stolen in November 2023, but was found later that month.

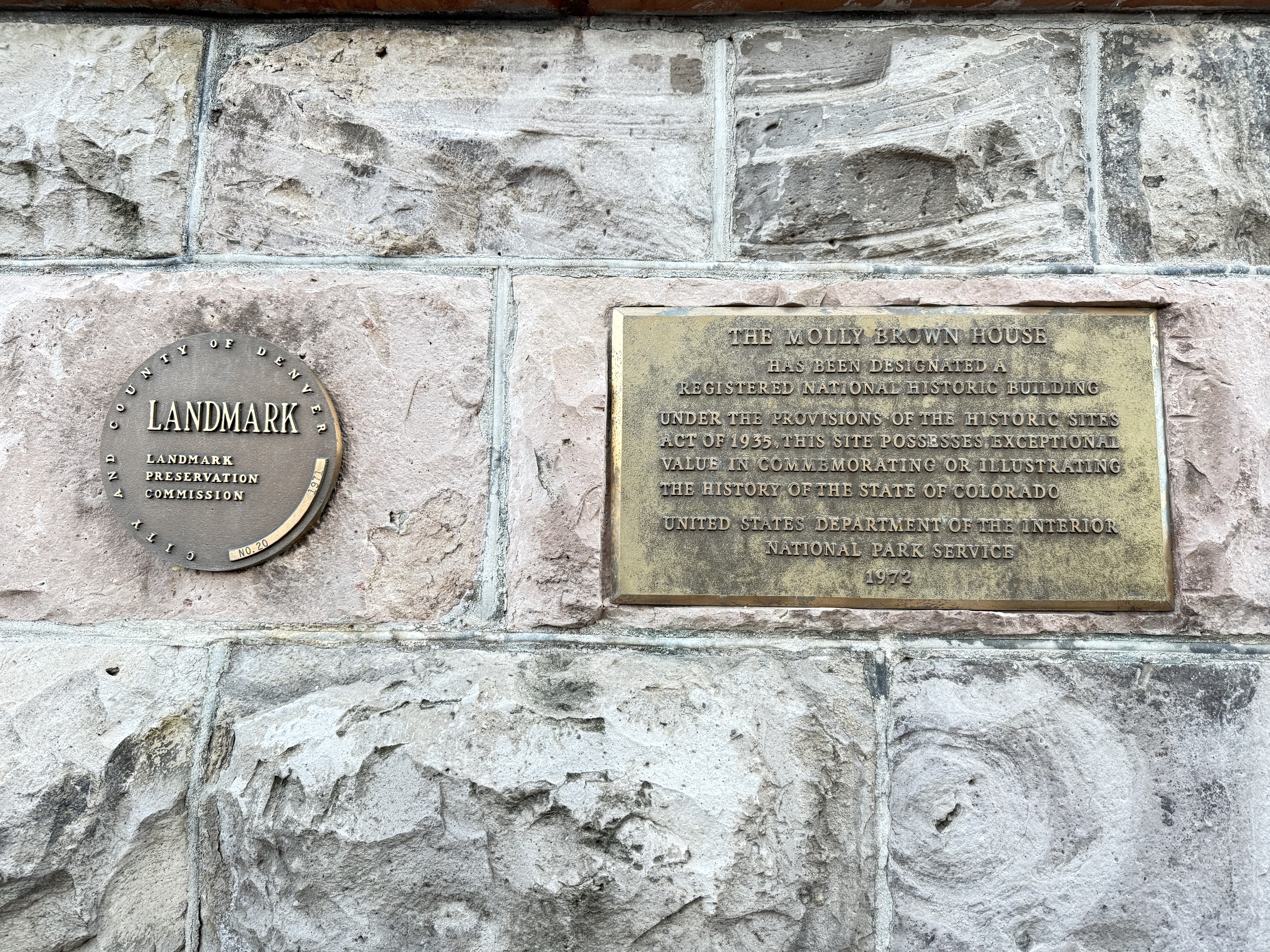
Landmark Designation Signs for The Molly Brown House, Denver, CO

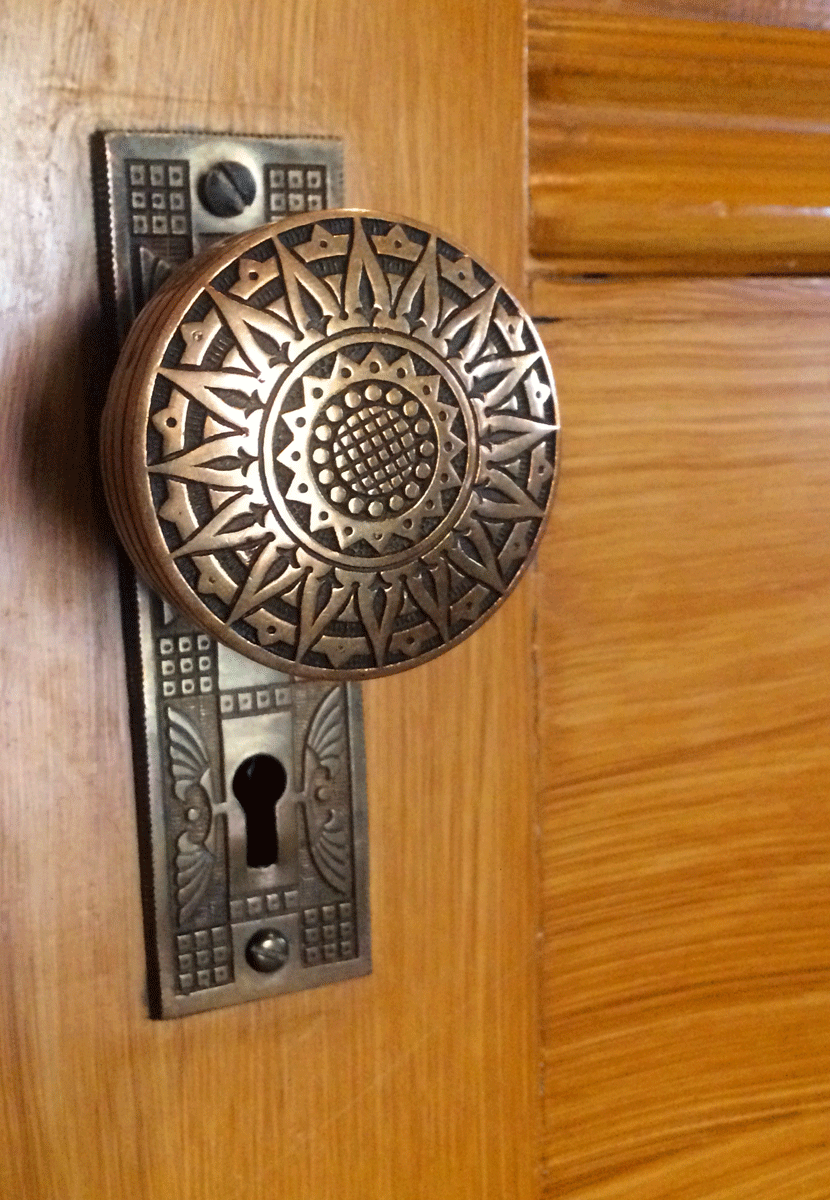
Interior doorknob

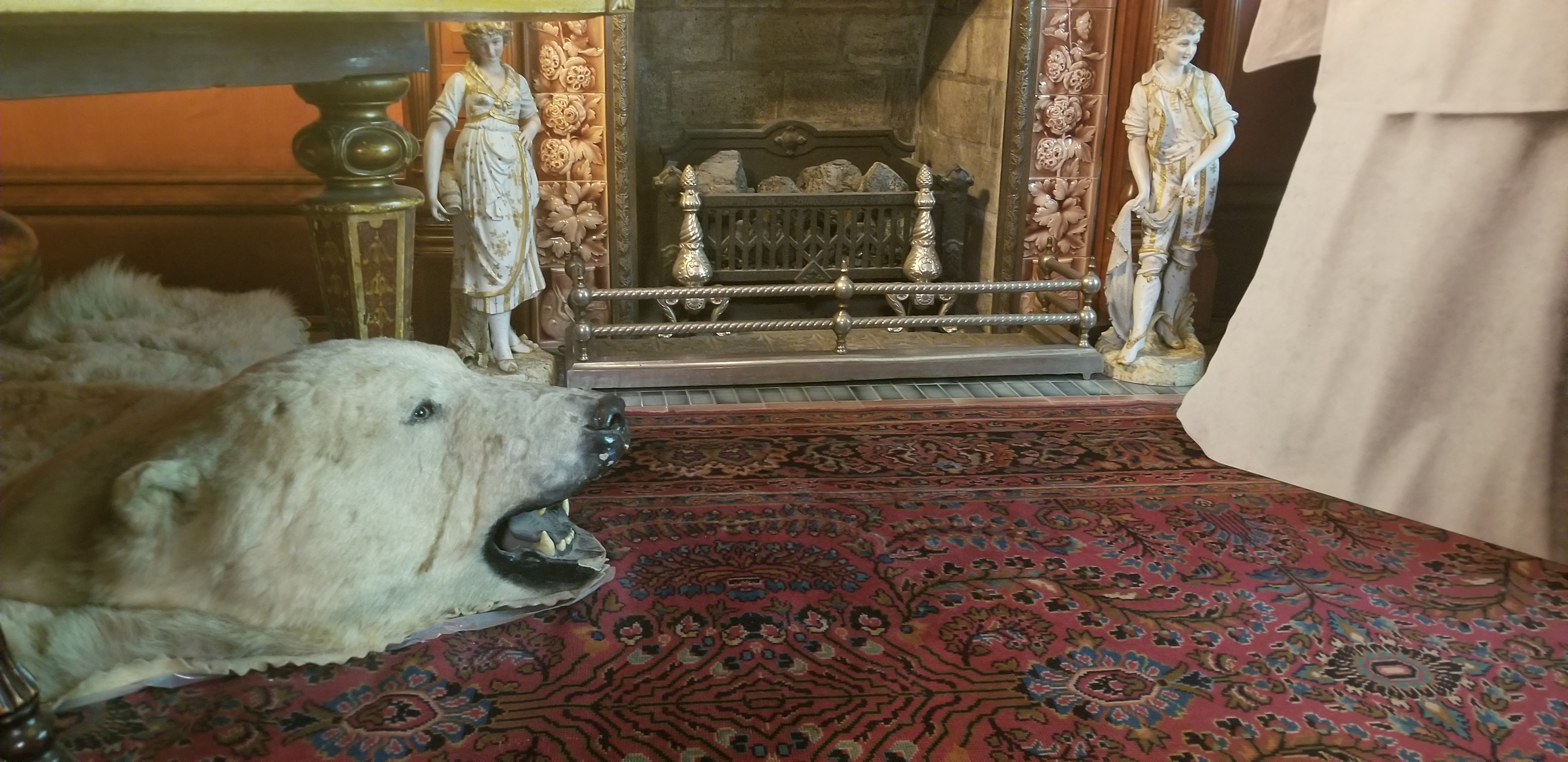
Fireplace detail

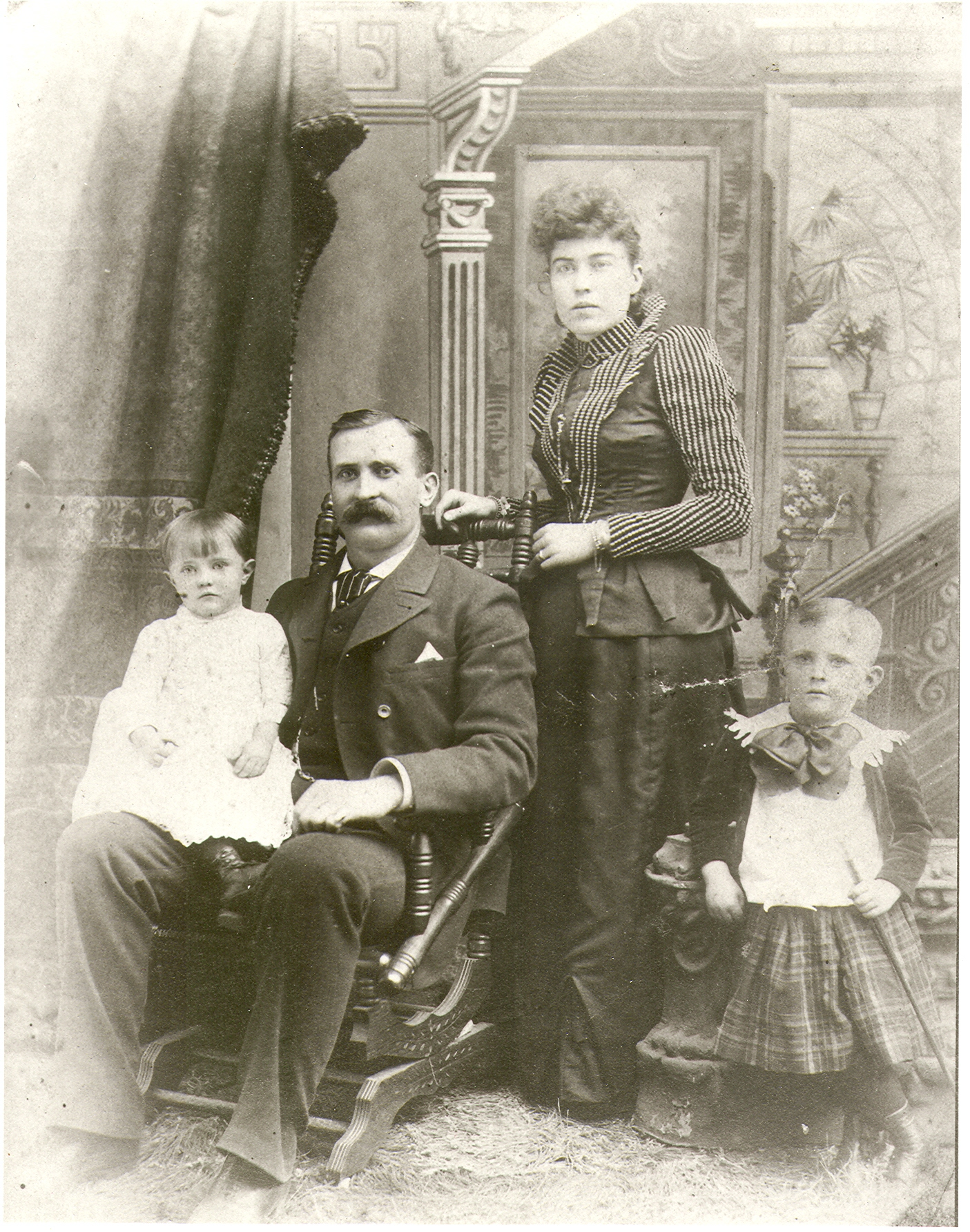
Brown Family Photo

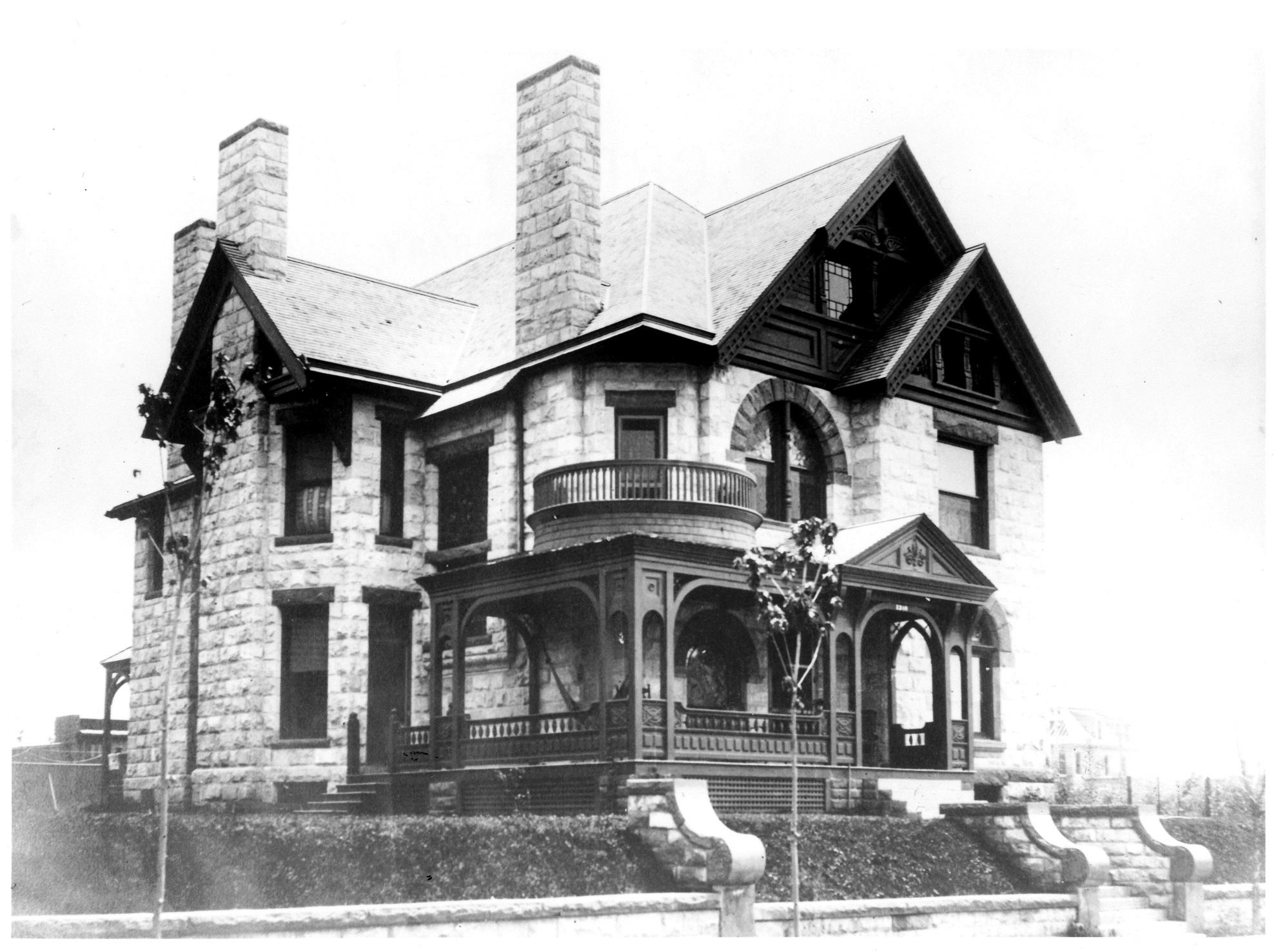
House 1889

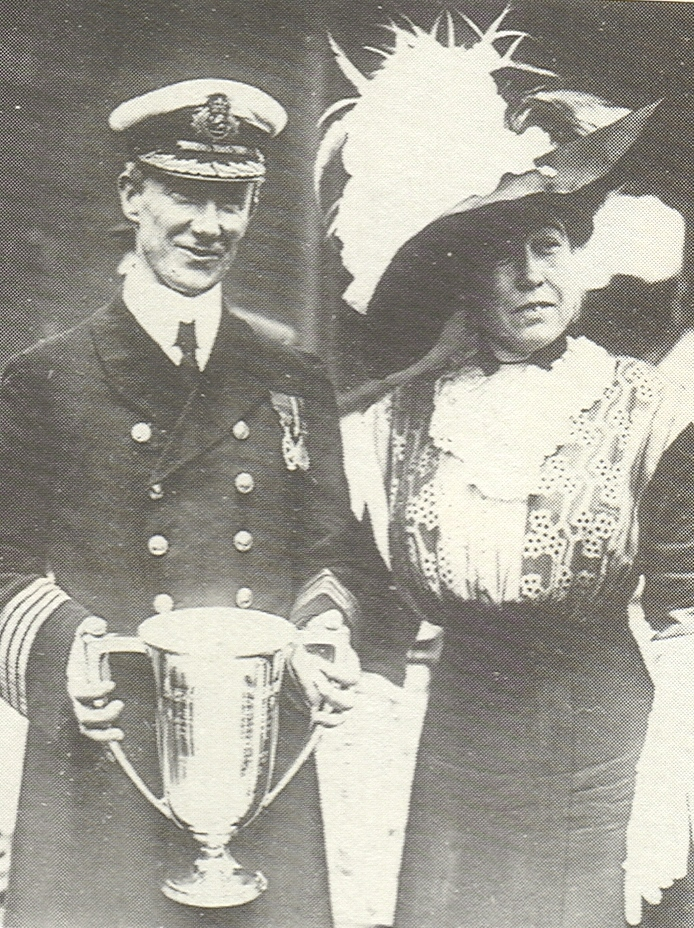
Captain Rostron and Margaret Brown with the Loving Cup

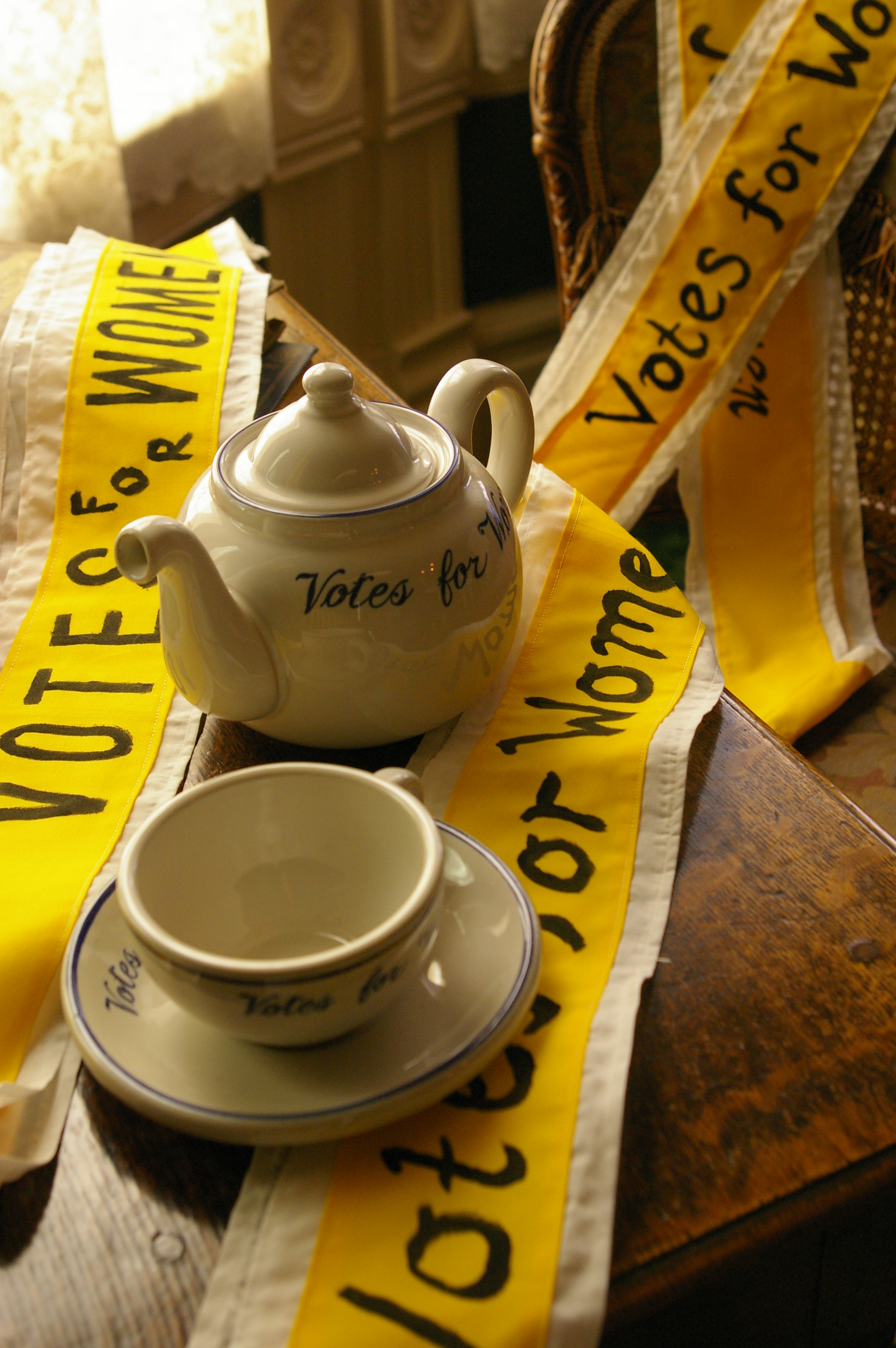
Votes for Women

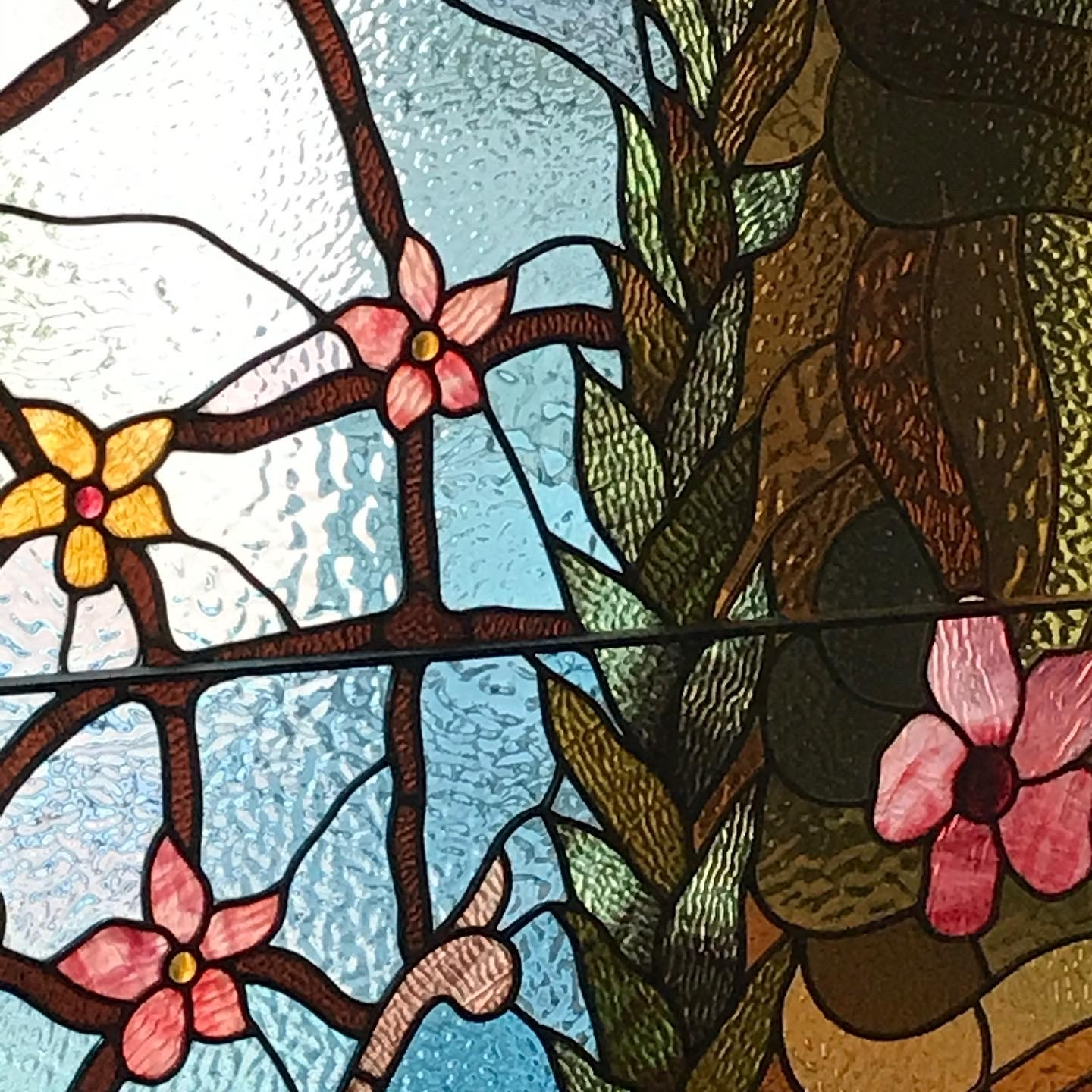
Stained Glass Detail

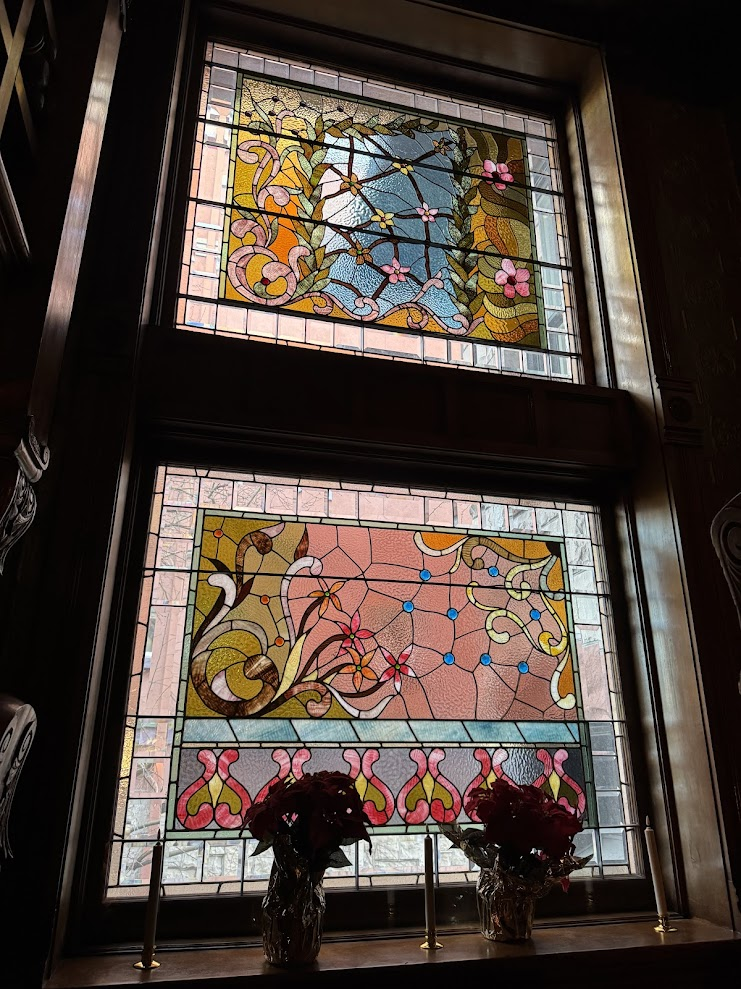
Stained Glass

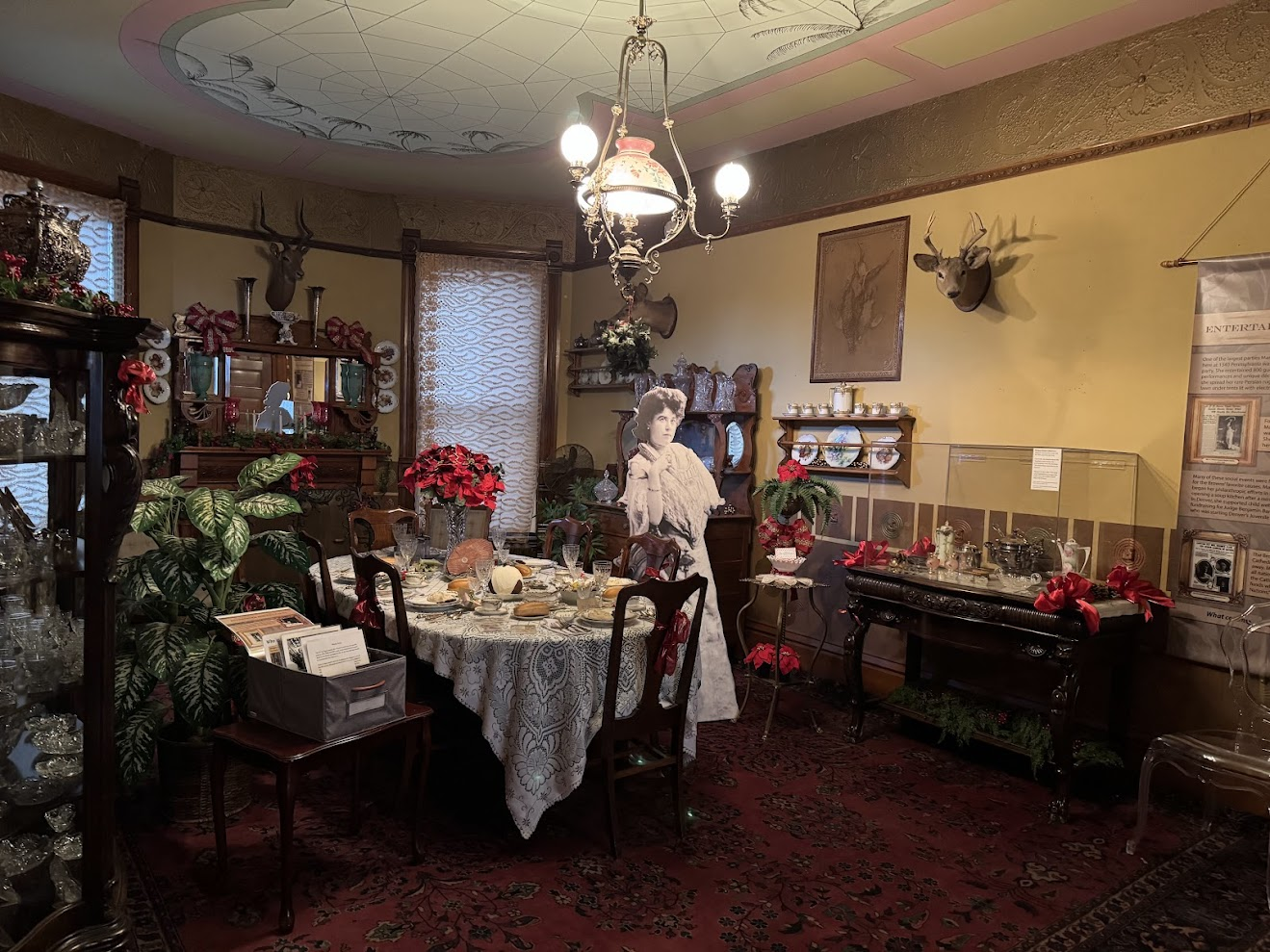
Dining Room

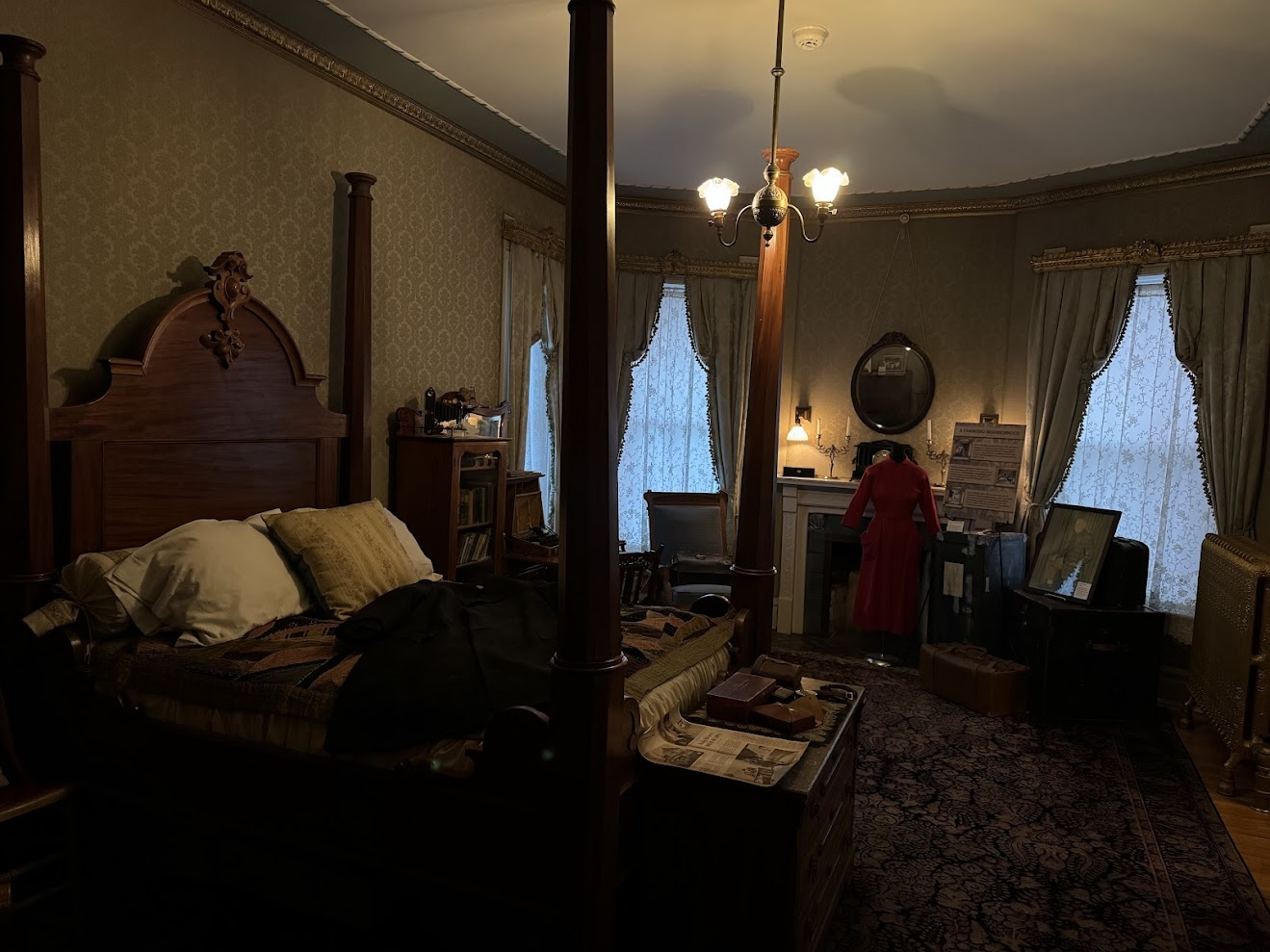
Bedroom

== See also ==
- The Molly Brown Summer House
