= Charles Boettcher =

Colorado businessman (1852–1948)

Charles Boettcher (1852 – July 1948) was a businessman in Colorado in the hardware, mining, cement and sugar beet businesses. He was one of the founders of the Ideal Cement Company. Born in Kölleda, Kingdom of Prussia, he came to the US at age 17 and worked with his brother Herman, first in Wyoming. He moved to Colorado and pursued various business projects, often partnering with John F. Campion. His family fortune has funded many philanthropic enterprises. Charles Boettcher, Sr. not to be confused with his grandson with the same name Charles Boettcher II.

Boettcher's hunting lodge, the Boettcher House (also sometimes referred to as Lorraine Lodge; National Register of Historic Places listed building #84000858, Charles Boettcher Summer Home and the Jefferson County Conference & Nature Center) was built in 1917 as a summer home and seasonal hunting lodge. It sits on 110-acres donated to Jefferson County, Colorado, in the 1970s and has been used for weddings and other public events since 1975. It was designed by Denver architect John J. Huddart.

The foundation bearing his family name has supported numerous projects in Colorado such as the Boettcher Concert Hall and the Denver Botanic Gardens. In 1963, he was inducted into the Hall of Great Westerners of the National Cowboy & Western Heritage Museum. According to this induction page, he was also a rancher.
