= The Unsinkable Molly Brown =

The Unsinkable Molly Brown may refer to:

- Margaret Brown (1867–1932), American socialite and philanthropist
- The Unsinkable Molly Brown (film), a 1964 American Metrocolor musical comedy film
- The Unsinkable Molly Brown (musical), a 1960 musical
- Gemini 3, crewed American space mission whose spacecraft was named Molly Brown after the musical
