= Eben Smith =

American businessman (1832–1906)

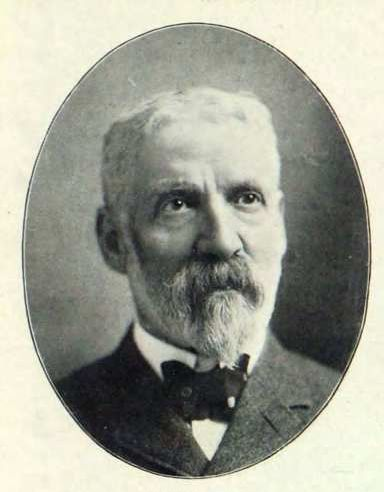
Portrait of Eben Smith

Eben Smith (December 17, 1832 – November 5, 1906) was a successful mine owner, smelting company executive, railroad executive and bank owner in Colorado in the late 19th century and early 20th century.

== Early life ==
Eben Smith was born in Erie, Pennsylvania, the son of William and Mary (Nelson) Smith, descendants of English and Scottish immigrants who immigrated to Erie County, Pennsylvania, in the latter part of the 17th century. He was educated in public and private schools in Waterford, Pennsylvania.

In 1852, Smith traveled to California, taking passage on a steamship and crossing the Isthmus of Panama before traveling up the west coast to San Francisco. He arrived in December, and spent two years engaged in placer mining in Sierra County. Shortly after his arrival in California, Smith married Caroline Jordan. The couple had two sons, Lemuel (born in 1857) and Samuel (born in 1858).

Earning a small amount of money, Smith built a hotel at French Corral in Nevada County. He sold his interest in the hotel and returned to mining. He worked in Placer County, and was subsequently hired to oversee construction of a mill near present-day Bakersfield. Smith became half-owner of the mill, which grew to become the largest milling plant in California at the time. In 1856, Smith and R.A. McClellan purchased the entire Gold Ledge property. Smith continued working the mine and operating the mill until May 1859. He sold his share to McClellan and the family returned east.

== Move to Colorado ==
The fall of 1859 proved to be a turning point in the life of Eben Smith. While visiting his brother, Dr. S.D. Smith (a prominent physician in St. Joseph, Missouri), he met Jerome B. Chaffee. The two men met a party of miners returning from Colorado who had participated in the Pike's Peak Gold Rush. The men told glowing accounts of rich gold-laden quartz veins in the region. Smith became determined to have milling machinery constructed, disassembled and hauled overland to Pikes Peak. Although Chaffee had no experience in mining or milling, he agreed to co-finance and partner with Smith in the venture. Chaffee left for Colorado in February 1860, settling in Gilpin County. Smith in Denver on May 26. Setting up business in Lake Gulch, the Smith & Chaffee mill began working lead ore.

Smith was the only man in Colorado at the time who had experience in milling quartz to extract gold. Smith soon hired himself out to various mines, and inaugurated measures for working and developing promising gold lodes in Gilpin County.

In 1863, Smith and Chaffee sold their mill. They purchased and developed the Bobtail Mine near Black Hawk; the Gregory Mine in Teller County; and other mines. They held the properties for about a year before selling to a Rhode Island mining consortium (retaining a small interest). For many years, the Bobtail remained one of the greatest gold producers in Colorado. Late in 1863, Smith's third child, Nellie, was born.

However, the move to Colorado proved to be a strain on the Smith marriage. Eben and Caroline Smith divorced in 1864. Caroline retained custody of the children and settled in Iowa.

When Chaffee established the First National Bank of Denver in 1865, Smith was a co-investor in the bank and named president.

In 1866, Smith was elected to the Colorado state legislature from Gilpin county. He served one term. That same year, he married Emily Rundel of Rochester, New York.

== Mining operations ==
Smith continued mining in Gilpin and Teller counties. Chaffee and Smith organized a group investors in 1867, purchased a mine and formed the Georgetown Silver Smelting Company. Smith invested in a large number of mines, building his wealth. Eben and Emily Smith's first child, Kate May, was born in 1867. But the child died at age thirteen months.

In 1876, he moved from Denver to Boulder, Colorado. Eben and Emily's second child, Cora Isabel, was born in 1870, followed by son Frank in 1871. (Smith's son, Lemuel, joined his father out West in 1880.)

Chaffee purchased the Caribou Mine in 1876. Once the most famous mine in Colorado, it had been sold to Dutch investors in 1873. But with the mine apparently played out and the Dutch unable to invest enough capital to discover new veins in the mine, Chaffee purchased the property with David Moffat and others. Smith was installed as manager and superintendent of the mine, positions he held until April 23, 1879. On June 25, 1880, the Caribou was consolidated with several other mines. Chaffee, Smith and others formed the Caribou Consolidated Mining Company; Smith was the companies superintendent and general manager until 1881. The Caribou claim quickly began producing large quantities of silver again, and Smith made another fortune.

In 1878, Smith used his mining profits to partner with Horace Tabor, Chaffee and Moffat in the buying and developing the Little Pittsburg Mine in Leadville. The Little Pittsburg produced vast quantities of silver and started the silver boom in Leadville. Smith was placed in charge of the mine. Additional stock in the mine was sold. But the ore suddenly petered out, and the stock price collapsed. Investors later learned that Chaffee, Moffat and the other initial owners had sold out early, reaping large profits. Accusations that the initial investors had received insider information about the mine's status were never proved.

Despite Moffat's warnings, Smith did not sell his stock in the Little Pittsburg Mine. He lost virtually his entire fortune.

In 1882, Moffat and Chaffee secured a controlling interest in the Tam O'Shanter group of mines in Pitkin County, which Smith operated and managed for a year. The group of mines did not turn out favorably, so Smith then went to Red Cliff, Colorado, and mined there for a few months. He returned to Leadville and took charge of Moffat's and Chaffee's interests in the Maid of Erin, Henrietta and Louisville mines. He operated those mines for 10 years, rebuilding his fortune and eventually purchasing a financial interest in all of them.

1891 saw the first of hundreds of gold and silver strikes in the Cripple Creek region of Colorado. Smith quickly became invested in a number of mining operations there, including the Anaconda Mine and the Victor Gold Mining Company (later, after numerous mine consolidations, reincorporated as the Battle Mountain Consolidated Gold Mining Company). In 1892, the owners of the Portland Mine bought out Smith's interest in Battle Mountain as part of their successful attempt to consolidate gold mining on Battle Mountain. Smith used the money to buy an interest later that year in the Ibex Mining Company, the owner of the famous Little Jonny Mine in Leadville. (Among the owners of Ibex Mining was James Joseph Brown, husband of 'Unsinkable' Molly Brown.)

In 1893, Smith moved back to Denver.

=== Railroad building ===
As growth continued in the Cripple Creek area, Smith, Moffat and two other investors began building the Florence and Cripple Creek Railroad (F&CC) in 1893. Moffat, president of the Denver and Rio Grande Railroad, saw the chance to expand his business as well as skim profits off the lucrative Cripple Creek mining operations. The owners decided to build a railroad from Florence to Cripple Creek to ship ore to the mills in Florence.

The Florence and Cripple Creek Railroad was incorporated on April 17, 1893. Smith was an officer in the company. The railroad the Free Road (a private road which had been recently constructed from Florence through Victor to Cripple Creek), and construction began on January 1, 1894. The first ore train rolled on over the 'Gold Belt Line' (as the railroad was nicknamed) on May 27, 1894; the first passenger train began service on July 1, 1894. (Operation of the railroad ceased when the company liquidated itself in January 1913. The track was torn up in 1914.)

=== Cripple Creek miners' strike of 1894 ===
Smith was one of three mine owners to precipitate the Cripple Creek miners' strike of 1894. The mine owners, who employed about a third of the miners in the area, extended the work-day to 10 hours while refusing to increase pay. The workers, represented by the Western Federation of Miners, struck. Although some smaller mining companies capitulated immediately, the remaining owners (including Smith) raised a paramilitary force under the legal protection of the local sheriff. After a tense and somewhat violent standoff, the governor sent in the state militia to protect the miners. Smith and the other mine owners agreed to return to the eight-hour day. It was a major victory for the union.

=== Leadville miners' strike of 1896-97 ===
Prior to the Leadville Colorado, Miners' Strike, Eben Smith wrote in a letter to an associate, "we will have to close all of our properties as we have not made a dollar in two years." However, historian William Philpott has written that Smith "almost certainly exaggerated." Leadville's mining industry had "recovered impressively" from the downturn of 1893.

The Mine Owners' Association in Leadville conducted a lockout of mineworkers during the strike. Smith instructed an associate to close the mines "unless lightning strikes and kills off all the Irish," an acknowledgment that the Cloud City Miners' Union, Local 33 of the Western Federation of Miners, was largely controlled by Irish miners.

After violence at the Coronado and Emmet Mines in Leadville killed four strikers and one fireman, Smith wrote to a London business contact, "The strikers got the worst of it in the raid on the Coronado and Emmet, there were 10 or 12 killed; we do not know how many, and a great number wounded; they take care of their wounded the same as the Indians but every now and then a fellow turns up that the rats have been eating or who has gone to decay that we know must have been shot..." Philpott concluded the remarks suggest "that Smith looked on the miners as almost subhuman. Certainly there is no hint of empathy in these words."

== Last years in mining ==
After the Cripple Creek strike, Eben Smith slowly began to pull his investments out mines. Returning to his interest in milling, he built a cyanide process mill near Florence in 1895. It was the largest cyanide process gold mill of its kind in the world at the time. Smith continued to extend the F&CC railroad, and built an electric power plant at Goldfield. But Smith sold most of his investments, including interest in his many mines, throughout the 1890s. He re-invested some of the money in mines in Utah, Arizona and Oregon.

In 1896, Smith formed the Mine and Smelter Supply Company with his son, Frank, and brothers John S. and Robert J. Cary. Smith had been concerned that ore deposits in the Cripple Creek area were running out, and Smith cast about for a way to keep the towns of the region alive. He realized that much of the slag in the area had been poor milled, and still contained a large amount of gold and silver ore. The Mine and Smelter Supply Company was founded in order to improve ore recovery rates and save the towns. With Eben Smith as president, the company established branches in Denver, Salt Lake City, El Paso, Texas, and Mexico City. It quickly became the world's largest supplier of ore recovery equipment.

== Retirement and final years ==
Beginning in early 1903, the Western Federation of Miners conducted strikes against refining companies, which eventually spread to the Cripple Creek mining district. In 1904, Joseph Seep bought out Eben Smith's portion of the Mine and Smelter Supply Company. By 1905, he had purchased the remaining shares of Frank Smith and the Cary brothers as well.

In October 1901, Eben Smith returned to California and turned to retirement living in Los Angeles. He split his time between this home and a summer residence in Palmer Lake, Colorado.

But Smith could not keep from dabbling in business ventures. He made large, ill-advised investments in Los Angeles' Murray M. Harris Organ Company (builder of the St. Louis Exposition Organ, now the Wanamaker Organ) and in the Pacific Wireless Telegraph Company. Mismanagement at both companies forced Smith to take over operation of the companies in order to salvage his investments. Under Smith's direction the Murray M. Harris Co. became the Los Angeles Art Organ Co. and soon after the Electrolian Organ Co. when it moved to Hoboken, N.J. Electrolian aimed to take some of the market share of the lucrative residence-organ business from the Aeolian Company, the industry leader. As a builder of extra-quality art organs, it was faced with patent-infringement lawsuits and it never attracted significant business, and concurrent with Smith's death, the venture was dissolved.

Smith died in Denver of acute peritonitis stemming from appendicitis on November 5, 1906, before he could finish reorganizing the companies. His papers are preserved at the Denver Public Library.

Smith's wealth was estimated between $3 million and $10 million at his death, but may have been a good deal less. His mausoleum is in Fairmount Cemetery in Denver. Some of his mansions, including Estemere in the Colorado Rockies, survive him.
