= Avoca Lodge =

Historic house in Colorado, United States

- U.S. National Register of Historic Places
- Colorado State Register of Historic Properties
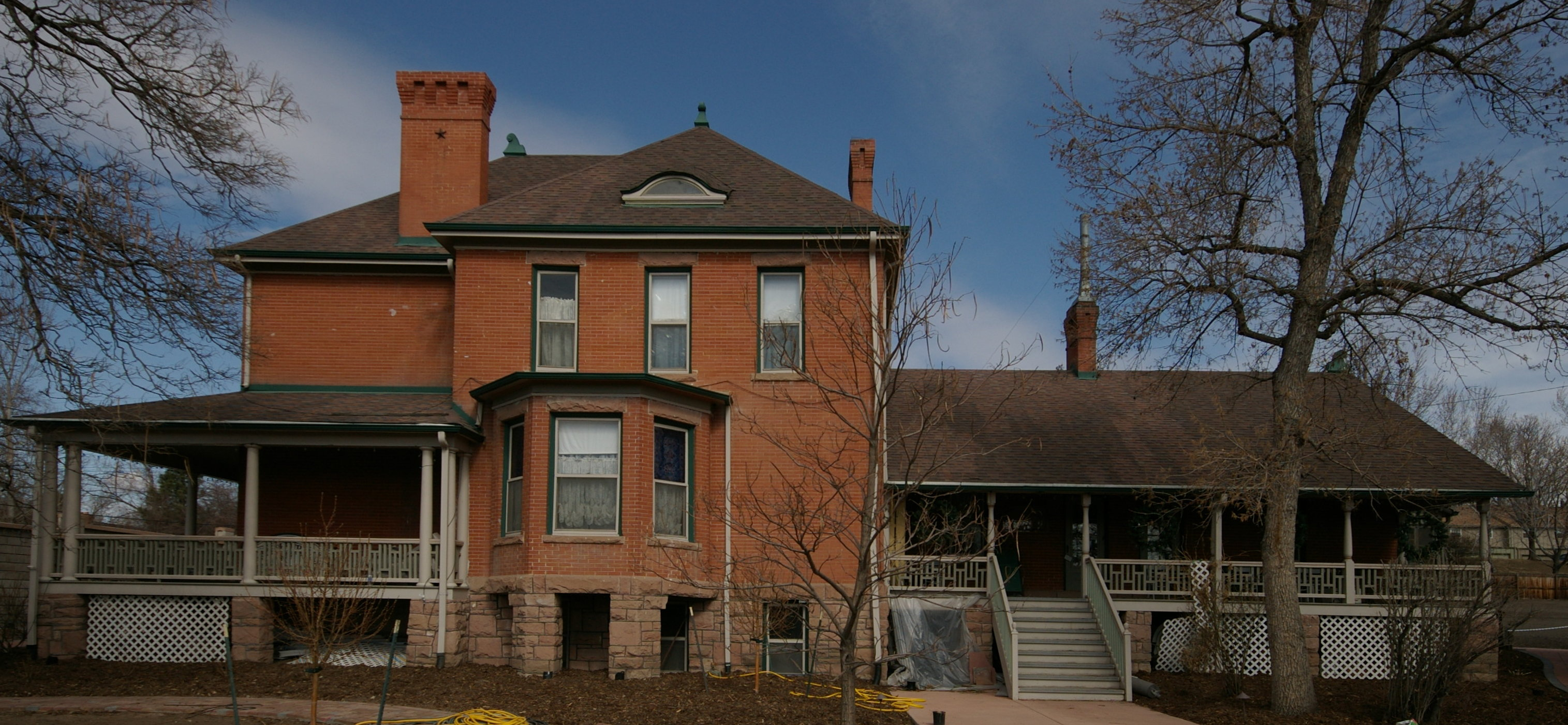

- Location within Colorado Location within the United States
- Location: 2690 S. Wadsworth Blvd., Denver, Colorado
- Coordinates: 39°40′5″N 105°4′50″W
- Built: 1897
- Architectural style: Foursquare
- NRHP reference No.: 89002373
- CSRHP No.: 5DV.696
- Added to NRHP: January 26, 1990

Avoca Lodge, known as The Molly Brown Summer House, is located in southwest Denver, Colorado near Bear Creek. The home served as a summer retreat for philanthropist, socialite, and activist Margaret Brown and her husband James Joseph Brown. Brown was known as "The Unsinkable Molly Brown" because she survived the sinking of the RMS Titanic. The house is open to the public for rental and tours. It has been listed on the National Register of Historic Places since January 26, 1990.
