= Margaret Brown =

American Titanic survivor (1867–1932)

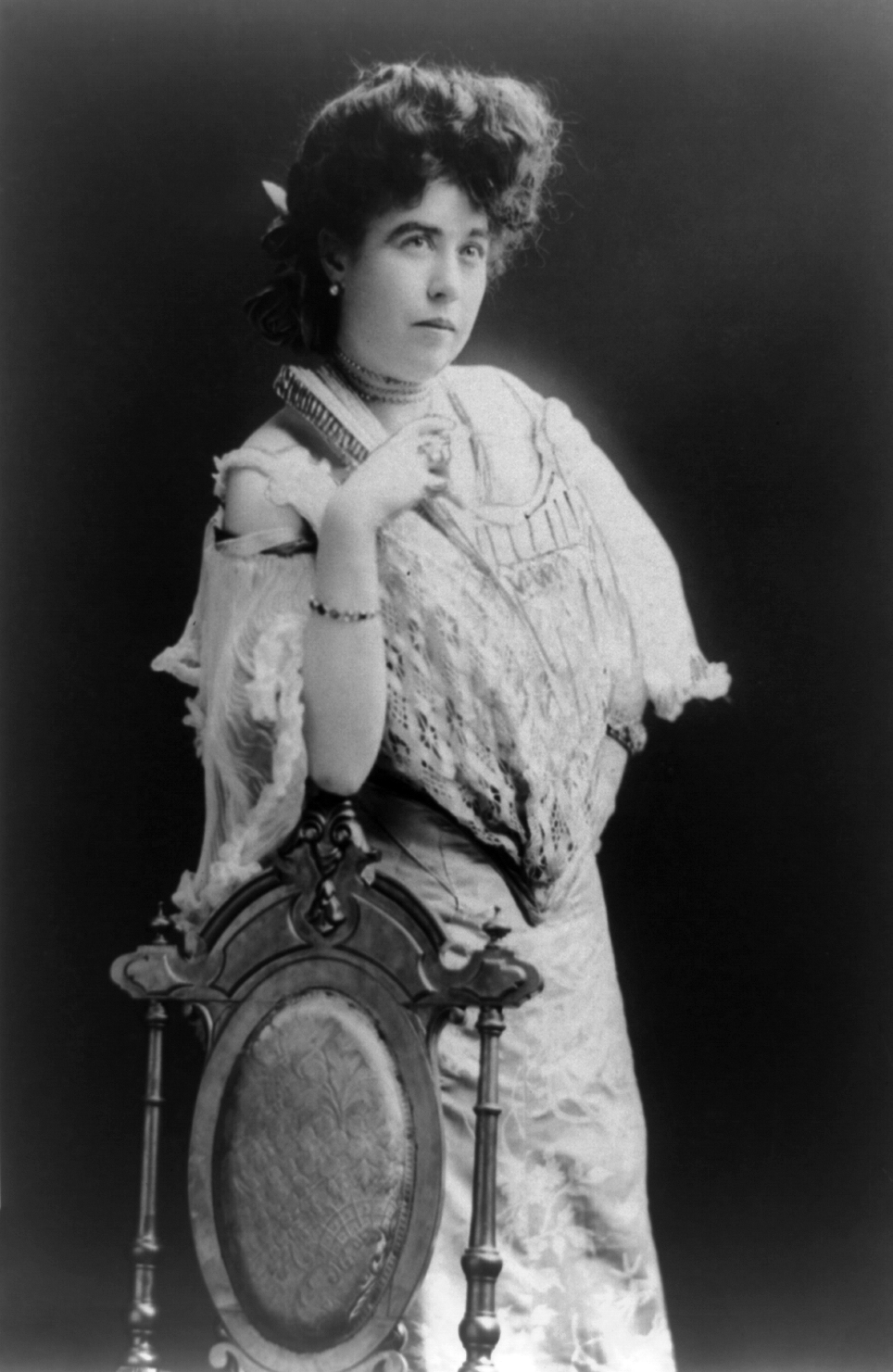
- Brown c. 1910s
- Born: Margaret Tobin; July 18, 1867; Hannibal, Missouri, U.S.
- Died: October 26, 1932 (aged 65); New York City, U.S.
- Resting place: Cemetery of the Holy Rood, Westbury, New York, U.S.
- Other names: Margaret Tobin Brown, Maggie Brown, Molly Brown, Mrs. James J. Brown
- Occupations: Volunteer, philanthropist, and suffragist
- Known for: Survivor of the Titanic sinking
- Spouse: James Joseph Brown (m. 1886; sep. 1909)
- Children: 2

Margaret Brown (née Tobin; July 18, 1867 – October 26, 1932), posthumously known as the "Unsinkable Molly Brown", was an American socialite and philanthropist. She was a survivor of the RMS Titanic, which sank in 1912, and she unsuccessfully urged the crew in Lifeboat No. 6 to return to the debris field to look for survivors.

During her lifetime, her friends called her "Maggie", but by her death, obituaries referred to her as the "Unsinkable Mrs. Brown". Gene Fowler referred to her as "Molly Brown" in his 1933 book Timber Line. The following year, she was referred to as the "Unsinkable Mrs. Brown" and "Molly Brown" in newspapers.

The 1960 Broadway musical The Unsinkable Molly Brown with music and lyrics by Meredith Willson and book by Richard Morris is a fictionalized account of the life of Brown. The musical was subsequently made into the 1964 film of the same name starring Debbie Reynolds. Brown has been portrayed on television and in film by Thelma Ritter, Cloris Leachman, Marilu Henner, and Kathy Bates.

== Early life ==
Margaret Tobin was born on July 18, 1867, near the Mississippi River in Hannibal, Missouri, on Denkler's Alley. (Note: The street was also known as Denkler Alley and Denklers Alley.) The three-room cottage where she was born is now the Molly Brown Birthplace and Museum; stood at 600 Butler Street in Hannibal until 2024 when it was moved due to foundation issues and water damage. The house now sits at 400 N. Main Street in Hannibal Missouri. Her parents were Irish Catholic immigrants John Tobin and Johanna (Collins) Tobin. (Note: Her father, John Tobin, was said to be an abolitionist who supported the Underground Railroad. According to Kelli Atter, director of the Molly Brown House Museum, "the [Tobin] children grew up believing it was their civic duty to help Irish Catholics and African Americans, both highly marginalized groups at the time". According to the Molly Brown House Museum and the Molly Brown from Hannibal book, John Tobin was believed by family lore to be an abolitionist in Virginia and Underground Railroad supporter. Irish immigrants were often supporters of the Underground Railroad in Virginia, which was a slave state. By 1860, Tobin lived in Hannibal, Missouri, which was a major "gateway to freedom" on the Underground Railroad. John Tobin served in the Union militia in Missouri, which was a slave state.) Her siblings were Daniel Tobin, Michael Tobin, William Tobin, and Helen Tobin. Both of Margaret's parents had previously been married to other spouses who had died. Brown had two half-sisters: Catherine Bridget Tobin, by her father's first marriage, and Mary Ann Collins, by her mother's first marriage. Called Maggie by her family, she attended her maternal aunt Mary O'Leary's grammar school, which was across the street from her home. Nearby was also the Hannibal Gas Works where her father worked as a laborer. Their neighborhood was a tight-knit Irish Catholic community, where people traveled westward through the town for the gold fields.

At age 18, Margaret relocated to Leadville, Colorado, with her siblings Daniel Tobin, Mary Ann Collins Landrigan, and Mary Ann's husband John Landrigan. Margaret and her brother Daniel shared a two-room log cabin, and she found work sewing carpets and draperies at a dry goods store, Daniels, Fisher and Smith. Daniel was a miner.

== Marriage and children ==
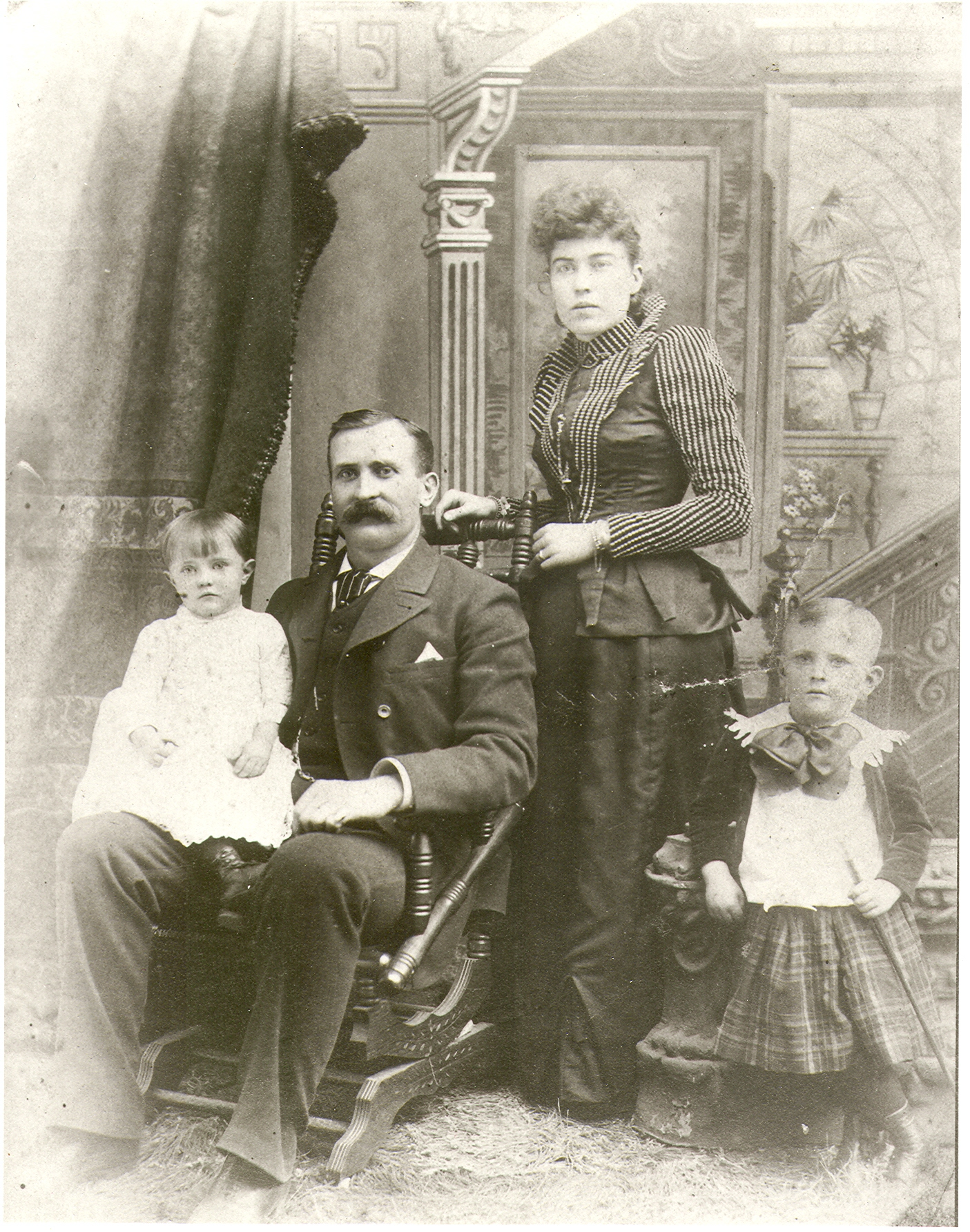
James Joseph (J.J.), Margaret (Maggie), and their children Lawrence Palmer (Larry) and Catherine Ellen (Helen) Brown, in Leadville, Colorado

In Leadville, she met and married James Joseph Brown (1854–1922), nicknamed "J.J.", an imaginative, self-educated man. He was not a rich man, and she married J.J. for love. After his death she said:

I wanted a rich man, but I loved Jim Brown. I thought about how I wanted comfort for my father and how I had determined to stay single until a man presented himself who could give to the tired older man the things I longed for him. Jim was as poor as we were and had no better chance. I struggled hard with myself in those days. I loved Jim, but he was poor. Finally, I decided that I'd be better off with a poor man whom I loved than with a wealthy one whose money had attracted me. So I married Jim Brown.

Margaret and J.J. married in Leadville Annunciation Church on September 1, 1886. They had two children: Lawrence Palmer Brown (1887–1949), known as Larry, and Catherine Ellen Brown (1889–1969), known as Helen. They also raised three of their nieces: Grace, Florence, and Helen Tobin.

== Mining success ==
In 1893, the Brown family acquired great wealth when J.J.'s mining engineering efforts proved instrumental in the exploration of a substantial ore seam at the Little Jonny Mine. His employer, Ibex Mining Company, awarded him 12,500 shares of stock and a seat on the board. In Leadville, Margaret helped by working in soup kitchens to assist miners' families.

In 1894, the Browns bought a Victorian mansion, now known as the Molly Brown House, in Denver for US$30,000 (equivalent to $1,116,000 in 2025). In 1897, they built a summer house, Avoca Lodge, in Southwest Denver near Bear Creek, which gave the family more social opportunities. Margaret became a charter member of the Denver Women's Club, whose mission was the improvement of women's lives by continuing education and philanthropy. Adjusting to the trappings of a society lady, Brown became immersed in the arts and fluent in French, German, Italian, and Russian. Brown co-founded a branch in Denver of the Alliance Française to promote her love of French culture. She lobbied for women's right to vote. (Note: Brown gave parties that were attended by Denver socialites, but it has been said that she was unable to gain entry into the most elite group, Sacred 36, who attended exclusive bridge parties and dinners held by Louise Sneed Hill. She was rejected primarily because she was Roman Catholic and Irish. After surviving the sinking of the RMS Titanic, however, she was invited to lunches by socialites.)

J.J. was not interested in the social life that Brown enjoyed and the couple began to drift apart. After 23 years of marriage, Margaret and J.J. privately signed a separation agreement in 1909. She received a US$700 monthly allowance (equivalent to $25,000 in 2025) to continue her travels and political work. Brown assisted in fundraising for Denver's Cathedral of the Immaculate Conception, which was completed in 1911. She also worked with Judge Ben Lindsey to help destitute children and establish one of the United States' first juvenile courts.

== Passenger on the Titanic ==
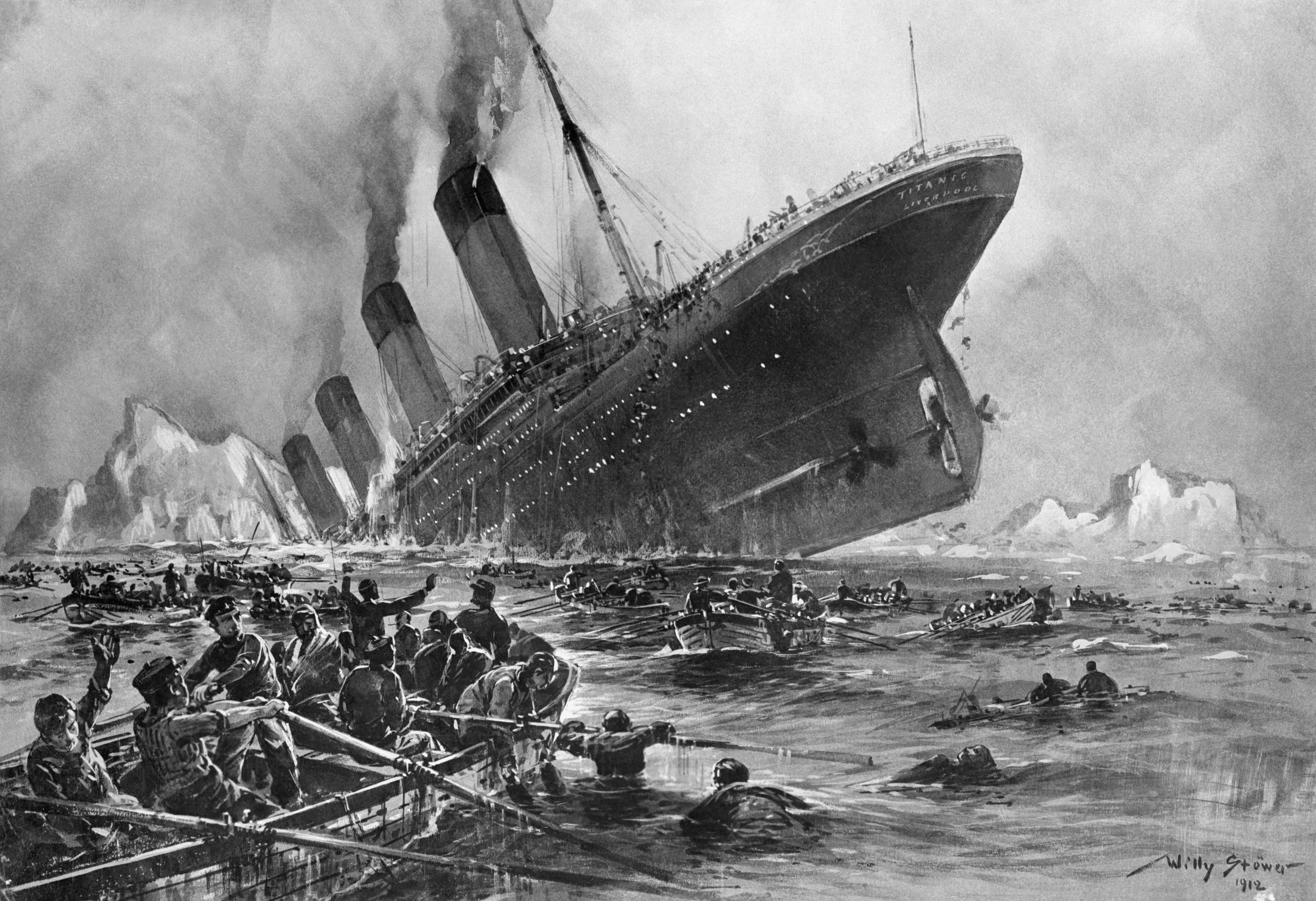
Sinking of the RMS Titanic, by Willy Stöwer, 1912

Brown spent the first months of 1912 in Paris visiting her daughter and as part of the John Jacob Astor IV party, until she received word from Denver that her eldest grandchild, Lawrence Palmer Brown Jr., was ill. She immediately booked passage on the first available liner leaving for New York, the RMS Titanic. Originally, her daughter Helen was supposed to accompany her, but Helen, who had studied at the Sorbonne in Paris, decided to take a side trip to London with friends. Brown boarded the Titanic as a first-class passenger on the evening of April 10, conveyed aboard the tender SS Nomadic at Cherbourg, France, en route to New York City.

After striking an iceberg at around 11:40 p.m. the previous night, the Titanic sank early on April 15, 1912, at around 2:20 a.m.. Brown left the ship in lifeboat No. 6, the second boat to leave from the port side. Around 1,514 people aboard RMS Titanic perished; there were a total of 2,224 people on the ship. After her death in 1932, Brown was called "Molly Brown" and "The Unsinkable Mrs. Brown." Along with other women, she took an oar herself in her lifeboat and urged the lifeboat crew to go back and save more passengers. Her urgings were met with opposition from Quartermaster Robert Hichens, the crewman in charge of lifeboat 6. Hichens was fearful that if they were to go back, the lifeboat would either be pulled down due to suction, or those in the water would swamp the boat in an effort to get in. As a result, Brown and the other passengers did not succeed in convincing him to return.

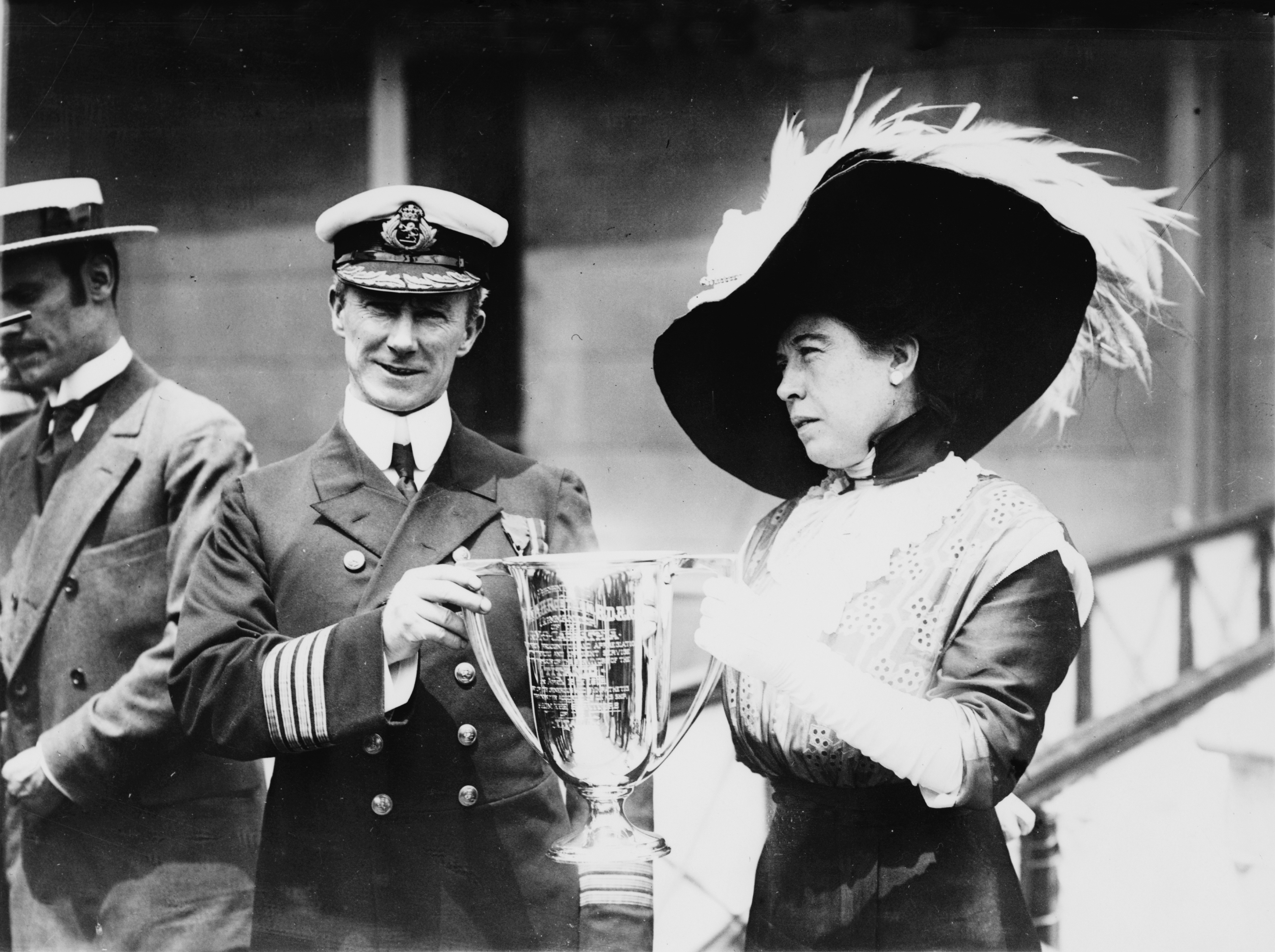
Brown presenting Carpathia Captain Arthur Henry Rostron with an award for his service in the rescue of survivors of the Titanic

Upon being rescued by the ship RMS Carpathia, along with a number of other first-class survivors, Brown organized a committee with other first-class which worked to secure basic necessities for the second- and third-class survivors, and even provided informal counseling. The committee also later awarded the crew of Carpathia for their rescue of the survivors of the sinking.

== Later life and death ==
In 1914, six years before the Nineteenth Amendment granted women the right to vote, Brown ran for Colorado's U.S. Senate seat, but she ended her campaign to serve abroad as the director of the American Committee for Devastated France during World War I. Also in 1914, she contributed to miners and their families after the 1914 Ludlow Massacre, and she helped organize the International Women's Rights conference that year, which was held in Newport, Rhode Island.

During and after World War I, she worked in France with the Red Cross and later with the American Committee for Devastated France to help wounded French and American soldiers and rebuild areas behind the front line. For her work organizing female ambulance drivers, nurses, and food distributors, Brown was awarded the French Legion of Honor in 1932.

J.J. Brown died on September 5, 1922. Margaret told newspapers that although she had met royalty and other great people around the world, "I've never met a finer, bigger, more worthwhile man than J.J. Brown." J.J. Brown left vast, yet complicated, real estate, mining, and stock holdings. It was unknown to the Browns and their lawyers how much was left in the estate. Prior to J.J.'s death, he had transferred a large amount of money to his children. Their children were also unaware of how much money Margaret had, but were displeased at the large amounts she spent on charity. Margaret Brown and her children fought in court for six years to settle the estate.

In the 1920s, Margaret Brown focused her energy on personal passions, especially the theater. She died in her sleep at 10:55 p.m. on October 26, 1932, at age 65, in New York City's Barbizon Hotel. Subsequent autopsy revealed a brain tumor. She was buried next to J.J. at St. Brigid's cemetery, now known as Cemetery of the Holy Rood, in Westbury, New York, following a small ceremony on October 31, 1932, attended by close friends and family. There was singing, but no eulogy.

== Legacy ==
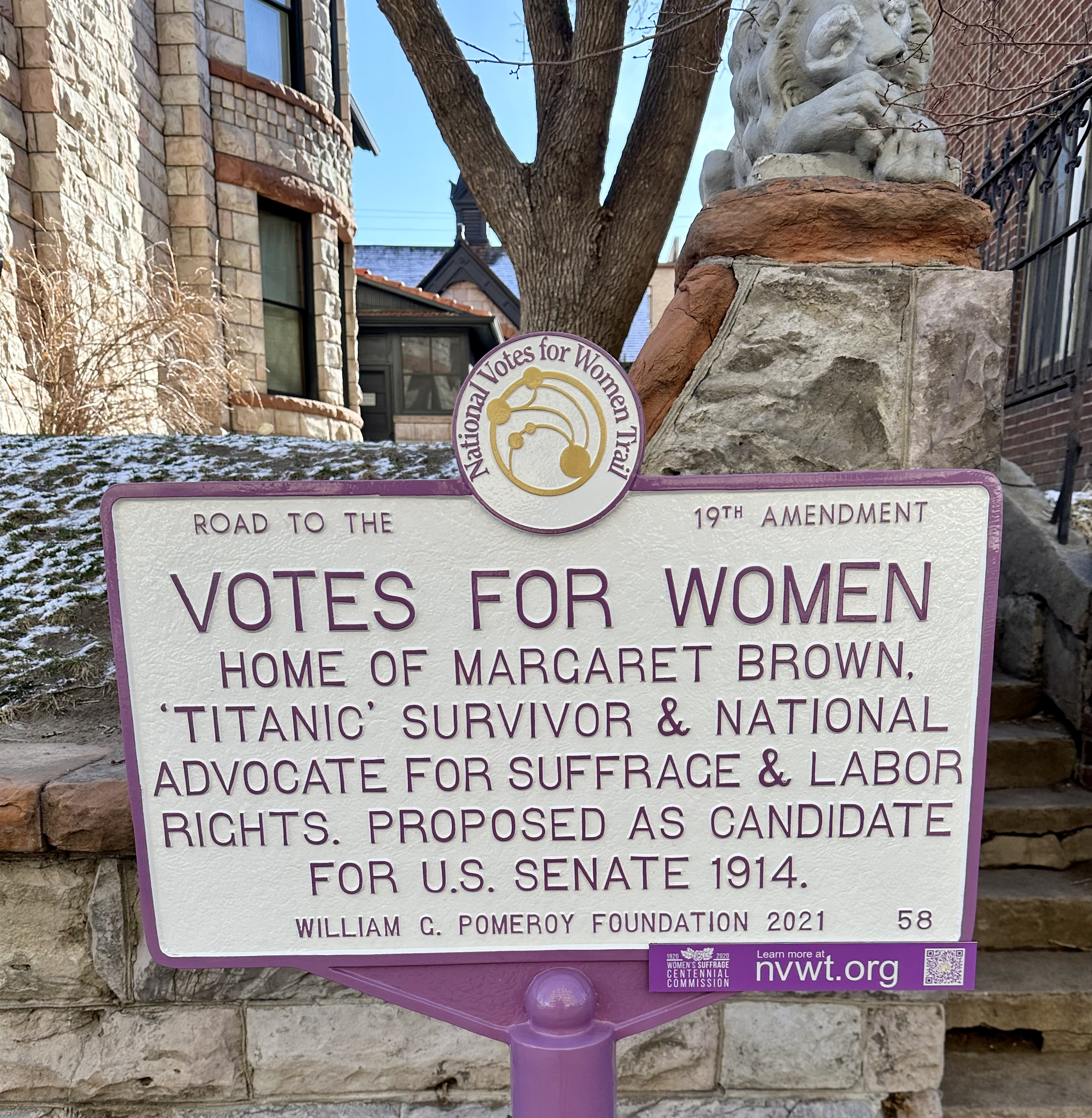
National Votes for Women Trail marker

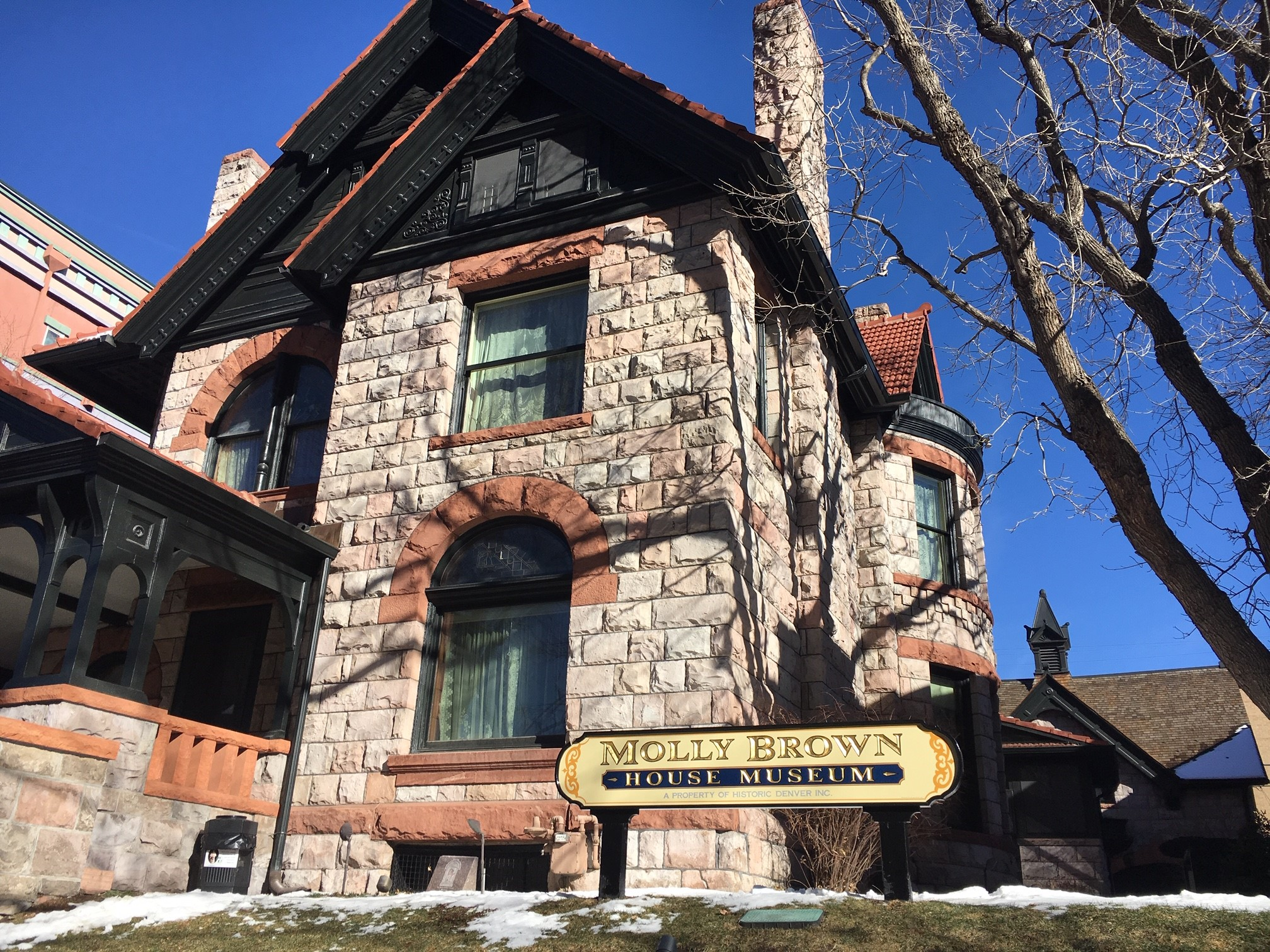
Molly Brown House

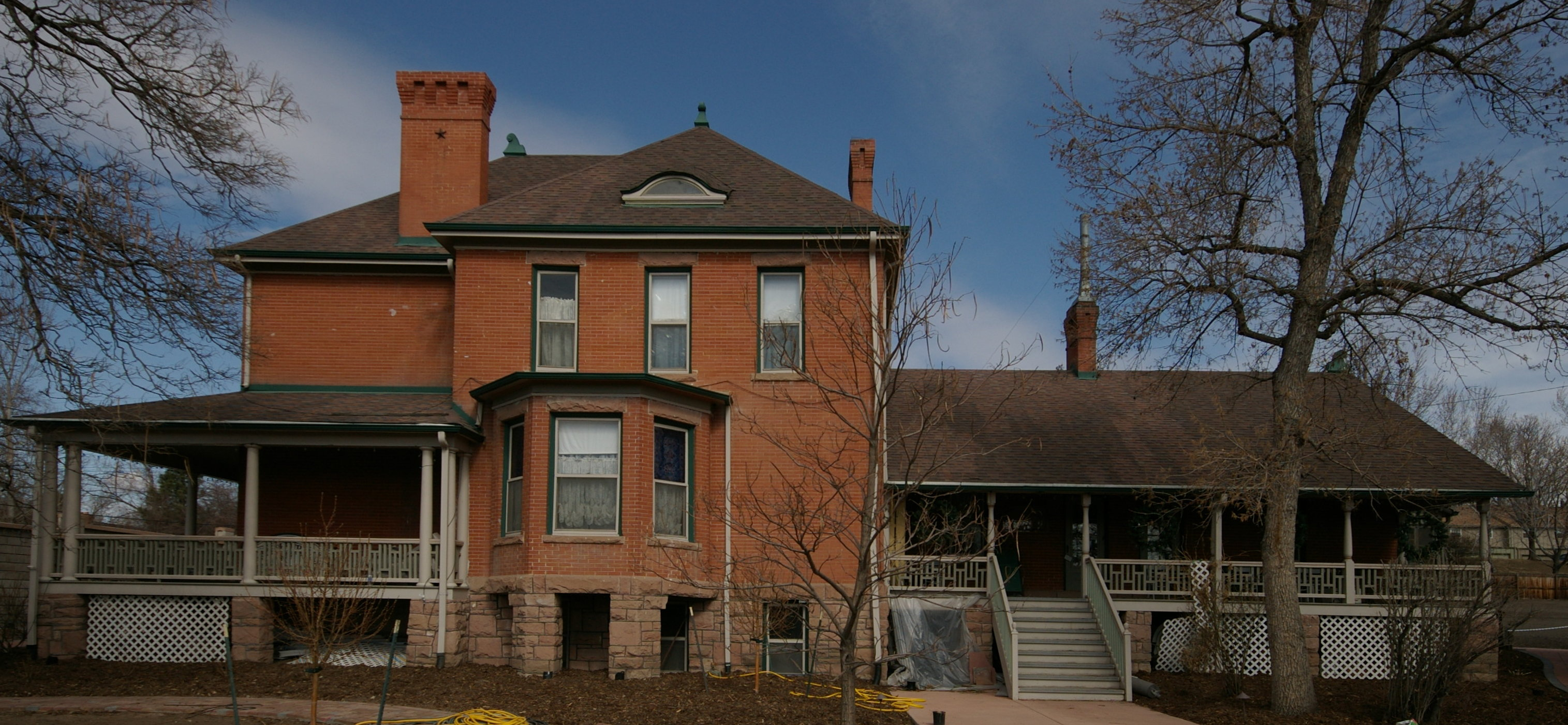
The Molly Brown Summer House

Brown's fame as a Titanic survivor helped her promote the philanthropic and activism issues she felt strongly about. She was concerned about the rights of workers and women, education and literacy for children, historic preservation, and commemoration of the bravery and chivalry displayed by the men aboard the Titanic.

Avoca Lodge, known as The Molly Brown Summer House, is in southwest Denver, Colorado near Bear Creek; the home served as a summer retreat for Brown and her husband James Joseph Brown. It is listed on the National Register of Historic Places. Brown's Denver, Colorado, home has been a museum since 1971. It is called the Molly Brown House Museum. There is a trail marker outside it as part of the National Votes for Women Trail; the marker was stolen in November 2023, but was found later that month.

On November 3, 1960, the Broadway musical The Unsinkable Molly Brown opened at the Winter Garden Theatre in New York City with music by Meredith Willson and book by Richard Morris. It starred Tammy Grimes as Molly Brown and ran for 532 performances. The 1964 film of the same name starred Debbie Reynolds; who was nominated for the Academy Award for Best Actress for her portrayal of Brown.

The three-room cottage where Brown was born is now the Molly Brown Birthplace and Museum; it sat at 600 Butler Street in Hannibal, Missouri until 2024. After dealing with issues of black mold for years, on December 17, 2024, the Molly Brown Birthplace was moved to Main Street in Hannibal, across the street from the Mark Twain boyhood home.

The theme park Disneyland Paris features a 19th-century riverboat attraction, the Molly Brown Riverboat, named after her. In 1965, astronauts Gus Grissom and John Young named their Gemini spacecraft Molly Brown in her honor.

In 1985, Brown was inducted into the Colorado Women's Hall of Fame.

=== Portrayals ===
Brown has been portrayed by:

- Thelma Ritter (1953) (Titanic). Brown's name was changed to Maude Young, and her Colorado gold-mining fortune became a Montana lead-mining fortune.
- Cloris Leachman (1957) (Telephone Time) ("The Unsinkable Molly Brown")
- Tucker McGuire (1958) (A Night to Remember)
- Tammy Grimes (1960) (The Unsinkable Molly Brown) (Broadway musical); Grimes won a Tony Award for her performance.
- Debbie Reynolds (1964) (The Unsinkable Molly Brown) (film version); Reynolds received an Academy Award nomination for Best Actress.
- Cloris Leachman (1979) (S.O.S. Titanic) (TV movie); Leachman reprises her role from 20 years previously
- Fionnula Flanagan (1983) (Voyagers!) ("Voyagers of the Titanic")
- Susana Giménez (1991) (The Unsinkable Molly Brown Argentine version of the Broadway Musical)
- Marilu Henner (1996) (Titanic) (TV miniseries)
- Kathy Bates (1997) (Titanic)
- Morgan Hill (1998) (Titanic: Secrets Revealed)
- Judy Prestininzi (2003) (Ghosts of the Abyss) (Documentary)
- Judy Prestininzi (2005) (Last Mysteries of the Titanic) (Documentary)
- Linda Kash (2012) (Titanic) (TV series/2 episodes)
- Charlotte McCurry (2012) (Save Our Souls: The Titanic Inquiry)
- Beth Malone (2020) (The Unsinkable Molly Brown) (Off Broadway revival)
- Kathy Deitch (2022) (Titanique) (Off Broadway musical)
- Deborah Cox (2026) (Titanique) (Broadway musical)
