= List of Denver landmarks =

Location of Denver in the United States of America.

The City and County of Denver has a formal historic designation program that establishes Denver landmarks. These are designated by ordinances of Denver's city council. The first three sites so designated, on January 10, 1968, are the Emmanuel/Sherith Chapel, Constitution Hall (site) (destroyed by fire in 1977), and the Governor's Mansion. The list includes a sublist of historic districts. Boundaries of historic districts appear in Landmark_Map_Sep2019

Check:

== Significant landmarks ==
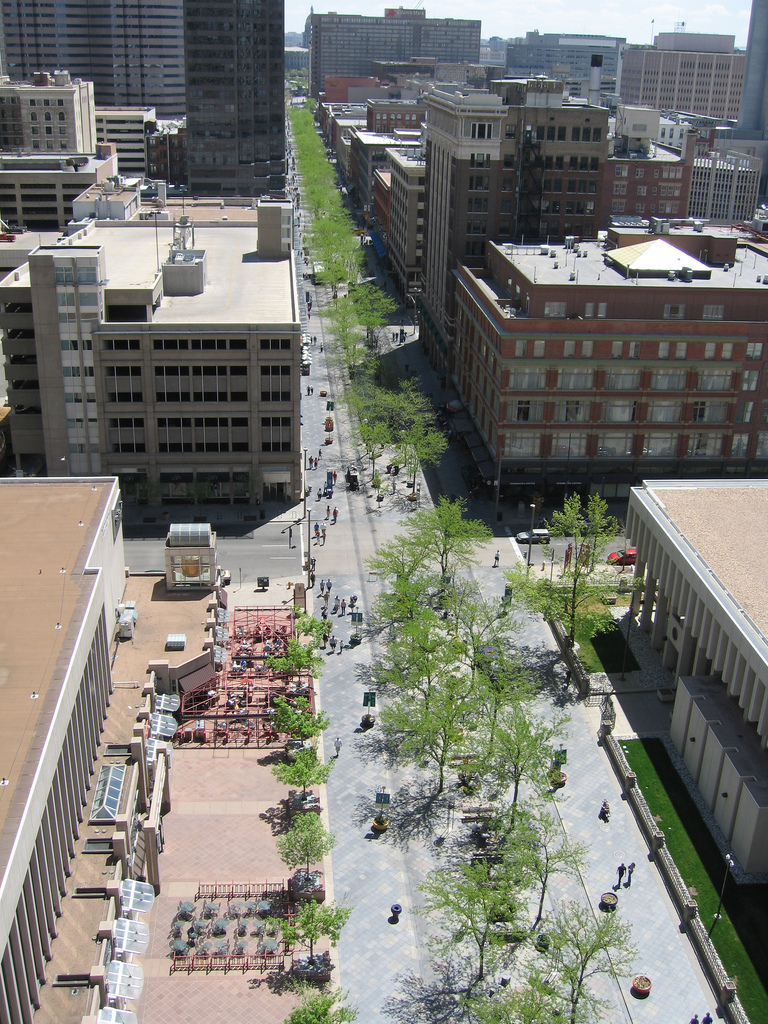
View from the Daniels & Fisher Tower

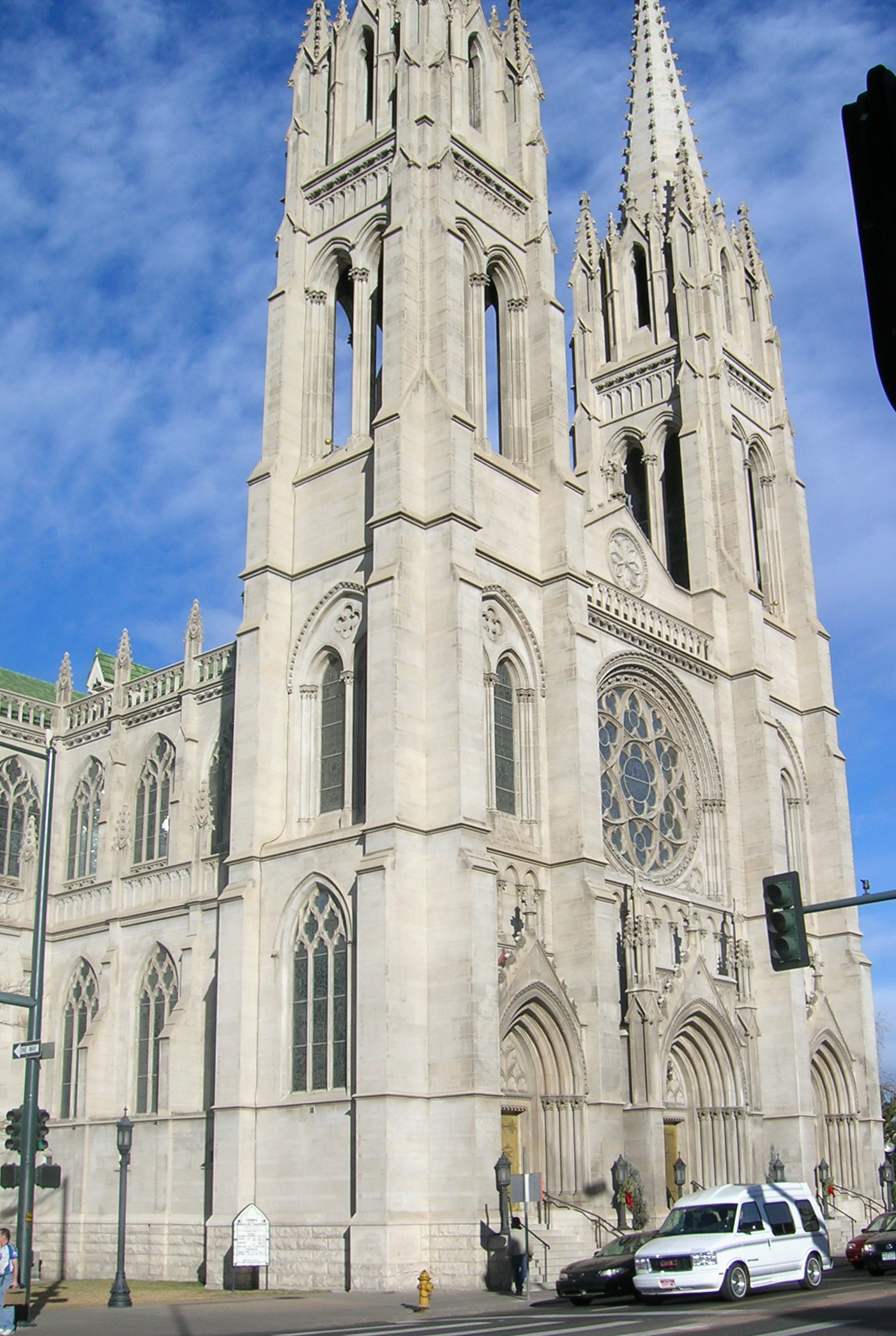
The Cathedral Basilica of the Immaculate Conception

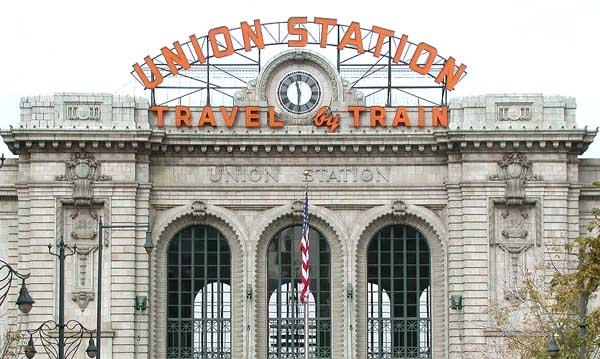
The Union Station of Denver, both a significant historical building and future hub of RTD's rail network

The Denver Botanic Gardens

Denver has many visitor attractions and landmarks, including:

Official ones:

- Brown Palace Hotel, proclaimed by Elvis as "The best hotel in the world", a historic hotel that has hosted many celebrities, dignitaries, and other important people.
- Denver Mint, the single largest producer of coins in the world.
- Denver Firefighters Museum
- Four Mile House, an important stop on the Cherokee Trail and the oldest standing residential building in the metropolitan area.
- Molly Brown House, where "The unsinkable Molly Brown" once lived.
- Samsonite house, the historic home of the Shwayder family (1900–1921) who founded the Samsonite Luggage Corporation
- Union Station (shown), a magnificent three-story building and the future hub of RTD's commuter rail network

Unofficial and official and other ones:

- 16th Street Mall is a mile long pedestrian-only street that runs from Denver Union Station in LoDo to Broadway at the other end of downtown.
- Avenue Theater, a professional theater located in the Downtown Denver vicinity.
- Black American West Museum, which reflects the history of African Americans in the West and Denver.
- Buckhorn Exchange, Denver's oldest restaurant, a historic old-west steakhouse
- Cathedral Basilica of the Immaculate Conception, Denver (shown), where Pope John Paul II celebrated mass twice in August, 1993.
- Civic Center, a neoclassical park, and the cultural, art and governmental center of Denver.
- Colorado Convention Center, the newly renovated large convention center often hosts major events held in Denver.
- Colorado State Capitol, the seat of the state government of Colorado.
- Confluence Park, where the city started at the confluence of the South Platte and Cherry Creek.
- D&F Tower, when it was built in 1910, it was the tallest building west of the Mississippi.
- Denver's Downtown Aquarium, a full-sized public aquarium.
- Denver Art Museum, the largest art museum between Kansas City and San Francisco.
- Denver Botanic Gardens (shown), which made an appearance in Woody Allen's Sleeper
- Denver Museum of Nature and Science, one of America's premier natural history museums.
- Denver Performing Arts Complex, the second largest performing arts center in the US after New York City's Lincoln Center.
- Denver Public Library, which serves Denver's educational and entertainment needs from 24 locations and two bookmobiles.
- Denver Zoo, one of the largest zoos of its kind, it features a gift shop and a wide array of exotic animals.
- Dikeou Collection, a private collection of contemporary art that is open to the public.
- Elitch Gardens Theme Park, an amusement park.
- Elitch Theatre, a historic theatre at the site of the original Elitch Gardens.
- Ellie Caulkins Opera House
- History Colorado Center, the modern state history museum is Denver's newest cultural attraction located in the Golden Triangle Museum District, and features interactive exhibits, artifacts, the Stephen H. Hart Research Library, a cafe and gift shop.
- Lloyd M. Joshel House, one of the finest examples of International Style architecture in Denver.
- One Cheesman Place, one of Denver's first high-rises built in the International Style.
- Kirkland Museum of Fine & Decorative Art, a museum featuring works of Vance Kirkland and others.
- Red Rocks, a Denver-owned park and outdoor amphitheater located 15 miles west of city limits known for its natural red rock formations, acoustics and legendary concerts.
- Richthofen Castle, a castle built by the uncle and godfather of the Red Baron.
- Sakura Square or "Tiny Tokyo", the center of the historical and prominent Japanese community of Denver, first formed around 1944.
- Tattered Cover, a very popular independent bookstore with two locations in Denver (LoDo and Colfax Avenue), and one in the suburb of Highlands Ranch. It has hosted lectures by Denverites Allen Ginsberg and Neal Cassady.
- Wells Fargo Center, also known as the "cash register" building, one of the city's most identifiable buildings.

== Historic districts ==
The designated historic districts are:

1. 200 Block South Lincoln Street Historic District D‐53 2016 1889‐1895
2. Alamo Placita Historic District | D-3620001889‐1942
3. Allen M. Ghost Historic District | D-512010Priorto&Including1941
4. Baker Neighborhood Historic District | D-3720001873‐1937
5. Ballpark Neighborhood Historic District | D-4220021880‐1948
6. City Park Pavilion Historic District | D-171990
7. Civic Center Historic District | D-619761909‐1979(DG) This is also a NRHP HD
8. Clayton College Historic District | D-341999
9. Clements Historic District | D-41975Priorto&Including1930
10. Country Club Historic District | D-1819901902‐1945(DG) This is also a NRHP HD.
11. Country Club Gardens Historic District | D-392001
12. Curtis Park 'A' Historic District | D-261995Priorto&Including1910
13. Curtis Park 'B' Historic District | D-251995Priorto&Including1925
14. Curtis Park 'C' Historic District | D-301997Priorto&Including1915
15. Curtis Park 'D' Historic District | D-321997
16. Curtis Park 'E' Historic District | D-4820071890‐1910
17. Curtis Park 'F' Historic District | D-4920081870‐1902
18. Curtis Park 'G' Historic District | D-502010Priorto&Including1915
19. Curtis Park 'H' Historic District | D-522011Priorto&Including1915
20. Denver City Beautiful Movement Parkways Historic District | D-291997
21. Downtown Denver Historic District | D-382000
22. Driving Park Historic District | D-4320031880‐1942
23. East Park Place Historic District | D-231993Priorto&Including1920
24. East Seventh Avenue Historic District | D-211993Priorto&Including1943
25. Five Points Historic Cultural District Historic District | D-402002Priorto&Including1964
26. Florence F. Martin Ranch Historic District | D-241994
27. Frank S. Snell Subdivision Historic District | D-121986Priorto&Including1918
28. Grant Street Historic District | D-4520041900‐1920
29. Humboldt Street Historic District | D-21972Priorto&Including1925
30. Humboldt Street‐Park Avenue Historic District | D-4420041880‐1908and1945‐1946
31. Lafayette Street Historic District | D-141987Priorto&Including1918
32. Larimer Square Historic District | D-11970Priorto&Including1915
33. Lower Downtown Historic District | D-1519881860‐1941(DG)
34. Lowry Officers' Row Historic District | D-281995
35. Lowry Technical Training Center Historic District | D-271995
36. Montclair Historic District | D-51975Priorto&Including1940
37. Morgan's Subdivision Historic District | D-81978
38. Ninth Street Park Historic District | D-31973Priorto&Including1930
39. Old Highland Business Historic District | D-111979Priorto&Including1895
40. Packard's Hill Historic District | D-5420171886‐1940
41. Park Avenue Historic District | D-4120021893‐1930
42. Pennsylvania Street Historic District | D-311997Priorto&Including1955
43. Potter Highlands Historic District | D-131987Priorto&Including1943
44. Quality Hill Historic District | D-191992Priorto&Including1932
45. River Drive Historic District | D-5620191886‐1923
46. S.R. DeBoer Historic District | D-4720071876‐1974
47. Sherman‐Grant Historic District | D-331997Priorto&Including1959
48. Smith's Ditch (City Ditch) Historic District | D-71977Priorto&Including1870
49. Speer Boulevard Historic District | D-161988
50. Swallow Hill Historic District | D-351999Priorto&Including1917
51. Tilden School for Teaching Health Historic District | D-5720191915‐1931
52. Vassar School Bungalows Historic District | D-5520181925‐1926
53. W. 28th Avenue Historic District | D-101979Priorto&Including1900
54. Witter‐Cofield Historic District | D-201993Priorto&Including1943
55. Wolff Place Historic District | D-4620061883‐1926
56. Wyman Historic District | D-221993Priorto&Including1955

== Individual landmarks ==
The publication Individual Landmarks in the City and County of Denver lists these individual landmarks:

Fields are: LM# landmark name (ordinance) / common name (if different from ordinance) / address in ordinance / current address (if different from ordinance) / ordinance number / year of designation / estimated year of construction / historic district name (if applicable)

1 Emmanuel-Shearith Israel Chapel / Emmanuel Episcopal Chapel, 1201 10th Street 955 Lawrence Way 1 1968 1876–1877
2 Constitution Hall (building demolished, site still designated) 1501–1507 Blake Street 2 1968 1865 (demolished about 1980) Lower Downtown
3 Cheesman–Boettcher (Governor's) Mansion Governor's Mansion 400 E. 8th Avenue 3 1968 1908 East 7th Avenue
4 St. John's Episcopal Cathedral 1313 Clarkson Street 123 1968 1911
5 Cathedral of the Immaculate Conception 301 E. Colfax Avenue 401 E. Colfax Avenue 124 1968 1902–1912
6 Evans House Byers–Evans House 1310 Bannock Street 125 1968 c. 1880 Civic Center
7 Trinity Methodist Church, 1820 Broadway, 126 1968 1888 downtown Denver
8 First Baptist Church, 230 E. 14th Avenue, 321 1968 1934–1938 Civic Center. 1938 built; 2005 NRHP-listed.
9 First Church of Christ, Scientist, 1401 Logan Street 322 1968 1901–1906
10 Daniels and Fisher Tower 1101 16th Street 1601 Arapahoe Street 420 1968 1909–1911 Downtown Denver
11 Denver Women's Press Club, 1325 Logan Street 421 1968 1910
12 Four Mile House, 715 S. Forest Street 422 1968 1859
13 Zion Baptist Church of Denver 933 E. 24th Avenue 104 1969 1892–1893
14 St. Elizabeth's Church, 1060 11th Street, 105 1969 1896–1902. NRHP-listed.
15 South Broadway Christian Church, 23 Lincoln Street 23–25 Lincoln Street 106 1969 1891
16 Evans Memorial Chapel, University of Denver campus 107 1969 1878
17 St. Mark's Church, 1160 Lincoln Street, 50 1970 1890
18 Scott Methodist Episcopal Church / Christ Methodist Episcopal Church, 2201 Ogden Street 999 E 22nd Avenue 51 1970 1889
19 St. Cajetan's Church, 1146 9th Street 150 1970 1926
20 House of Lions / Molly Brown House, 1340 Pennsylvania Street 113 1971 1889 Pennsylvania Street
21 Navarre Building / Bricker Collegiate Institute, 1727 Tremont Street 1725 Tremont Place 470 1971 1880 Downtown Denver
22 Smith House / Eben Smith House, 1801 York Street, 471 1971 1902–1905. 1985 NRHP-listed.
23 Pope-Thompson-Wasson House, 1320 Race Street 166 1972 c. 1894 Wyman
24 Denver Tramway Power Plant / REI, 1416 Platte Street 212 1972 1901
25 Pearce-McAllister Cottage, 1880 Gaylord Street 328 1972 1899
26 Tivoli Brewery and West Denver Turnhalle Opera House, 1320–1348 10th Street 900 Auraria Parkway 329 1972 oldest part of brewery 1881, majority 1890 and later. Turnhalle 1882
27 Buckhorn Exchange, 1000 Osage Street 330 1972 1886
28 Denver U.S. Mint, 320 W. Colfax Avenue 331 1972 1904–1906, additions Civic Center
29 Tears–McFarlane House, 1200 Williams Street 1290 Williams Street 635 1972 1898
30 Odd Fellows Hall 1545 Champa Street 645 1972 1887–1889 Downtown Denver
31 Tramway Cable Building, 1801 Lawrence Street 646 1972 1889
32 Richthofen Castle, 7020 E. 12th Avenue 249 1973 1883–1887 Montclair
33 Croke-Patterson-Campbell House, Patterson Inn 420–428 E. 11th Avenue 457 1973 c. 1890–1892 Pennsylvania Street
34 Foster–McCauley–Symes–French Consulate 738 Pearl Street 736 Pearl Street 458 1973 1905 East 7th Avenue
35 Sacred Heart Church, 2760 Larimer Street, 2740–2760 Larimer Street, 529 1973 1879–1880
36 Thomas Hornsby Ferril House 2123 Downing Street 530 1973 1889
37 Asbury Methodist Church, 2205 W. 30th Avenue, 653 1973 c. 1891
38 Hermann H. Heiser House, 3016 Osceola Street 653 1973 c. 1892 Wolff Place
39 Queree House, 2914 W. 29th Avenue 653 1973 1888
40 Hugh Mackay House 3359 Alcott Street 653 1973 1893 Potter Highlands
41 Cox House, 3417 Lowell Boulevard, 653 1973 c. 1908
42 Cox Gargoyle House, 3425 Lowell Boulevard 653 1973 c. 1892
43 2501 High Street / High House, Raughton House, 2501 High Street 653 1973 c. 1903–1905
44 John Brisben Walker House, 3520 Newton Street 653 1973 c. 1884–1885
45 Cheesman Memorial / Cheesman Park, 1000 High Street 654 1973 c. 1907
46 Botanic Gardens House, 909 York Street 654 1973 c. 1926 Morgan's Subdivision
47 Boettcher Memorial Center, 1005 York Street 1019 York Street 654 1973 1966
48 Eugene Field House, Washington Park, 701 S. Franklin Street 654 1973 c. 1875. Also is NRHP-listed.
49 Red Rocks Theater, Red Rocks Park 18300 W. Alameda Street 654 1973 1936–1941, addition 1959
50 Montclair Community Center The Molkery Montclair Park 6820 E. 12th Avenue 654 1973 1888 Montclair
51 James A. Fleming House, Platt Park, 1501 S. Logan Street 654 1973 1882–1883
52 Dennis Sheedy House, 1115 Grant Street 31 1974 1892 Sherman–Grant
53 Fire Station No. 1, 1326 Tremont Place, 58 1974 1909. 1979 NRHP-listed.
54 Hallett House, 900 Logan Street, 81 1974 1888–1892 Quality Hill
55 940 Logan Street / Campbell House, 940 Logan Street, 81 1974 c. 1890 Quality Hill
56 950 Logan Street McKinley Mansion, 950 Logan Street 948–952 Logan Street 81 1974 c. 1890 Quality Hill
57 Lipe House Clemes–Lipe House, Winter–Lipe House, 901 Pennsylvania Street 901 Pennsylvania Street, 475 E. 9th Avenue 81 1974 c. 1895–1901 Quality Hill
58 Taylor House, 945 Pennsylvania Street 945–949 Pennsylvania Street 81 1974 1900 Quality Hill
59 Hitchings Block, 1620 Market Street 349 1974 1892–1893 Lower Downtown
60 Liebhart–Lindner Building, Liebhardt–Lindner Building 1624 Market Street 1626–1628 Market Street 349 1974 1881 Lower Downtown
61 McCrary Building, 1634–1638 Market Street 349 1974 c. 1884–1889 Lower Downtown
62 1642 Market Street 1642 Market Street 349 1974 1885 Lower Downtown
63 1644–1650 Market Street 1644–1650 Market Street 349 1974 1884–1888 Lower Downtown
64 1322–1332 17th Street Columbia Hotel 1322–1332 17th Street 1650–1660 Market Street, 1330–1380 17th Street 349 1974 1880 Lower Downtown
65 US Post Office and Federal Building / Byron White Federal Courthouse, 1823 Stout Street, 506 1974 1916
66 St. Elizabeth's Retreat Chapel, 2825 W. 32nd Avenue 2825–2845 W. 32nd Avenue 625 1974 c. 1897 Potter Highlands
67 St. Andrew's Memorial Church 2015 Glenarm Place 625 1974 c. 1908–1909 Clements
68 Voorhees House, 1471 Stuart Street 736 1974 1890
69 1435 Stuart Street Smith House, 1435 Stuart Street 736 1974 1890
70 Raymond House Castle Marne 1572 Race Street 736 1974 1890 Wyman
71 3205 W. 21st Avenue Half-Moon House, 3205 W. 21st Avenue 689 1974 c. 1888 Witter–Cofield
72 1389 Stuart Street Bliss House, 1389 Stuart Street 843 1974 c. 1892. NRHP-listed.
73 Bosworth House, 1400 Josephine Street 843 1974 c. 1889
74 Malo House, 500 E. 8th Avenue 72 1975 1921 East 7th Avenue
75 John Porter House, 777 Pearl Street 72 1975 1923 East 7th Avenue
76 Adams-Fitzell House, 1359 Race Street 72 1975 1891–1892 Wyman
77 Corona-Dora Moore School, Dora Moore School, 846 Corona Street 72 1975 1889
78 Coyle/Chase House, 532 W. 4th Avenue 183 1975 1891
79 1200 Pennsylvania Street Dunning–Benedict House 1200 Pennsylvania Street 244 1975 1889 Pennsylvania Street
80 1207 Pennsylvania Street / Keating House, / Capitol Hill Mansion Bed & Breakfast, 1207 Pennsylvania Street, 244 1975 c. 1891–1892 Pennsylvania Street. 1891 built; 1980 NRHP-listed.
81 Treat Hall, Centennial Hall, Colorado Women's College, 1800 Pontiac Street 373 1975 1890–1909
82 St. Luke's Episcopal Church, 1270 Poplar Street, 409 1975 1890
83 2143 Grove Street Frederick W. Neef House, 2143 Grove Street 409 1975 1886 Witter–Cofield
84 Creswell House, 1244 Grant Street 1244–1250 Grant Street 409 1975 1889
85 Daly House, 1034 Logan Street 410 1975 1894–1895
86 930 Logan Street McNeil House, 930 Logan Street 591 1975 1890 Quality Hill
87 Gate Lodge at Fairmount Cemetery, 400 S. Quebec Street 4 1976 1890
88 Ivy Chapel at Fairmount Cemetery, 400 S. Quebec Street 4 1976 1890
89 1444 Stuart Street Stuart Street House – A, Spangler House 1444 Stuart Street 59 1976 1888–1892
90 1208 Logan Street Baker–Plested House 1208 Logan Street 124 1976 1886
91 The Cornwall, 1317 Ogden Street, 921 E. 13th Street, 1301 Ogden Street 174 1976 1901
92 1410 High Street Sykes/Nicholson Mansion, House of a Thousand Candles, 1410 High Street 293 1976 1897 Wyman
93 1437 High Street / Watson House, 1437 High Street 293 1976 1894 Wyman
94 Kerr House, 1900 E. 7th Avenue Parkway 360 1976 1925 East 7th Avenue. 1924 built; 2002 NRHP-listed.
95 Grant-Humphreys Mansion, 770 Pennsylvania Street 476 1976 1902 East 7th Avenue
96 3611–3615 Osage Street Frank Damascio House, 3611–3615 Osage Street 25 1977 c. 1895
97 St. Thomas Episcopal Church, 2201 Dexter Street, 151 1977 1908
98 Phipps House Belcaro, 3400 Belcaro Drive 208 1977 1932
99 Adolph Zang Mansion, 709 Clarkson Street 253 1977 1902–1904 East 7th Avenue
100 Chapel of Our Merciful Savior (All Saints' Church) 2222 W. 32nd Avenue 452 1977 1890
101 Mount Carmel Church, 3549 Navajo Street 452 1977 1898–1904
102 St. Patrick Mission Church and Rectory, 3325 Pecos Street 452 1977 1907–1910
103 Equitable Building, 730 17th Street, 453 1977 c. 1892–1893 Downtown Denver. 9-story commercial building, Denver's tallest building from 1892–1911.
104 1375 Josephine Street / Gates House, 1375 Josephine Street 492 1977 1892. NRHP-listed.
105 Colorado Federal Building / Ideal Building, 821 17th Street 550 1977 1907, addition 1927 Downtown Denver
106 1129 E. 17th Avenue / Rosenzweig House, 1129 E. 17th Avenue 550 1977 c. 1882
107 Walters-Brierly House, 2259 Gilpin Street 132 1978 1888
108 1030 Logan Street / Stearns House, 1030 Logan Street 386 1978 1896
109 Wells Fargo Building, 1338 15th Street 529 1978 1874 Lower Downtown
110 Frank E. Edbrooke House, 931 E. 17th Avenue 729 1978 c. 1889 Swallow Hill
111 1390 Stuart Street Kenehan House, 1390 Stuart Street 729 1978 c. 1892
112 2841 Perry Street / Woodbury House, 2841 Perry Street 769 1978 c. 1895
113 2851 Perry Street Lobach House, 2851 Perry Street 769 1978 c. 1893
114 Thomas M. Field House (building demolished due to fire, site still designated) E. Iliff Avenue and S. Clarkson Street 79 1979 1893
115 John C. Mitchell House "Trail's End" 680 Clarkson Street 670–680 Clarkson Street 123 1979 1893 East 7th Avenue
116 1532 Emerson Street / Adolph J. Zang House, Gargoyle House, 1532 Emerson Street 261 1979 1889. NRHP-listed.
117 Guerrieri-DeCunto House, 1650 Pennsylvania Street 388 1979 1896
118 William E. Moses House, 4001 W. 30th Avenue 631 1979 1895 Wolff Place
119 Gebhard-Smith House, 2253 Downing Street 632 1979 1884
120 Henry Lee House 2653 W. 32nd Avenue 260 1980 c. 1894–1895 Potter Highlands
121 Kistler-Rodriguez House, 700 E. 9th Avenue 296 1980 1920
122 Henri Foster House, 2533 W. 32nd Avenue 419 1980 1874 Potter Highlands
123 Clements Rowhouse, 2201–2217 Glenarm Place 617 1980 1883 Clements
124 Mattie Silks House, 2009 Market Street 5 1981 prior to 1876
125 Baerresen/Freeman House, 1718 Gaylord Street 121 1981 1903–1904
126 Butters House, 1129 Pennsylvania Street 372 1981 1890–1891 Pennsylvania Street
127 Fleming House, 1133 Pennsylvania Street 371 1981 1893 Pennsylvania Street. listed on the National Register of Historic Places in Downtown Denver, Colorado as "Fleming–Hanington House".
128 Flower/Vaile House, 1610 Emerson Street 536 1981 1889–1890 Swallow Hill
129 Wheeler Block, 2134–2150 W. 29th Avenue 2150 W. 29th Avenue 597 1981 1890–1894
130 Cerrones Grocery Store, 3617 Osage Street 3617–3621 Osage Street 698 1981 1893
131 Lowry Chapel No. 1 / Eisenhower Chapel Lowry Air Force Base, 293 Roslyn Street 26 1982 1941
132 Sheridan/Hendrie & Bolthoff Building 1635 17th Street 28 1982 c. 1892 Lower Downtown
133 Wolcott School, 1410–1414 Marion Street 27 1982 1898, addition 1906
134 Delos Allen Chappell House 1555 Race Street 116 1982 1895 Wyman
135 Peter McCourt House, 1471 High Street 185 1982 1896 Wyman
136 Masonic Temple Building, 1614 Welton Street 1614 Welton Street, 535 16th Street 195 1982 1889–1890 Downtown Denver
137 Denver Athletic Club Building, 1325 Glenarm Place 587 1982 1889, Additions 1892, 1925, 1965, 1973, 1984, 1996
138 Barney Ford Building, 1514 Blake Street 635 1982 1863, Additions 1875, 1889 Lower Downtown
139 Curry-Chucovich House 1439 Court Place 654 1982 1888
140 Kettle Building, 1422 Larimer Street 47 1983 1873 Larimer Square
141 Congdon Building / Apollo Hall, 1421–1425 Larimer Street 1419–1427 Larimer Street 48 1983 1870s Larimer Square
142 Barnum Building, 1412 Larimer Street 1408 Larimer Street 49 1983 1889 Larimer Square
143 Sussex Building, 1430 Larimer Street 1426–1430 Larimer Street 50 1983 1880 Larimer Square
144 Granite Building (1882), 1460 Larimer Street, 1224–1230 15th Street 1454–1460 Larimer Street, 1226–1228 15th Street 51 1983 1882 Larimer Square. 39.74795°N 104.99854°W
145 Crawford Building, 1437–1439 Larimer Street 1439 Larimer Street 52 1983 1875 Larimer Square
146 Gallup-Stanbury Building, 1445–1451 Larimer Street 1445 Larimer Street 53 1983 1873 Larimer Square
147 Lincoln Hall Building, 1415 Larimer Street 1413–1417 Larimer Street 54 1983 early 1880s Larimer Square
148 McKibben Building, 1411 Larimer Street 1411 Larimer Street 55 1983 c. 1890 Larimer Square
149 Miller Building, 1401–1407 Larimer Street 56 1983 1889 Larimer Square
150 1738 Wynkoop Street Edward W. Wynkoop Building, Spice and Commission Warehouse 1738 Wynkoop Street 437 1983 1900–1901 Lower Downtown
151 Insurance Exchange Building / Denver Gas & Electric Building, 910 15th Street 548 1983 1908–1910 Downtown Denver
152 Oxford Hotel and Office Annex, 1600 17th Street, 1645 Wazee Street, 1624–1628 17th Street 1600 17th Street, 1612–1616 17th Street, 1659 Wazee Street 571 1983 1891, 1902 addition, 1912 annex Lower Downtown
153 3209 W. Fairview Place Bosler House, Bosler–Yankee House 3209 W. Fairview Place 26 1984 c. 1875
154 Mayan Theatre, 110 Broadway 83 1984 1930
155 Sarah Platt Decker Branch Library 1501 S. Logan Street 501 1984 1912–1913
156 Emerson School Building, 1420 Ogden Street 500 1984 1884–1885
157 2900 Champa Street Anfenger Mansion 2900 Champa Street 597 1984 1884 Curtis Park 'G'
158 number not used
159 Wood–Morris–Bonfils House Louis 707 Washington Street 318 1985 1911, addition 1987 East 7th Avenue
160 Hotel Hope Building 1404 Larimer Street 1400–1404 Larimer Street 406 1985 c. 1888, addition 1993 Larimer Square
161 Barth Hotel, 1514 17th Street 1510–1516 17th Street 502 1985 1882 Lower Downtown
162 Windsor Stables Storefront Building, 1732–1770 Blake Street 1738–1770 Blake Street 554 1985 1881–1886 Lower Downtown
163 Fire Station No. 15, 1080 Clayton Street 759 1985 1903
164 Hose Company No. 1, 1963 Chestnut Place 1999 Chestnut Place 83 1986 c. 1883
165 Sweet-Miller House, 1075 Humboldt Street 84 1986 1906 Humboldt Street
166 First and Broadway Building, 101–115 Broadway, 15–27 W. 1st Avenue 289 1986 1907
167 Denver Press Club, 1330 Glenarm Place 649 1986 1925
168 Temple Emanuel, 1595 Pearl Street 161 1987 1899, addition 1924
169 Brind Mansion, 1000 Logan Street 257 1987 1910
170 Hanigan–Canino Terrace, 3500 Navajo Street 3500 Navajo Street, 1423–1437 W. 35th Avenue 264 1987 1890
171 Neusteter Building, 720 16th Street 716–750 16th Street 701 1987 c. 1889, renovation 1924, addition 1950 Downtown Denver
172 Wyatt School Hyde Park School, 3620 Franklin Street 56 1988 1887
173 Milheim House (relocated from 1355 Penn) 1355 Pennsylvania Street (original location) 1515 Race Street (moved to this site in 1989) 532 1988 1893 Wyman
174 Central Bank (West) Building (demolished and de-designated) 1100–1108 15th Street Designation Ord 533. Dedesignati on Ord 211 Designation 1988. Dedesignation 2008
175 Paramount Theatre, 1621 Glenarm Place 1621–1641 Glenarm Place 616 1988 1930 Downtown Denver
176 Lawrence N. Greenleaf Masonic Temple / Old Town of Harman Town Hall, 400 Saint Paul Street 37 1989 1891
177 Scottish Rite Masonic Temple, 1370 Grant Street 1364–1370 Grant Street, 340 E. 14th Avenue 162 1989 1923–1925
178 Brown Palace Hotel, 321 17th Street 321–401 17th Street 284 1989 1888–1892 Downtown Denver 39°44′39″N 104°59′14″W
179 Boston Building, 828 17th Street 822–830 17th Street, 1660–1690 Champa Street 368 1989 1890 Downtown Denver
180 Park Hill Library, 4705 Montview Boulevard 524 1989 1920
181 Byers Library, 675 Santa Fe Drive 525 1989 1918
182 Smiley Library, 4501 W. 46th Avenue 561 1989 1918
183 Woodbury Library, 3265 Federal Boulevard 562 1989 1913
184 Town Club/Crawford Hill House, 969 Sherman Street 150 E. 10th Avenue 676 1989 1906 Sherman–Grant
185 Guaranty Bank Building, 815 17th Street 801–817 17th Street, 1715–1717 Stout Street 231 1990 1920–1921 Downtown Denver
186 Ferguson–Gano House, 722 E. 7th Avenue 260 1990 c. 1898 East 7th Avenue
187 Annunciation Church, 3601 Humboldt Street 343 1990 1904–1907. 1990 NRHP-listed.
188 Porter House, 975 Grant Street 375 1990 c. 1912 Sherman–Grant
189 Greeters of America National Home, 1740 and 1760 Ulster Street 1740–1762 Ulster Street 404 1990 c. 1899
190 Moffat Station 2101 15th Street 405 1990 1906
191 Field Officer's Quarters, Fort Logan 3742 W. Princeton Circle 702 1990 1889
192 East High School, 1545 Detroit Street, 1600 City Park Esplanade 94 1991 1925
193 Cass House, 733 East 8th Avenue 359 1991 1899
194 Robinson House, 1225 Pennsylvania Street 670 1991 1906 Pennsylvania Street. NRHP-listed.
195 Stevens Elementary School, 1140 Columbine Street 756 1991 1900–1901
196 Denver Municipal Auditorium, 920 14th Street 908 14th Street, 1325 Champa Street 784 1991 1907–1908 Downtown Denver
197 South High School, 1700 E. Louisiana Avenue 785 1991 1925–1926
198 20th Street Recreation Center, 1011 20th Street 160 1992 1908
199 Brown/Garrey/Congdon House, 1300 E. 7th Avenue 322 1992 c. 1923 East 7th Avenue
200 Smedley Elementary School 4250 Shoshone Street 340 1992 1902, addition 1911
201 Jane Silverstein Ries House (home of Jane Silverstein Ries?) 737 Franklin Street 460 1992 1935 East 7th Avenue
202 West High School, 951 Elati Street 724 1992 1924–1926
203 Ashley Elementary School, 1914 Syracuse Street 896 1992 1930, addition 1951
204 Ebert Elementary School, 410 Park Avenue West 14 1993 1924
205 Huddart/Lydon House 2418 Stout Street 15 1993 1891 Curtis Park 'A'
206 La Paz, 10 Pool Hall / Douglas Undertaking Building, 2745 Welton Street 237 1993 prior to 1892, façade 1915 Five Points
207 Cody House, 2932 Lafayette Street 445 1993 1892
208 McBird House, 2225 Downing Street 446 1993 c. 1880
209 Whitehead/Peabody House, 1128 Grant Street 534 1993 1889
210 Burlington Hotel, 2201 Larimer Street, 1319 22nd Street 2201–2217 Larimer Street, 1307–1319 22nd Street 705 1993 1890–1891 Ballpark Neighborhood NRHP-listed.
211 Grant Middle School, 1751 S. Washington Street 775 1993 1951–1953
212 Skinner Middle School, 3435 W. 40th Avenue 835 1993 1922
213 Romeo Block, 2944–2958 Zuni Street 2944 Zuni Street, 2324 W. 30th Avenue 836 1993 1889
214 Denver Dry Goods Building, 700 16th Street 700–714 16th Street, 1545–1585 California Street, 703–749 15th Street 57 1994 1888–1889, additions 1898, 1907, 1994 Downtown Denver
215 Bluebird Theater 3315–3317 E. Colfax Avenue 250 1994 1914
216 Denver Tramway Company Building, 1100 14th Street 329 1994 c. 1910 Downtown Denver
217 Cato Residence (House with the Round Window) 3240 W. Hayward Place 330 1994 1890
218 Morey Middle School, 840 E. 14th Avenue 464 1994 1921
219 Denver Public Schools Administrative Building, Annex II, 414 14th Street 438 1994 1923
220 Chamberlin Observatory 2930 E. Warren Avenue 598 1994 1888–1890
221 Graham-Bible House, 2080 York Street 2030 York Street 676 1994 1892–1893
222 Washington Park Bath House / Washington Park, 600 S. Marion Street 677 1994 1911–1912
223 Nursery Building, 888 E. Iliff Avenue 678 1994 1923
224 Golda Meir House, 1146 9th Street 737 1994 1911
225 American National Bank Building 818 17th Street 754 1994 1910 Downtown Denver
226 Park Hill Elementary School, 5050 E. 19th Avenue 836 1994 1901, additions 1912, 1928, 1968–1969
227 Ogden Theater 935 E. Colfax Avenue 837 1994 1917
228 Joshel House 220 S. Dahlia Street 891 1994 1950–1951
229 Cory Elementary School, 1550 S. Steele Street 928 1994 1951–1952
230 Merrill Middle School 1551 S. Monroe Street 929 1994 1953
231 Washington Park Pavilion/Boat House Washington Park, 691 S. Franklin Street 930 1994 1913
232 Pueblo Trading Post Red Rocks Trading Post Red Rocks Park 18300 W. Alameda Street 931 1994 1931
233 Warming House at Evergreen Lake Dedisse Park, Evergreen, Colorado, 932 1994 1934
234 Nathan Savage Candy Company Building, 2162 Lawrence Street 981 1994 c. 1908
235 Fire Station No. 3, 2500 Washington Street 982 1994 1931 Five Points
236 Clarence F. Holmes Jr. House, 2330 Downing Street 983 1994 1892–1893
237 Asbury Elementary School, 1320 E. Asbury Avenue 14 1995 1925–1927
238 Feldhauser (Baldwin) Building / Baldwin Building, 1617–1623 California Street 85 1995 c. 1895 Downtown Denver
239 Austin Building, 2400–2418 E. Colfax Avenue 2400–2418 E. Colfax Avenue, 1472 Josephine Street 86 1995 1904 . Also NRHP-listed.
240 Rocky Mountain Consistory, Scottish Rite Temple (Cathedral) El Jebel Temple 1770 Sherman Street 137 1995 1906
241 Steele Elementary School, 320 S. Marion Parkway 180 1995 1913, addition and alteration 1929
242 Fager Residence, 2947 Umatilla Street 510 1995 c. 1883–1885
243 Tallmadge & Boyer Terrace and Commercial Block, 2925–2947 Wyandot Street 2925–2959 Wyandot Street, 2308–12 W. 30th Avenue 511 1995 1889
244 Fire Station Number 7, 3600 Tejon Street 596 1995 1909
245 Our Lady of Guadalupe Church, 3559 Kalamath Street 3555 Kalamath Street 597 1995 1947–1948
246 German House/Denver Turnverein 1570 Clarkson Street 700 1995 1921
247 Horace Mann Middle School, 4130 Navajo Street 709 1995 1931, additions 1956, 1994
248 Sherman School Art Students League, 200 Grant Street 753 1995 1893, addition 1920
249 3147 Umatilla Street Alexander Cowie House 3147 Umatilla Street 900 1995 1888
250 3225 Quivas Street Edward L. Fox House 3225 Quivas Street 901 1995 1888
251 1940–1946 W. 33rd Avenue Cole–DeRose Apartment House 1940–1946 W. 33rd Avenue 1940–1946 W. 33rd Avenue, 3252–3260 Tejon Street 902 1995 1895
252 Conine-Horan House, 2839 Wyandot Street 903 1995 1892
253 Elitch Gardens Theatre West 38th Avenue 4550 W. 37th Place 904 1995 1890
254 1305 Elizabeth Street Lorenzo Benson House 1305 Elizabeth Street 945 1995 1893
255 Sayre's Alhambra, 801 Logan Street 966 1995 1892
256 Crescent Hand Laundry Building, 2323–2327 W. 30th Avenue 55 1996 1891–1892
257 Elyria School, 4725 High Street 56 1996 1924
258 The Aldine, 1001–1021 E. 17th Avenue 196 1996 1890 Swallow Hill
259 Cranmer House, 200 Cherry Street 197 1996 1916–1917
260 Fire Station No. 14, 1426 Oneida Street 268 1996 1937
261 Fire Station No. 11, 40 W. 2nd Avenue 269 1996 1936–1937
262 Fire Station No. 18, 2205 Colorado Boulevard 270 1996 1912
263 Hover/Bromley Building, 1348 Lawrence Street 1390 Lawrence Street 271 1996 1901 Downtown Denver
264 Berkeley School, 5025–5055 Lowell Boulevard 5025–5065 Lowell Boulevard 573 1996 1894 and 1906, addition 1923
265 Bryant-Webster Elementary School, 3635 Quivas Street 574 1996 1930–1931
266 North High School, 2960 Speer Boulevard 760 1996 1911, additions 1913, 1960, 1983, 1993
267 Margery Reed Mayo Nursery, 1128 28th Street 761 1996 1926
268 St. Dominic's Church 3005 W. 29th Avenue 2905 Federal Boulevard 762 1996 1923–1926
269 Lake Middle School 1820 Lowell Boulevard 498 1996 1926
270 Enos House 841 Washington Street 497 1996 1891
271 William N. Byers Junior High School, 150 S. Pearl Street 971 1996 1920–1921
272 Edison School, 3350 Quitman Street 986 1996 1925, additions 1950, 1993
273 Ice House Beatrice Cold Storage Warehouse, 1801 Wynkoop Street 1801–1899 Wynkoop Street 1089 1996 1903, additions 1912, 1916, 1917
274 Huddart Terrace/Hoover Apartments 625 E. 16th Avenue 98 1997 c. 1894
275 Milo Smith House, 1360 Birch Street 99 1997 1890, additions 1911, 1919.
276 Shorter A.M.E. Church (Cleo Parker Robinson Dance) 119 Park Avenue West 224 1997 1925
277 Benjamin Brown House, 410 Marion Street 223 1997 c. 1889, additions c. 1900, 1930s, 1960s Driving Park
278 Cuthbert/Dines Mansion, 1350 Logan Street 343 1997 1901
279 Helene Apartments 1062 Pearl Street 344 1997 1904
280 Kinneavy Terrace, 2700–2714 Stout Street, 721–727 27th Street 430 1997 c. 1888 Curtis Park 'E'
281 Fifth Church of Christ Scientist / L2 Church, 1477 Columbine Street 486 1997 1929
282 Arthur E. Pierce House, 24 E. Ellsworth Ave 801 1997 1892
283 Nagel House, 2335 Stout Street 98 1998 c. 1888 Curtis Park 'H'
284 Kaub House, 2343 Stout Street 97 1998 c. 1886 Curtis Park 'H'
285 Lincoln Elementary School, 710 S. Pennsylvania Street 399 1998 1891, additions 1904, 1929, 1995
286 Ross-Lewin Double1912–1918 Logan Street 400 1998 1891
287 Westside Courthouse, 924 W. Colfax Avenue 478 1998 c. 1920
288 Grant House, 100 S. Franklin Street, 479 1998 1925
289 Highlands United Methodist Church, 3131 Osceola Street 547 1998 1922, additions 1925–1926, 1950–1951 Wolff Place
290 Haynes Townhouses, 1732 and 1738 Pearl Street 736 1998 1893
291 7th Avenue Congregational United Church of Christ (present-day Church of the Advent), 666 King Street 666–678 King Street 813 1998 1913
292 Arcanum-Beldame Apartments, 1904 Logan Street 30 1999 1907
293 Steck Elementary School, 425 Ash Street 450 Albion Street 389 1999 1929–1930, additions 1941, 1995
294 Epworth Church and Community Center, 1130 31st Street 436 1999 1915
295 Dugal Farmhouse, 4775 E. 6th Avenue 530 1999 1891, additions 1907, 1934
296 Leeman Automotive Company Building, 550 Broadway 654 1999 1932
297 Amos B. Hughes House, 3600 Clay Street 655 1999 1913 Potter Highlands
298 Chapel and Gateway on the Bethesda Campus, 4400 E. Iliff Avenue 268 2000 1926 and 1930
299a 404–440 W. 12th Avenue Ten–Winkel Towers 404–440 W. 12th Avenue 404–410 W. 12th Avenue 202 2000
299b 1173–1179 Delaware Street Carpenter Gothic Houses 1173–1179 Delaware Street 202 2000
300 The Colonnade Building (try Colonnade Building) 1210 E. Colfax Avenue, 1464 Marion Street 378 2000 1902, alteration 1984
301 Aromor Apartment Building, 225 E. 13th Avenue, 1309 Grant Street 402 2000 1926–1927
302 1750 Gilpin Building 1750 Gilpin Street 766 2000 1892–1893
303 Evans School Building, 1115 Acoma Street 1028 2001 1904
304 Hamilton Apartment Building, 1475 Humboldt Street 313 2002 1908
305 Norman Apartment Building, 99 S. Downing Street 564 2002 1924
306 Cameron Methodist Church 1600 S. Pearl Street 736 2003 1909–1913
307 Neahr House, 1017 S. Race Street 92 2004 1894
308 Globeville School, 5100 Lincoln Street 184 2004 1925, additions 1953, 1958, 1970
309 Church of the Ascension, 600 Gilpin Street 244 2004 1909, additions 1913, 1918, 1959 East 7th Avenue
310 Wolf House, 2036 Ogden Street 274 2004 c. 1892
311 Denver Union Station, 1701–1777 Wynkoop Street 705 2004 1881, 1894 and 1914
312 Fairmount Mausoleum, 430 Quebec Street 430 S. Quebec Street 64 2005 1930, additions 1936, 1948, 1947, 1957, 1971, 2003
313 Doyle Benton House, 1301 Lafayette Street 292 2005 1896
314 Tammen Hall, 1010 E. 19th Avenue 399 2005 1930–1932
315 Catherine Mullen Nurses Home, 1895 Franklin Street 27 2006 1932–1933
316 Baur Confectionary Company, 1512–1514 Curtis Street 460 2006 1881 Downtown Denver
317 John Collins United Methodist Church, 2300 S. Bannock Street 2320 S. Bannock Street 492 2006 1900
318 Myrtle Hill School Washington Park School 1125 S. Race Street 592 2006 1906, additions 1922, 1928, 1980s
319 Kappler–Cannon–Fieger Home, 1904 Kearney Street 65 2007 1912
320 Schulz–Neef House, 1739 E. 29th Avenue 623 2007 1881, addition c. 1900
321 Stanley School/Montclair School Paddington Station Preschool 1301 Quebec Street 624 2007 1890, addition 1991
322 Fitzroy Place, 2160 S. Cook Street 654 2007 1891–1892
323 Hangar 61, 8800 E. 21st Avenue 8700 E. 21st Avenue 724 2007 1959
324 Epiphany Episcopal Church, 100 Colorado Boulevard 138 2008 1941, addition 1960
325 Petrikin Estate 2109 E. 9th Avenue 418 2008 1917–1918 Morgan's Subdivision
326 Amter Residence, 222 S. Fairfax Street 333 2009 1952–1953
327 American Woodmen's Life Building, 2100 Downing Street 334 2009 1949–1950
328 Governor Carr Residence, 747 Downing Street 554 2009 1905 East 7th Avenue
329 2500 Walnut Street Benjamin Moore Building, 2500 Walnut Street 1 2010 1923, additions through 1947 Ballpark Neighborhood
330 Holland House, 2340 S. Josephine Street 429 2010 1932–1933
331 The Waldman, 1515 E. 9th Avenue 540 2011
332 Bonfils Memorial Theater/Lowenstein Theater 1475 Elizabeth Street 2516–2526 E. Colfax Avenue 93 2012
333 Dr. Margaret Long House, 2070 Colorado Boulevard 183 2013 c. 1908
334 Beth Eden Baptist Church, 3241 Lowell Boulevard 3257 Lowell Boulevard 292 2014 1931, additions 1940–1942, 1951
335 Gulliver–Lynch House, 227 S. Lincoln Street 506 2014 200 Block South Lincoln Street
336 Stadium Arena, 4655 Humboldt Street, 1301–1325 E. 46th Avenue 215 2016 1908–1909, additions 1973, 1991
337 Emily Griffith Opportunity School, 1250 Welton Street, 1261 Glenarm Place 1250 Welton Street, 1221–1261 Glenarm Place 311 2016 School: 1926, additions 1947, 1956. Shop buildings: 1941, 1951, 1954, 1956, 1978.
338 Ghost/Rose House, 1899 York Street 395 2016 c. 1906
339 First Unitarian Society of Denver Church, 1400 Lafayette Street 566 2016 1893, addition 1899
340 Ormleigh House, 2145 S. Adams Street 215 2018 1899
341 Wellshire Park Cottage, 2900 S. University Boulevard 688 2018 1926, c.1930, c.1960, c.1970
342 Meyer–Reed–Muraglia House, 670 Marion Street 933 2018 1904
343 Essex Apartments, 630–638 E. 16th Avenue 1160 2018 1908
344 Henderson House, 2600 Milwaukee Street 1208 2018 1963, addition 1971
345 Armour Building, 5001 Packing House Road 1539 2019 1917
346 Samsonite House, 637 Galapago Street 1542 2019 1890
347 Cableland, 4150 E. Shangri La Drive 344 2019 1986–1987
348 2288 S Milwaukee St Dr. Edward A. Jackson House, 2288 S Milwaukee St 954 2019 1902
349 1168 S Gilpin St Peet–Tatlock House, 1168 S Gilpin St 1119 2019 1916
350 1717 E Arizona Ave Peet–Abman House, 1717 E Arizona Ave 1120 2019 1915

== See also ==
- Bibliography of Colorado
- Geography of Colorado
- History of Colorado
- Index of Colorado-related articles
- List of Colorado-related lists
- Outline of Colorado
