= Baker, Denver =

Neighborhood of Denver, Colorado, United States

- Baker Historic District
- U.S. National Register of Historic Places
- U.S. Historic district
- Colorado State Register of Historic Properties
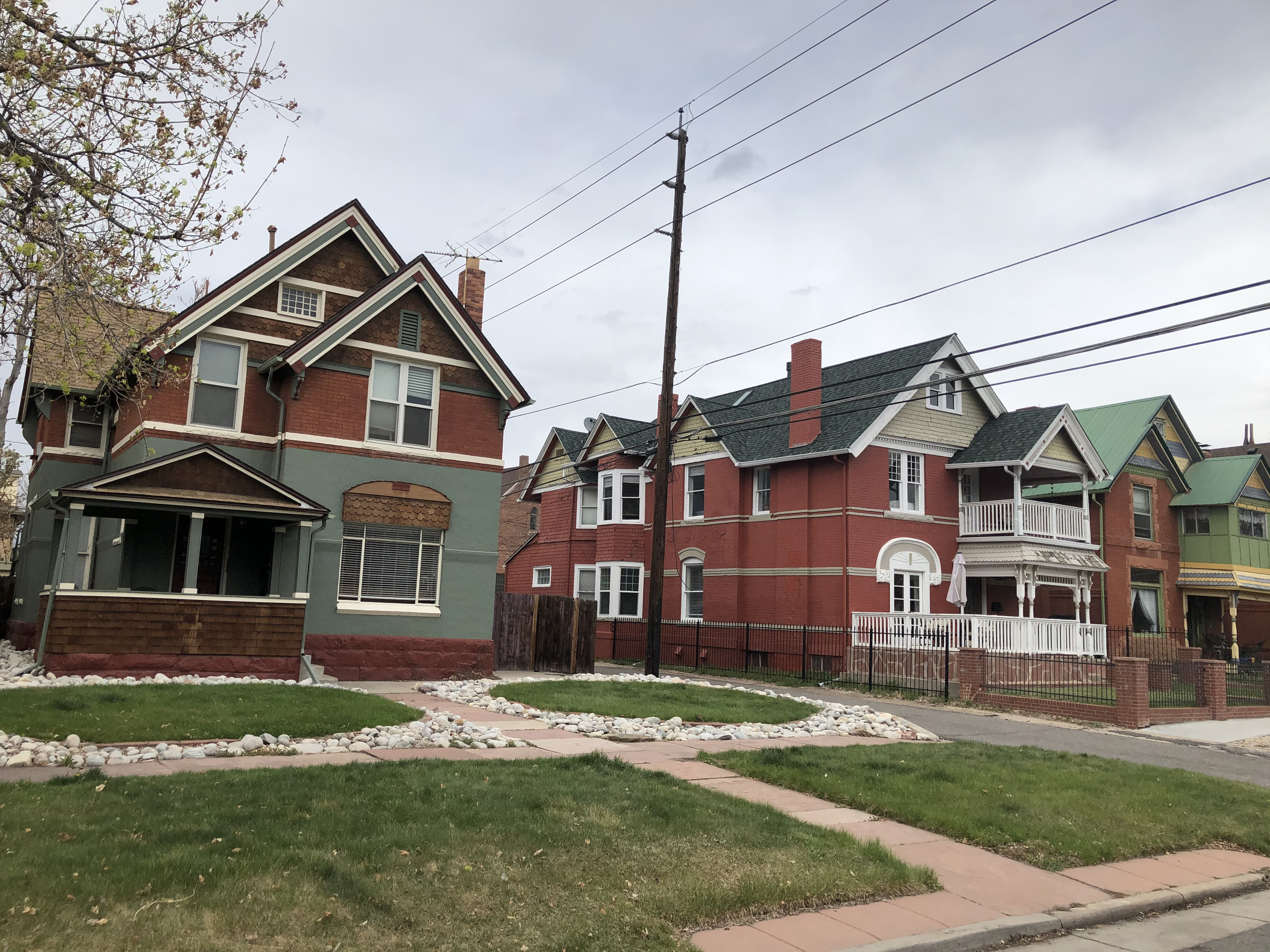
- Historic houses on W. Irvington Pl. between Bannock St. and Acoma St.

- Location within Colorado Location within the United States
- Location: Bounded by W. 5th Ave., Broadway, W. Alameda & Fox
- Coordinates: 39.7239°N 104.9952°W
- Area: 150 acres (0.61 km^{2})
- Architectural style: Bungalow/craftsman, Late Victorian, Terrace Style
- NRHP reference No.: 85002932
- CSRHP No.: 5DV.51
- Added to NRHP: October 3, 1985

Baker is a neighborhood in Denver, Colorado, United States.

== Geography ==
Baker is an area of 955 acres (3.86 km^{2}), approximately 1 mile (1.6 km) south of Denver Civic Center, generally defined by these boundaries: on the north by West 6th Avenue, on the east by Broadway, on the south by West Mississippi Avenue, and on the west by the South Platte River.

== Historic district ==
A historic district of 150 acres (0.61 km^{2}) (approximately 30 blocks) lies in the northeast corner of the neighborhood with irregular borders that range from within a half block of Alameda Ave. and Broadway on the south and east to as far as Fox St. on the west and W. 5th Ave. on the north. The historic district designation was granted in 2000 as Baker Historic District as part of the Historic Preservation effort of the City of Denver. Criteria for designation included historical figures who lived in the neighborhood and many popular architectural styles, with several buildings designed by prominent architects within a period of significance of 1873 to 1937. With small exceptions, the same area designated as a local historic district had been entered into the National Register of Historic Places as South Side–Baker Historic District in 1985. South Side is a name used in the 1880s for a larger area from Cherry Creek to Yale Ave., mostly east of Broadway.

In addition to the historic district, three individually-designated Denver Historic Landmark buildings are within Baker's boundaries: the Coyle/Chase House at 532 W. 4th Ave., home of playwright Mary Chase, the 1st and Broadway Building at 101-115 N. Broadway, and Fire Station No. 11 at 40 W. 2nd Ave.

== History ==
"John Smith and his Mexicans" settled for a while in the summer of 1857 at the outlet of a seasonal stream into the South Platte River, extracting enough placer gold to make this location profitable. The location became known as the Mexican Diggings. Since it preceded the 1858 settlement at the confluence of Cherry Creek and the South Platte River, about four miles downstream, it is thought to be the first non-native settlement of what is now Denver. The location has been established at approximately where W. Virginia Ave. would reach the east side of the S. Platte River.

James Beckwourth, a noted mountain man and former slave, settled in 1859 near the Mexican Diggings. Also that year, William and Elizabeth Byers homesteaded a nearby a portion of the riverfront. These were the first long-term non-native settlers in what became Baker. The first subdivision in Baker was platted along Santa Fe Dr. south of W. Sixth Ave. in 1872, and residential development took off in the 1880s. The part of the neighborhood north of Alameda Ave. was annexed into the city of Denver in 1883. Baker south of Alameda was within South Denver, incorporated in 1886 and then annexed to Denver in 1894.

The neighborhood includes hundreds of 19th century brick houses and 39 buildings by locally famous architect William Lang. More than 80 percent of the neighborhood was developed by 1900. In the 1970s the City of Denver named the neighborhood after Baker Junior High School (now Denver Center for International Studies at Baker) which had been named for turn of the 20th century University of Colorado president James Hutchins Baker, who never lived in the neighborhood.

== Character ==
In 2020, Baker had 6192 residents from a variety of racial, ethnic and socioeconomic backgrounds. Census racial categories of “race alone or in combination” were white 83.9%, Black or African American 5.9%, Native American 3.3%, Asian 4.8%, Native Hawaiian or other Asian Pacific Islander 0.3%, Other 13.3%. 17.9% of Baker residents identified as Hispanic or Latino. 6.8% of Baker residents were under 18 years old.

Baker's demographic makeup has changed significantly over the last two decades. In 2000, when Baker had 5810 residents, approximately 54% identified as Latino or Hispanic. In 2010, population had declined to 4879 and the Latino proportion was about 34%. From 2000 to 2010 the number of households had changed very little, increasing about 1%. From 2010 to 2020 Baker added 1228 housing units, mostly in the form of new apartment buildings, a trend that will continue with the planned redevelopments of Broadway Marketplace and Broadway Station.

The neighborhood is a mix of industrial, residential and commercial properties with the area along I-25 having an industrial character, the area along Broadway consisting mostly of commercial retail and offices, and north of Alameda between Santa Fe and Broadway making up the residential core. South of Alameda Ave. at Broadway is a large retail center with several big box stores. This area is undergoing mixed use redevelopment as "Broadway Park", and as of 2025 three apartment developments have been constructed. South of I-25 is the former Gates Rubber factory complex, site of a major redevelopment project which stalled in the late 2000s.

In 2025, two major sports stadium projects were announced at the south and north ends of Baker's west edge. At the south end of the neighborhood, a stadium for an expansion team of the National Women's Soccer League, Denver Summit FC, got final Denver City Council approval in December 2025. The team will build in the still-undeveloped Gates Rubber site, and plans to hold its first game there in 2028. Months after the Denver Summit project began its approval process, the Denver Broncos, working through the Walton-Penner Family Ownership Group, announced their intent to purchase the Burnham Yard, a decommissioned railroad maintenance facility in the La Alma/Lincoln Park and Baker neighborhoods, and surrounding properties to build a new Broncos stadium plus 5 to 7 million square feet of other development. As of early 2026, the project is still going through approval processes. While the stadium itself, planned to open in 2030, will be two blocks north of Baker, the properties be redeveloped, plus related changes to the transportation network, extend south of 6th Ave. into Baker.

Phil Milstein Park is the largest park within Baker, at 5.48 acres (2.22 hectares). It occupies the extreme northwest corner of Baker and is only accessible from outside the neighborhood. Within Baker's residential area are Dailey Park, at W. Ellsworth Ave. and S. Cherokee St. (2.66 acres (1.08 hectares)), and Hector M. Flores Park, at W. 4th Ave. and N. Galapago St. (0.36 acres (0.15 hectares)). Vanderbilt Park East (3.51 acres (1.42 hectares)) is an undeveloped designated park property adjacent to the Denver Summit FC stadium site within the Broadway Station redevelopment. Denver has set aside funds from the stadium project to rework existing plans and develop this park.

Baker is served by several bus lines and two light rail stations, Alameda station and I-25 & Broadway station.

== See also ==
- Denver–Aurora–Lakewood, CO Metropolitan Statistical Area
- Front Range Urban Corridor
- List of neighborhoods in Denver
- List of populated places in Colorado
