= Glen Huntington =

American architect

Glen Wood Huntington (1856-1943) was an American architect who practiced mainly in Denver, Colorado. A number of his works are listed on the National Register of Historic Places or designated as Denver Landmarks for their architecture.

He was born at Bunker Hill, Illinois, studied in Waterloo, New York, and first moved to Denver in the late 1870s. He opened a practice in Denver in 1888 but closed it during the financial crash of 1893. He reopened his practice when the depression was ending in 1897, and then practiced until 1938. His two sons Glen Herbert Huntington and Whitney Clark Huntington also became well known Colorado architects.

In his career Glen Wood Huntington specialized in, and is most known for, single-family home designs, in a variety of styles. These range from architectural revival styles (including Classical, Colonial, Tudor, and Renaissance) to then-modern Prairie Style. He also designed "upscale versions of the Foursquare and Bungalow." Further he designed at least three public structures in Denver: two fire stations and an addition to Berkeley School.

== Works ==
Huntington's works include:

- William Lamb House (1889), 2652 Lafayette St., Denver
- Higbee-Parker House (1889), 2622 Lafayette St., Denver
- Pierce T. Smith House (1891), 1751 Gilpin St., Denver, NRHP-listed
- 31 houses (1901-1926), on E. 7th Ave., Clarkson St., Columbine St,, Corona St., Detroit St., Downing St., Emerson St., Franklin St., Gaylord St., Gilpin St., High St., Lafayette St., Marion St., Vine St., Williams St. in Denver Landmarked E. 7th Ave. Historic District
- Curtis-Groves House (1903), 111 Humboldt St., in Denver Landmark Humboldt St. Historic District
- Two houses for Grace E. Smythe (1903), on Washington St., Denver, both demolished
- Nine houses on Washington St., Clarkson St., and Pearl St. (1905-1922), in Denver Landmarked Alamo Placita Historic District
- Eight houses on Vine St., E. 17th St., York St., and Williams (1905, and undated), in Denver Landmarked Wyman Historic District
- Fire Station No. 1 (1909), 1326 Tremont Pl., Denver (G.W. Huntington & Co.), NRHP-listed
- Fire Station No. 7 (1909), 3600 Tejon St., a Denver Landmark
- Arcanum Apartments (1907), 1904 Logan St., Denver, NRHP-listed
- Andrews-Wilson House, 180 Franklin St. (1910), and Barton-Fisher House, 314 Franklin (1913), in Denver Landmarked Country Club Historic District
- Milton House (1916), 3400 Federal Blvd., in Denver Landmarked Potter Highlands Historic District
- Berkeley School addition (1923), 5025-5055 Lowell Blvd., Denver, NRHP-listed
- Jacob VanEk-Eve Drewlowe House (1930), 626 13th St., Boulder, a Boulder Local Landmark

He also designed numerous other houses (1889, 1907, 1908, and undated) in Denver.
