= Neef House =

Neef House may refer to:

- Frederick W. Neef House, listed on the National Register of Historic Places {NRHP)
- Henry B. Neef House, in Minne Lusa neighborhood of North Omaha, Nebraska, NRHP-listed
