= Samsonite House =

Building in Denver, Colorado, US

Coordinates: 39°43′35″N 104°59′48″W

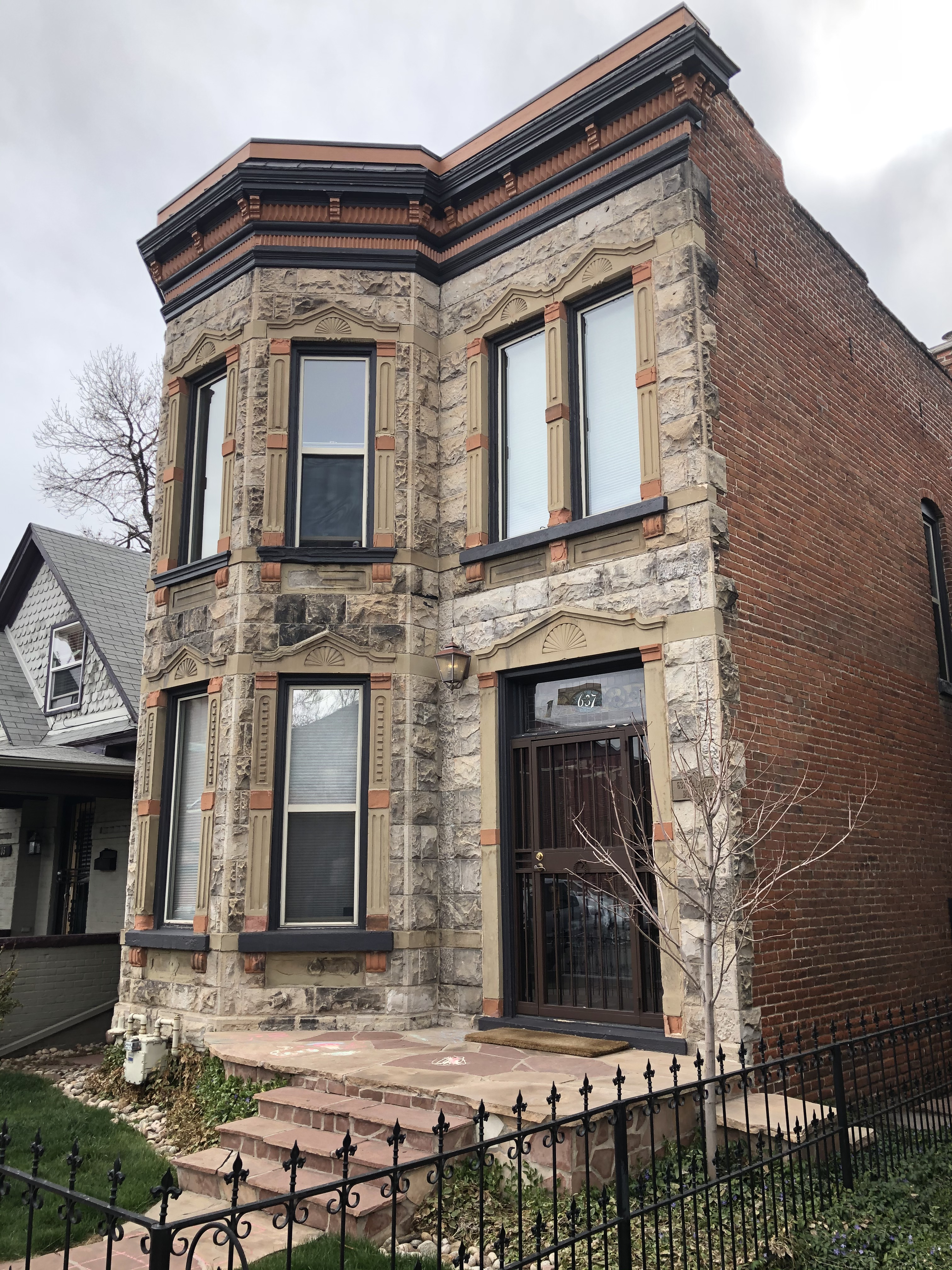
- Location: 637 Galapago Street, Lincoln Park, Denver, Colorado
- Built: 1890
- Architect: James J. Castillo (builder)
- Architectural style(s): Italianate style
- Owner: The Shwayder family, founders of Samsonite Corporation (1900–1921)

The Samsonite House is a historic house located in the neighborhood of Lincoln Park in Denver, Colorado. The home on Galapago Street is representative of the Italianate style of architecture, with a flat-roof cornice and tall narrow windows. It first was a rectory for the St. Joseph's Roman Catholic Church and was then owned by the Shwayder family, founders of Samsonite Corporation.

The Samsonite House received historic designation as a Denver Landmark by the Denver City Council on February 12, 2019. (Note: The private residence was submitted for historic designation to the Denver Landmark Office on November 19, 2018. The house was covered in local news media following the landmarking announcement.)

== History ==
The two-story house was built in 1890 by the builder James J. Castillo, and originally served as a rectory for St. Joseph's Roman Catholic Church across the street.

The house was bought and sold several times by January 18, 1900, when it was purchased by Solomon Shwayder, son of Isaac and Raechel Shwayder, from Edward T. Jones. Solomon sold the property to his mother Rachael Leah (Kobey) Shwayder 17 months later on July 1, 1901. (Note: During that time, Jesse Shwayder helped transition his father Isaac’s luggage shop into the Shwayder Trunk Manufacturing Co. The company later changed its name to Samsonite after its best-selling suitcase, which was named after the Biblical strongman Samson. The Shwayder family sold Samsonsite in 1973, and the company has gone through multiple ownership changes since. The company closed its Denver manufacturing facility, which once employed about 4,000 people, in 2001, and moved its main office out of Denver more than a decade ago.) Rachael Shwayder raised her family in the home and sold it in 1921.
