= Denver Firefighters Museum =

- Fire Station No. 1
- U.S. National Register of Historic Places
- Colorado State Register of Historic Properties
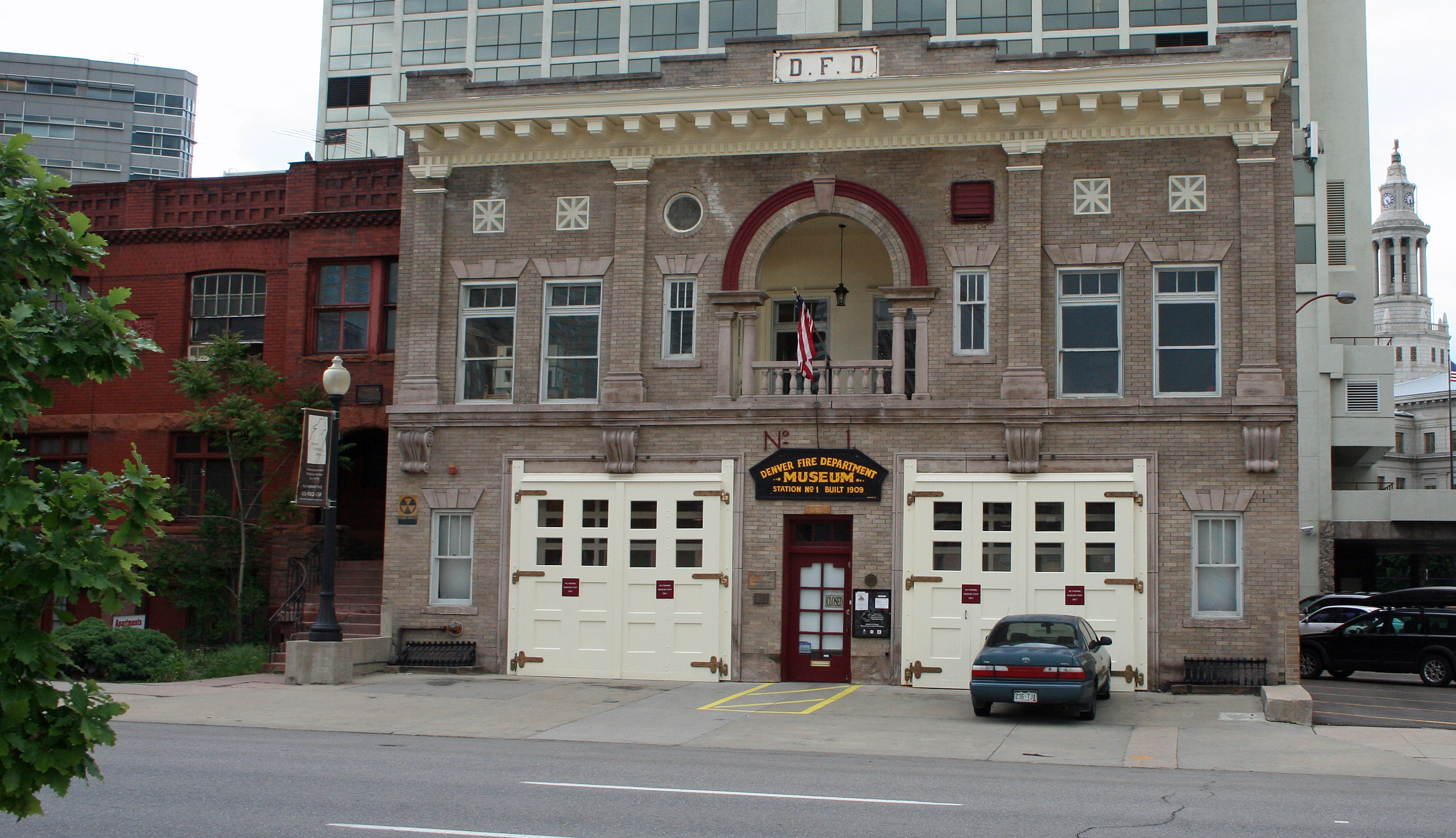
- Front of the museum

- Location within Colorado Location within the United States
- Location: 1326 Tremont Pl., Denver, Colorado
- Coordinates: 39.74062°N 104.99241°W
- Built: 1909
- Architect: G.W. Huntington & Co.
- Website: http://www.denverfirefightersmuseum.org/
- NRHP reference No.: 79000586
- CSRHP No.: 5DV.152
- Added to NRHP: November 14, 1979

The Denver Firefighters Museum is a museum in downtown Denver, Colorado, United States. A nonprofit institution 501 (C) (3), it consists of an 11,000-square-foot (1,000 m^{2}) facility housing four galleries that explore the history of firefighting in Denver. Established in 1978, it is located in the 1909-built former Fire Station No. 1, a building that is a Denver Landmark and has been listed on the National Register of Historic Places.

== Fire Station No. 1 ==
The Denver Firefighters Museum is located in a historic firehouse, Historic Station No. 1, built in 1909 by the Denver architect Glen W. Huntington. Historic Station One is actually the second station one. The original Station One was located at the corner of 15th Street and Broadway. It was torn down in 1909 to make way for The Pioneer Monument which was constructed in 1910 for $70,000 to mark the western terminus of the Smokey Hill Trail and honor the pioneers who crossed the plains. The new Station One was constructed for a cost $20,000 in 1909.

It was designated a Denver Landmark in 1974, and was listed on the National Register of Historic Places in 1979.

== Funding ==
The Denver Firefighters Museum is a nonprofit institution with revenues from contributions and grants from individuals, foundations, corporations and federal agencies; earned gift shop income; program income; memberships and admission income.

The Denver Firefighters Museum employs four full-time and five part-time staff members. Over 100 volunteers donate more than 3,500 hours annually to a variety of museum projects.

== Visitor demographics ==
The Denver Firefighters Museum welcomes more than 20,000 visitors each year with over 5,000 at reduced or free admission through the Scientific & Cultural Facilities District (SCFD) free days and community partnerships. A large proportion of the Museum visitors are out of state firefighters and their families. The Museum receives many international visitors as well. The outside of the museum is featured on many of Denver's Architectural tours because of its public art.

== Collections ==
The Denver Firefighters Museum maintains a collection of more than 30,000 artifacts, photographs and manuscripts.

=== Main Level Gallery ===
Six themes comprise this gallery that follows the process of fire. Communicating Fire—discuss how fire has been communicated through time from pulling alarm boxes and telegraph, to dialing zero and calling 911 today; Personal Protective Tools and Equipment—display of bunking gear, helmets, boots, and firefighting tools; Fire Apparatus—display of hand pulled, horse pulled and motorized fire trucks and engines; Fire Suppression—discussion of methods used to extinguish fire through water and chemicals; Other Duties—discusses other life safety tasks that firefighters perform; and an interpretation of the History of Station No. 1. Follow the firefighters boot prints through the gallery to interact with the hands-on activities. Fire Safety Stops explore the exhibit themes on a child's level and teach important fire prevention lessons in a fun, non-threatening manner. Activities include a 911 teaching phone, child size firefighting gear, children's pole and fire truck, and a touch cart full of real firefighting tools. Discount Tire Co. Educational Center shows a variety of videos on demand.

=== Second Floor Gallery ===
Three themes comprise this gallery: firefighter training, Denver's fires and living quarters at Station No. 1. Visitors learn of the rigors of becoming a firefighter; the large fires in Denver's history; and tour the living quarters—dorm room, officer's quarters, locker room, bathroom, and family room.

=== Children’s Gallery ===
This gallery is designed just for families to interact one-on-one with their children. The concepts presented reinforce the fire prevention messages gleaned through the tour of the exhibits and include computer kiosks, puppet theater, reading center, video center, and a hop scotch that teaches matches and lighter safety

== See also ==
- Fire Museum
