= Denver Center for International Studies at Baker =

DCIS Baker
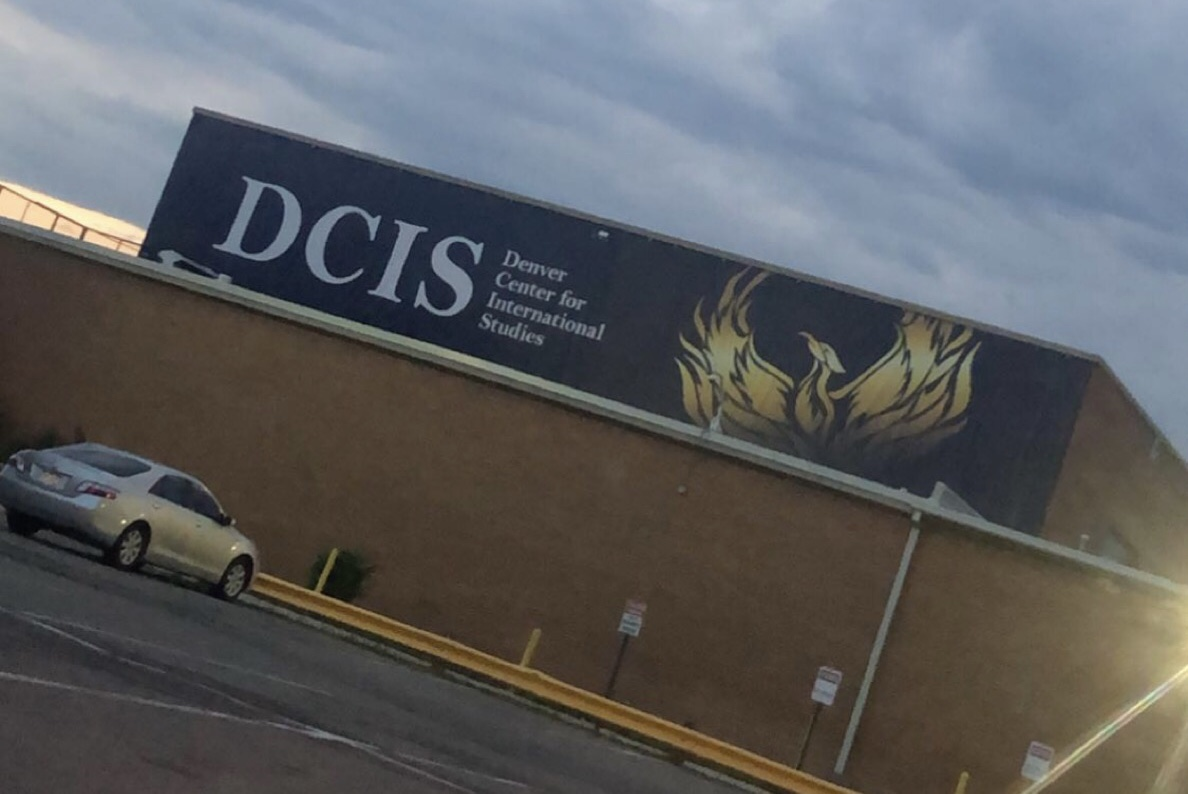
- DCIS Baker in 2020.

Location
- 574 W. Sixth Ave; Denver, Colorado 80204; United States
- Coordinates: 39.7253°N 104.9943°W

Information
- Type: Public Magnet School
- Established: 2006
- School district: Denver Public Schools
- Principal: Marisa Vasquez
- Grades: 6–12
- Colors: Blue & green
- Mascot: Phoenix
- Website: dcis.dpsk12.org

Denver Center for International Studies at Baker, or simply DCIS Baker, is a public 6-12 magnet school located in the Baker neighborhood of Denver, Colorado. It is part of the Denver Public Schools system. DCIS was created in 1985 as a magnet program at Denver West High School and became an independent magnet middle and high school in 2006 at the Baker location.

== History ==
Dr. Dan Lutz created the concept of an internationally focused school at Denver West High School as a magnet program in 1985. The core idea of the program centered around a globally-focused curriculum that would offer multiple languages and opportunities to travel and experience other cultures. At Denver West High School, the program was originally named the Center for International Studies. In 1997, the DCIS Foundation was established as a 501(c)(3) organization to raise funds to make travel more accessible for a growing and diverse student population.

In 2006, the DCIS program relocated from Denver West High School to nearby vacant Baker Middle School. The building was renovated to meet the needs of the new school, and the doors of DCIS Baker opened for students in fall 2006.

The Denver Public Schools Board of Education later expanded the DCIS network to three other campuses: two elementary schools (DCIS Ford and DCIS Fairmont) and another 6-12 school (DCIS Montbello). These DCIS schools are the only DPS members of the International Studies Schools Network (ISSN), which is part of the Asia Society.

On March 4, 2016, the school was evacuated after an individual called 911 and falsely claimed that they had placed bombs in the school. Tactical teams and bomb-sniffing dogs were brought in, and no explosive devices were found in or near the school. Classes were cancelled for the remainder of the day.

== Demographics ==
As of the 2021–2022 school year, DCIS Baker has a total enrollment of 672 students in grades six through twelve.

- Hispanic/Latino: 62%
- White: 23%
- African American/Black: 5%
- Asian & Pacific Islander: 4%
- Multiple Races: 3%
- American Indian: 2%
- Unspecified: 1%

Low-Income Students: 61%

== Athletics ==
The athletic teams of DCIS Baker are known as the Phoenix. The school fields a variety of sports for middle school students, but does not offer any high school athletics due to a lack of facilities.

Due to the school's history and proximity to Denver West High School, high school student athletes at DCIS Baker are able to join West's athletic teams. DCIS Baker students account for approximately 20% of West's athletic rosters.
