= Lincoln Park, Denver =

Coordinates: 39°44′06″N 105°00′14″W

Lincoln Park
- Neighborhood
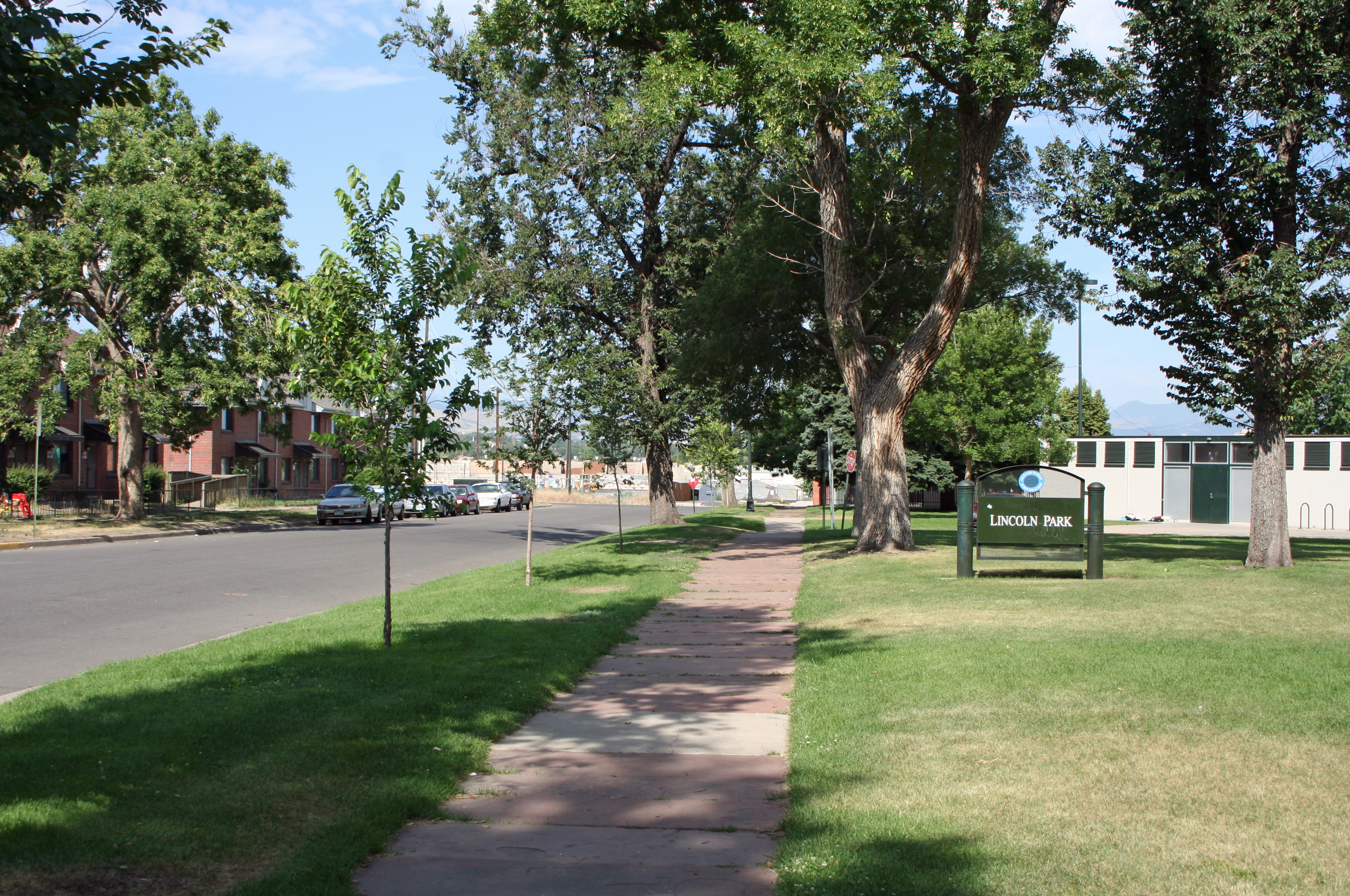
- The park from where the neighborhood is named
- Interactive map of Lincoln Park
- Country: United States of America
- State: Colorado
- City: Denver

Population (2010)
  - Total: 6,119
- ZIP Codes: 80204

Lincoln Park is a neighborhood and public park close to downtown Denver, Colorado and the location of the Art District on Santa Fe. The neighborhood is one of Denver's oldest and is just to the south of the area where Denver was first settled in the 1850s. Many houses date from about 1900. The neighborhood is sometimes called "La Alma/Lincoln Park" or considered part of the Westside.

== Geography ==
The boundaries of the neighborhood are 6th Avenue at the south end, West Colfax Avenue at the northern end, Cherry Creek on the east side and the South Platte River on the west side. Interstate 25 runs north–south through the western part of the neighborhood.

Housing in the neighborhood includes many single family detached houses, including two-story brick Victorians, row houses, duplexes, brick bungalows and one-story stucco houses. Prominent housing developments include the Parkway Center apartment and condominium complex, with 1,050 units, at 12th and Galapago Street, Denver Tower Complex with condos, supermarket and offices (both fronting on Speer Boulevard from 14th to 12th).

The North Lincoln Park public housing facility, completed in 1996, replaced a dilapidated housing complex built in the 1950s. A more extensive update is planned for the remaining South Lincoln Park Homes starting in 2010, using a grant from the American Recovery and Reinvestment Act. This new project will create 900 units of mixed-income housing, and provide space for an open-air farmer's market.

== Demographics ==
Based on data from 2000 for the combined Auraria and Lincoln Park neighborhoods, the racial makeup of the neighborhood is 32.38% White, 7.23% African American, 3.97% Asian, 1.51% Native American. Hispanic or Latino of any race is 52.47% of the population. The crime rate and poverty rate are also much higher than city and national averages. The crime rate is 196 incidents per 1,000 people and a poverty rate of 37.64%.

== Arts and culture ==
Institutions in the neighborhood include Museo de las Americas on Santa Fe Drive, the region's first museum dedicated to the art and culture of Latinos; Center for Visual Art, Metropolitan State University of Denver's contemporary art gallery and learning lab; Denver Health hospital complex; Denver West High School, the Asian and Hispanic Chambers of Commerce; the Buckhorn Exchange, established in 1893, holds the state's first liquor license; and Sunken Gardens Park along Speer Boulevard. A former courthouse and district attorney's office at the intersection of Speer Boulevard and Colfax Avenue was renovated into a Latino cultural and business center. Venerable Boulder, Colorado based community radio station KGNU opened a studio at 7th and Kalamath in 2006, when they began broadcasting in Denver on 1390 AM, located together with noncommercial media partner, Open Media Foundation.

The Denver Civic Theater on Santa Fe Drive was opened in 1921 as a cinema house, one of Denver's first silent movie theaters. The building was later used for various purposes (even as a meatpacking plant), before it was eventually renovated in 1993 as a neighborhood arts center containing two theaters (one with 332 seats, another with 134) and an art gallery. The venue has been used by local playwrights and a resident performance company for dramatic productions, and in 2010 became the new home of Su Teatro.

Within the neighborhood is Lincoln Park itself, located at Mariposa St. and West 11th Avenue. The park has a basketball court, outdoor pool, recreation center, softball field, grass infield, lighted softball field, tennis court, and a sand volleyball court. Across from the park is the Denver Inner City Parish, a grassroots, humans services non-profit agency providing community services, including a food pantry, basic necessities, seniors programming, and La Academia, their school for at-risk youth, to area residents since 1960.

Denver's Art District on Santa Fe between 6th and 12th Avenues (its primary retail and commercial corridor), includes more than 40 galleries, restaurants and shops. The "First Friday Art Walk" and the "Collectors' Night" are monthly events in the district.

== Transportation ==
The RTD's light rail line runs north–south through the neighborhood and includes a station located at 10th Avenue and Osage Street.

== Historic places in Lincoln Park ==
- Buckhorn Exchange - Denver's oldest restaurant, a historic old-west steakhouse. 1000 Osage Street, added to National Register on April 21, 1983
- John "Thunderbird Man" Emhoolah Jr. Branch Library - 675 Santa Fe Drive
- Midwest Steel & Iron Works - 25 Larimer Street - added April 10, 1985
- Samsonite House - the historic home of the Shwayder family (1900–1921) who founded the Samsonite Luggage Corporation. 637 Galapago Street. Added to Denver landmark registry February 12, 2019.
- Smith's Chapel (Denver Inner City Parish) - 912 Galapago Street. Added to Colorado State Registry December 8, 2004.
- St. Joseph's Roman Catholic Church (Denver) - 600 Galapago Street - added June 3, 1982
- Sunken Gardens - Roughly bounded by Speer Boulevard, W. 8th Ave., Delaware, and Elati Sts. - added September 17, 1986
- West High School - 951 Elati Street
- Westside Courthouse Building - 924 West Colfax Avenue, added May 5, 2004

== See also ==
- Bibliography of Colorado
- Geography of Colorado
- History of Colorado
- Index of Colorado-related articles
- List of Colorado-related lists
  - List of neighborhoods in Denver
  - List of populated places in Colorado
- Outline of Colorado
