= Emmanuel Shearith Israel Chapel =

Chapel and art gallery in Colorado, US

- U.S. National Register of Historic Places
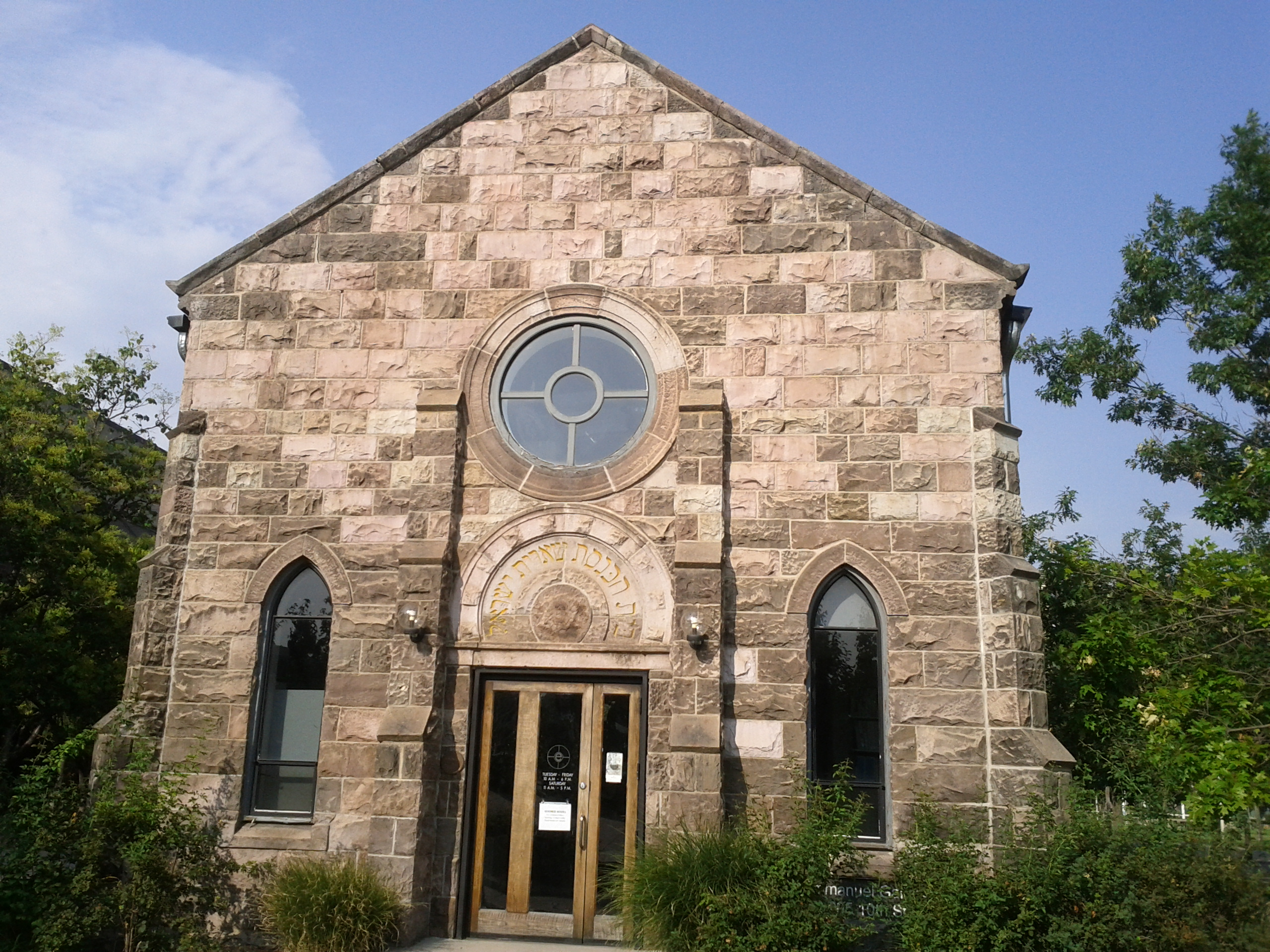

- Location within Colorado Location within the United States
- Location: 1201 10th St., Denver, Colorado, United States
- Coordinates: 39°44′39″N 105°0′12″W
- Area: 0.3 acres (0.12 ha)
- Built: 1876
- NRHP reference No.: 69000041
- Added to NRHP: December 1, 1969

The Emmanuel Gallery is an art gallery and historic building at 1205 10th Street in Denver, Colorado, United States, on the Auraria Campus.

The gallery is housed in Denver's oldest surviving church building and is listed on the National Register of Historic Places as Emmanuel Shearith Israel Chapel. It was built in 1876 as an Episcopal church, on the site of a Sunday School building that was erected in 1859. In 1903, it was bought by the Shearith Israel congregation and converted to serve as a Jewish synagogue, which it was until 1958.

It was the first official Denver landmark established by ordnance of Denver's city council, on January 10, 1968.

The building was listed on the National Register of Historic Places in 1969.

It has served as an art gallery since 1973.
