= August Schomburg =

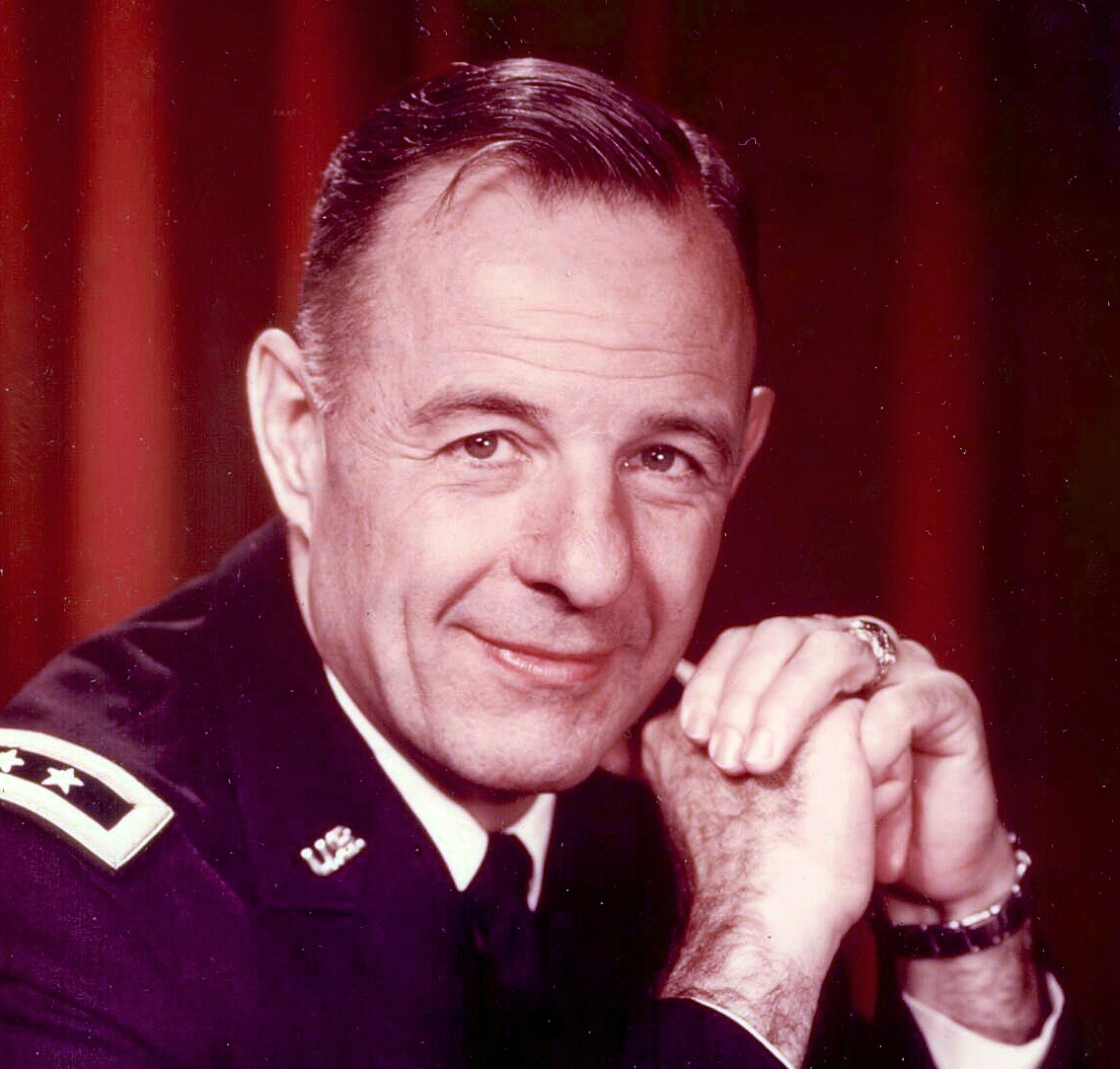
- Born: July 3, 1908; Denver, Colorado
- Died: January 14, 1972 (aged 63); Phoenix, Arizona
- Burial place: Arlington National Cemetery
- Education: Colorado School of Mines; United States Military Academy
- Military career
- Allegiance: United States of America
- Branch: United States Army
- Service years: 1931–1967
- Rank: Lieutenant General
- Commands: Commandant, Industrial College of the Armed Forces
- Awards: Distinguished Service Medal; Legion of Merit (2); Army Commendation Medal (2)

Lieutenant General (Ret.) August Schomburg (July 3, 1908 – January 14, 1972) was the Commander of the United States Army Ballistic Missile Command, and later Commandant of the Industrial College of the Armed Forces. He retired from Active Duty military service in 1967, and died in 1972. He is buried at Arlington National Cemetery. His wife Fern Wynne Schomburg died in 1996.

== Biography ==
=== Education ===
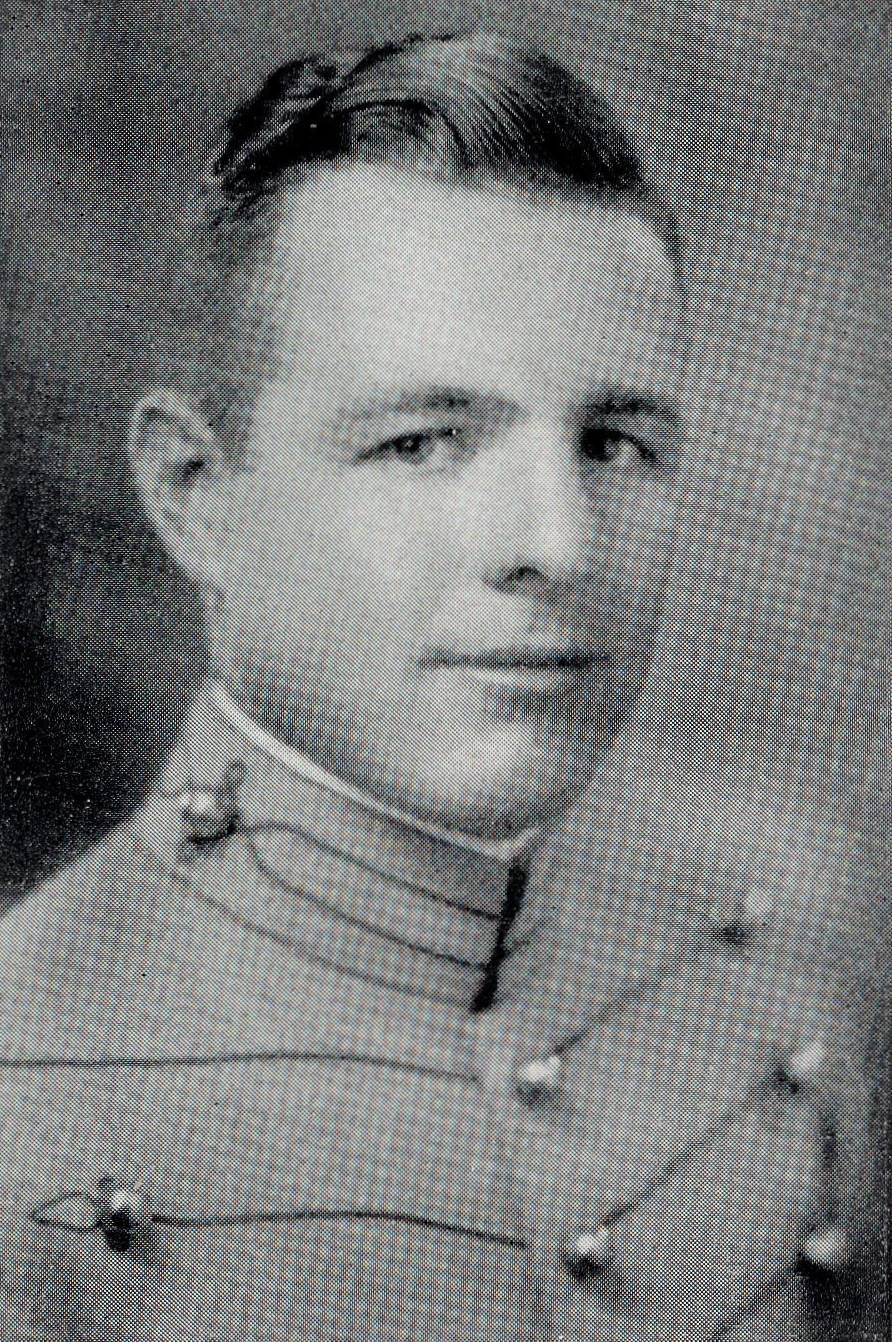
Schomburg as a United States Military Academy cadet c. 1931

August Schomburg was born in Denver, Colorado, on July 3, 1908. Following graduation from Denver's West High School in 1926, he attended the Colorado School of Mines for a year before entering the U. S. Military Academy at West Point. He was graduated from the West Point on June 11, 1931, with a degree in Military Science and was commissioned a Second Lieutenant of Infantry in the Regular Army.

=== Work ===
During the early years of his military career he served various Infantry assignments. In 1937 he transferred to Ordnance and attended the Massachusetts Institute of Technology, receiving his Master of Science degree in Mechanical Engineering. He attended the Ordnance School at Aberdeen Proving Ground, Maryland, and remained at the Proving Ground serving successively as Adjutant before going to the staff of the Ordnance Research and Development Center for tours as Chief, Small Arms Section; Executive Officer, Proving Center and Commanding Officer of the Ordnance Winter Proving Center in Canada.

In April 1944 he was called to the War Department General Staff, where he was assigned to G-3 until February 1946. The following three years he spent at Ottawa, Canada as Assistant Military Attaché, U. S. Embassy, and Liaison Officer with the Canadian Army.

In September 1949 he was assigned to Watertown Arsenal, Watertown, Massachusetts, where he remained until July 29, 1952, as Director of Research, Development and Engineering. The following year he spent as a student at the Industrial College of the Armed Forces, Fort McNair, Washington, D.C., graduating in June 1953. He was named Chief, Procurement Branch, G-4, Logistics, for United States Army in Europe, in 1953, with headquarters at Heidelberg, Germany. On July 30, 1953, he was promoted from colonel to brigadier general.

On April 27, 1956, General Schomburg was appointed Chief, Research and Development Division, Office, Chief of Ordnance. General Schomburg became Deputy Chief of Ordnance on May 2, 1958. He commanded the U.S. Army Ordnance Missile Command at Redstone Arsenal, predecessor to the U.S. Army Missile Command (later merged with the U.S. Army Aviation and Troop Command to form the U.S. Army Aviation and Missile Command in 1997), where he worked with Dr. Wernher von Braun in the development of the Nike-Zeus and Hercules class missile systems from February 1960 to May 24, 1962. He assisted with the official transfer of authority of the Army Ballistic Missile Agency (ABMA) to the NASA George C. Marshall Space Flight Center (MSFC) on July 1, 1960. General Schomburg later served as Commandant of the Industrial College of the Armed Forces at Fort McNair prior to his retirement in 1967. He died in January 1972 and was buried in Arlington National Cemetery. He was inducted into the Ordnance Corps Hall of Fame in 1985.

=== Awards ===
Lieutenant General Schomburg was awarded the Distinguished Service Medal, the Legion of Merit with Oak Leaf Cluster and the Army Commendation Medal with Oak Leaf Cluster.

- Army Distinguished Service Medal
- Defense Distinguished Service Medal
- Legion of Merit with one oak leaf cluster
- Army Commendation Medal
