= West High School (Denver, Colorado) =

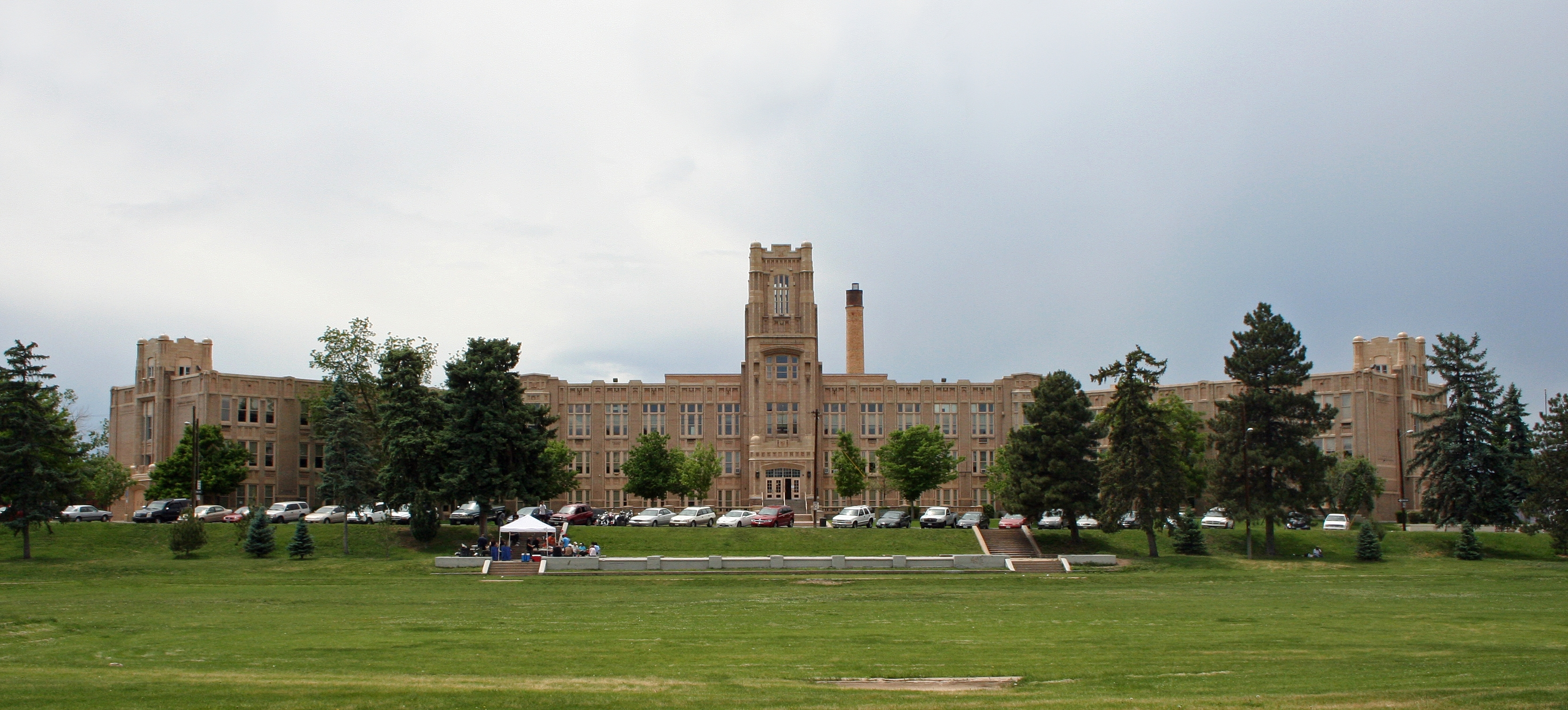

Location
- 951 Elati Street; Denver, Colorado 80204-3939; United States; 39.7319°N 104.9952°W

Information
- Type: Public
- Established: 1883 (143 years ago)
- School district: Denver Public Schools
- CEEB code: 060460
- Principal: Mia Martinez Lopez
- Staff: 46.06 (FTE)
- Grades: 9–12
- Student to teacher ratio: 12.22
- Colors: Orange and black
- Athletics: 3A (2A football)
- Mascot: Cowboys
- Website: west.dpsk12.org

West High School, commonly referred to as Denver West High School or simply D-West, is a historic high school located in the Lincoln Park neighborhood of the original section of West Denver, Colorado. It is part of the Denver Public Schools system. It is one of four original high schools in Denver; the other three are East, North, and South.

== History ==
West High School was organized in 1883. On June 13, 1884, at 2:00PM, Charles McDonough, Effie Hallam, Lelia Williams, Frances Brandt, Laura Duccy, and Morrison Stillwell became the first graduates of West High School. In 1902, after merging with School District No. 1 (East) to become Denver Public Schools, West became the district's "second" high school. In 1926, West moved into its current building at 9th and Elati, a building designed in English gothic style and executed in light brick with buff terra cotta trimmings. It contains spacious halls and numerous academic, scientific, and vocational classrooms.

West High School has a history of activism. In 1969, Chicano students organized walkouts and marches against the racism and discrimination they experienced in the classroom in protests known as the "West High Blowout". Walkouts occurred throughout Denver as students from other high schools across the city joined in.

In 2012, West High School split into two smaller schools — West Early College and West Leadership Academy — in an attempt to boost academic scores. The two schools shared the same building and remained unified for extracurriculars such as athletics, but academically broke into two schools.

It has a 1,082-seat auditorium that underwent a complete state-of-the-art renovation in 2014 (over 1,200 seats prior to renovation), and a gymnasium that seats 2,000.

In 2021, The Denver Public Schools Board of Education approved reunifying West Early College and West Leadership Academy into West High School beginning in the 2021–2022 school year. Students and staff advocated for reunification in efforts to embrace the school's history and end what some saw as a rivalry between the two small schools. West High School also houses West Middle School, a middle school of about 475 students within the same building as the high school.

== Demographics ==
As of the 2020–2021 school year, West High School has a total enrollment of 771 students.

Percentage Minority Students: 96%

- Hispanic/Latino: 84.9%
- African American/Black: 7.8%
- White: 4%
- Asian & Pacific Islander: 1.1%
- American Indian: 1.1%
- Multiple Races: 1.1%

== Athletics ==
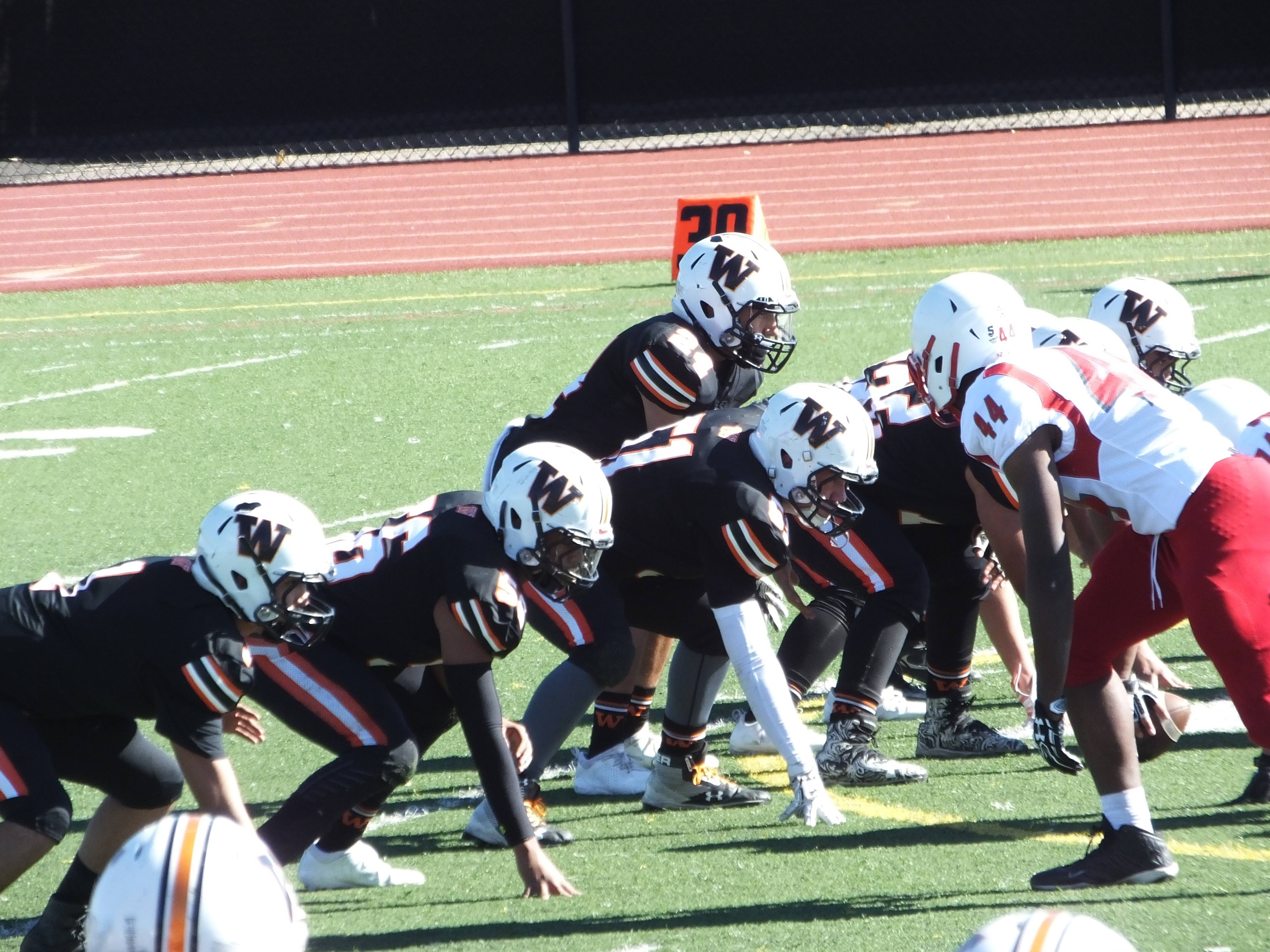
Denver West's football team during a 2018 game against Arvada High School

The athletic teams of West High School are known as the Cowboys (and Cowgirls, for women's sports). The school competes in multiple athletic divisions - the 2A Colorado division for football, and the 5A/4A/3A mixed Denver Prep division (comprising mostly DPS teams) for all other sports. As of 2021, the athletic director is Leon Garcia, who is also the head football coach.

Because of the urban location of West High School, their athletic teams welcome student athletes from nearby alternative high schools and schools too small to field their own teams, such as nearby DCIS Baker, whose student athletes account for about 20 percent of West High School's rosters.

== Notable alumni ==
- Mary Chase - playwright
- Katherine M. Cook - educator, public official
- William Edward Doyle - judge
- Bill Frank - former NFL and CFL player
- Jordon Perlmutter, real estate developer
- August Schomburg, Commander of the United States Army Ballistic Missile Command
- Alpha Diallo, NBA player
