= Buckhorn Exchange =

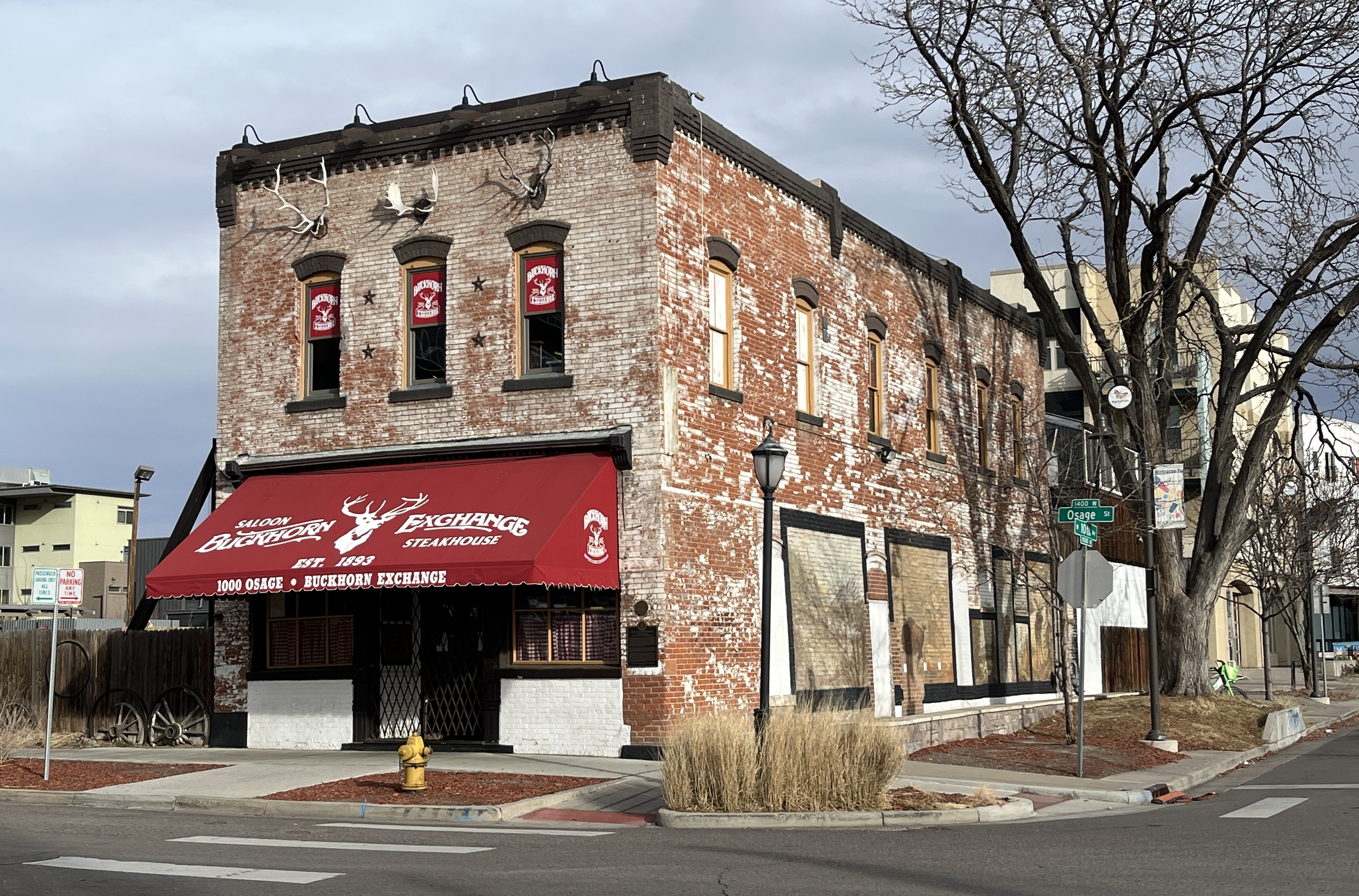
- The restaurant's exterior, 2025
- Interactive map of Buckhorn Exchange

Restaurant information
- Established: November 17, 1893; 132 years ago
- Owner: Buckhorn Associates
- Food type: Steakhouse
- Location: 1000 Osage St., Denver, City and County of Denver, Colorado, 80204, United States
- Website: www.buckhorn.com

- Zeitz Buckhorn Exchange
- U.S. National Register of Historic Places
- Location within Colorado
- Coordinates: 39°43′56″N 105°00′58″W
- Area: 0.3 acres (0.12 ha)
- Built: 1886
- NRHP reference No.: 83001292
- Added to NRHP: April 21, 1983

The Buckhorn Exchange is a historic landmark restaurant and American frontier museum located in Lincoln Park, Denver, Colorado. The restaurant opened in 1893 and is the oldest continuously operating restaurant in Denver.

It was listed on the National Register of Historic Places in 1983 as the Zeitz Buckhorn Exchange.

== History ==
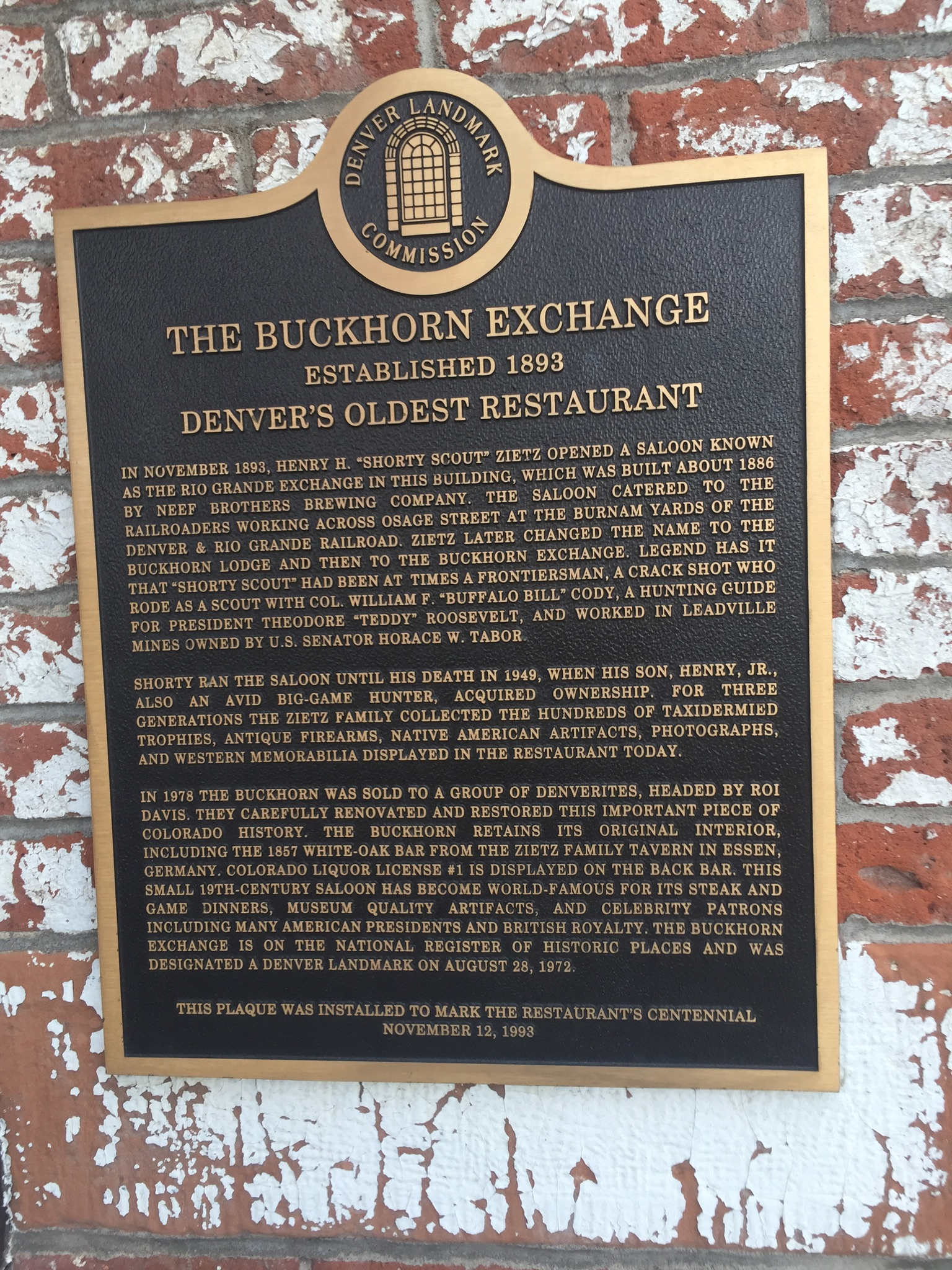
Plaque outside of Buckhorn Exchange

Buckhorn Exchange was established on November 17, 1893, as a saloon called "The Rio Grande Exchange" by American scout, Henry H. "Shorty Scout" Zietz. Around 1886, the building was constructed by Neef Brothers Brewing Company. Zietz was friends with Buffalo Bill and Sitting Bull who called him "Shorty Scout" due to his small physique. Zietz was considered a lifelong friend to the Indians. The saloon catered toward railroaders, cattlemen, miners, gamblers, businessmen and Indian chiefs.

Theodore Roosevelt dined at the restaurant in 1905 after his Presidential Express train arrived at the Rio Grande rail yards. Roosevelt and Zietz went big-game hunting on Colorado's western slope. The restaurant contains over "500 mounted animals and trophy heads of every description", including an "African Cape Buffalo shot by President Teddy Roosevelt". As of 2018, five presidents have dined at Buckhorn Exchange.

The Daily Meal on Fox News ranked Buckhorn Exchange as one of the oldest operating restaurants in the United States, stating the restaurant received the first liquor license in the state of Colorado.

Buckhorn's is currently owned by Bill Dutton.

== Menu ==
Buckhorn Exchange is a steakhouse and is known for its Rocky Mountain oysters.

== See also ==
- List of the oldest restaurants in the United States
- National Register of Historic Places
- National Register of Historic Places listings in Denver
- List of restaurants in Denver
- List of steakhouses
