= Christ Methodist Episcopal Church =

Historic church in Colorado, United States

- U.S. National Register of Historic Places
- Colorado State Register of Historic Properties
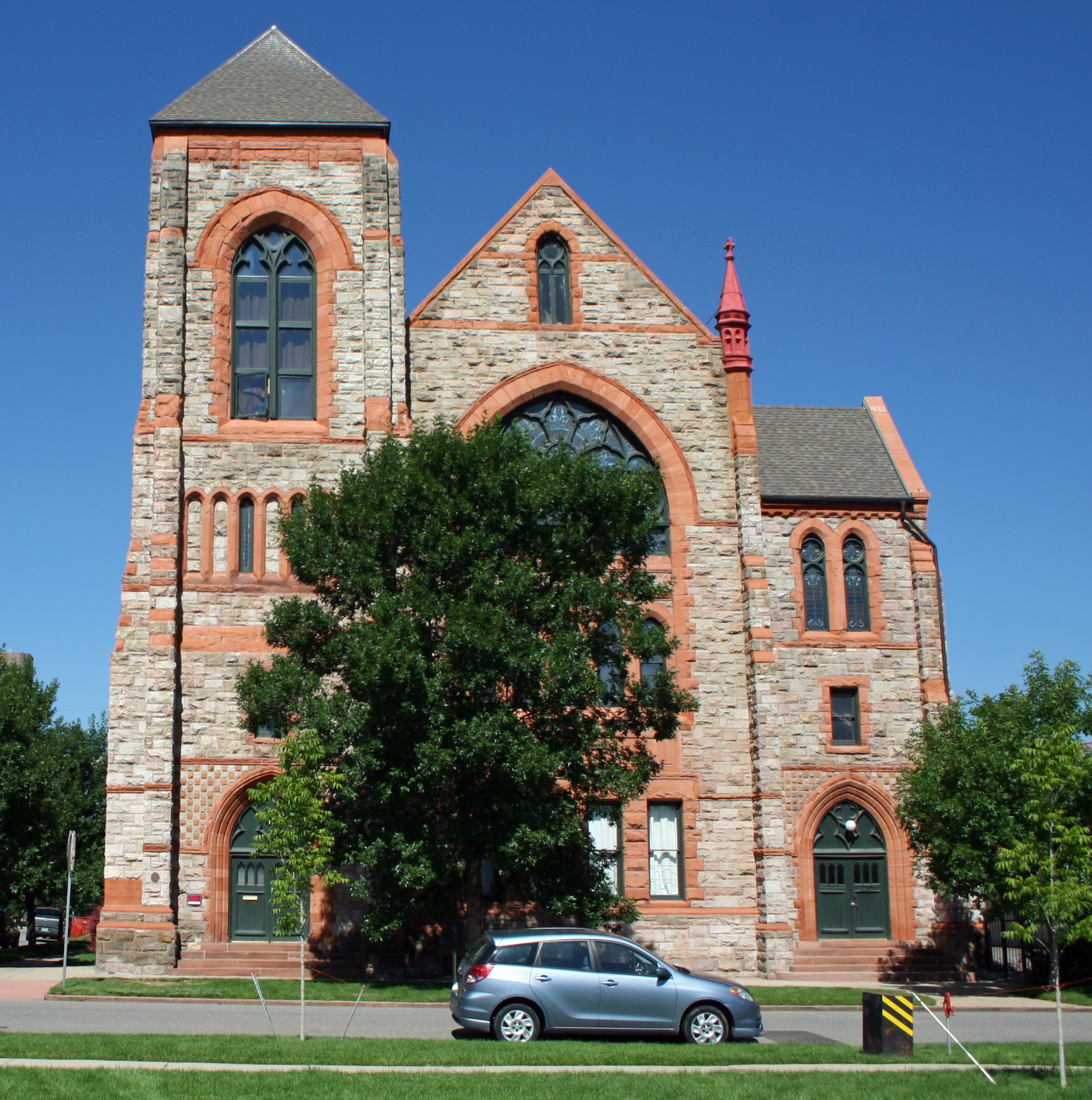

- Location within Colorado Location within the United States
- Location: 2201 Ogden St., Denver, Colorado
- Coordinates: 39°44′59″N 104°58′28″W
- Area: less than one acre
- Built: 1889
- Architect: Kidder, Frank Eugene; Ackroyd, E.
- Architectural style: Gothic
- NRHP reference No.: 76000549
- CSRHP No.: 5DV.127
- Added to NRHP: November 7, 1976

The Christ Methodist Episcopal Church in Denver, Colorado, also known as Scott Methodist Episcopal Church, is a historic church at 2201 Ogden Street. It was built in 1889 and was added to the National Register in 1976.

It is a two-story 74 by 90 feet (23 m × 27 m) plan building.

It was purchased by an African American congregation in 1927 and renamed for a pioneer black Methodist bishop. After this congregation moved to a different location, the church was rehabilitated as Sanctuary Lofts in 1995.
