= St. Joseph's Roman Catholic Church (Denver) =

Historic church in Colorado, United States

- St. Joseph's Roman Catholic Parish in Denver
- U.S. National Register of Historic Places
- Colorado State Register of Historic Properties
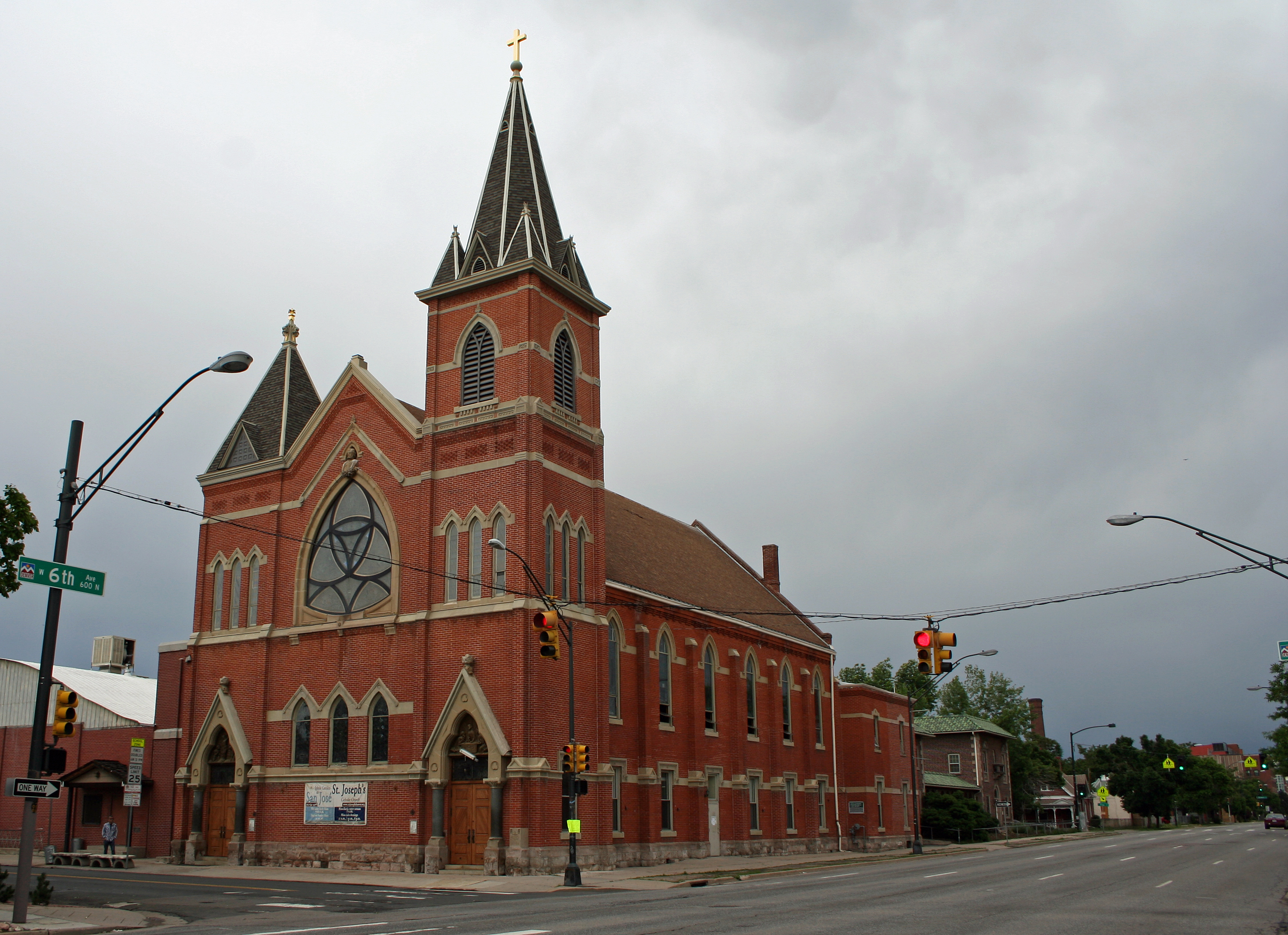

- Location within Colorado Location within the United States
- Location: 600 Galapago, Denver, Colorado
- Coordinates: 39°43′34″N 104°59′44″W
- Area: less than one acre
- Built: 1888
- Architectural style: Gothic
- NRHP reference No.: 82002295
- CSRHP No.: 5DV.25
- Added to NRHP: June 3, 1982

St. Joseph's Roman Catholic Church of Denver, also known as St. Joseph's Redemptorist Church, is a historic church at 600 Galapago in Denver, Colorado. It was built in 1888 and was added to the National Register of Historic Places in 1982.

The church was deemed significant in part "as an example of the style of institutional architecture which was predominant in Denver during the 1880s - 90s. The architecture takes on greater significance because of one feature of the building—the stained glass windows. All of them are American-made, an apparently unusual circumstance for the time, as the common conception of the people at the time St. Joseph's was built was that church windows had to be imported from Europe. The stained glass windows are also unique in that they contain clear prisms."

St Joseph's was the site of a mass excommunication of more than 100 parishioners, after it was found that Father Malone had embezzled a large sum of money. 637 Galapago (also known as the Samsonite house), across the street from the church was built for the sum of $12,000 in the name of Father Malone's mother. The embezzled sum was also $12,000. 637 Galapago was sold the day before an archbishop was brought in from New Mexico to investigate the matter.
