= Frederick W. Neef House =

Historic house in Colorado, United States

- U.S. National Register of Historic Places
- Colorado State Register of Historic Properties
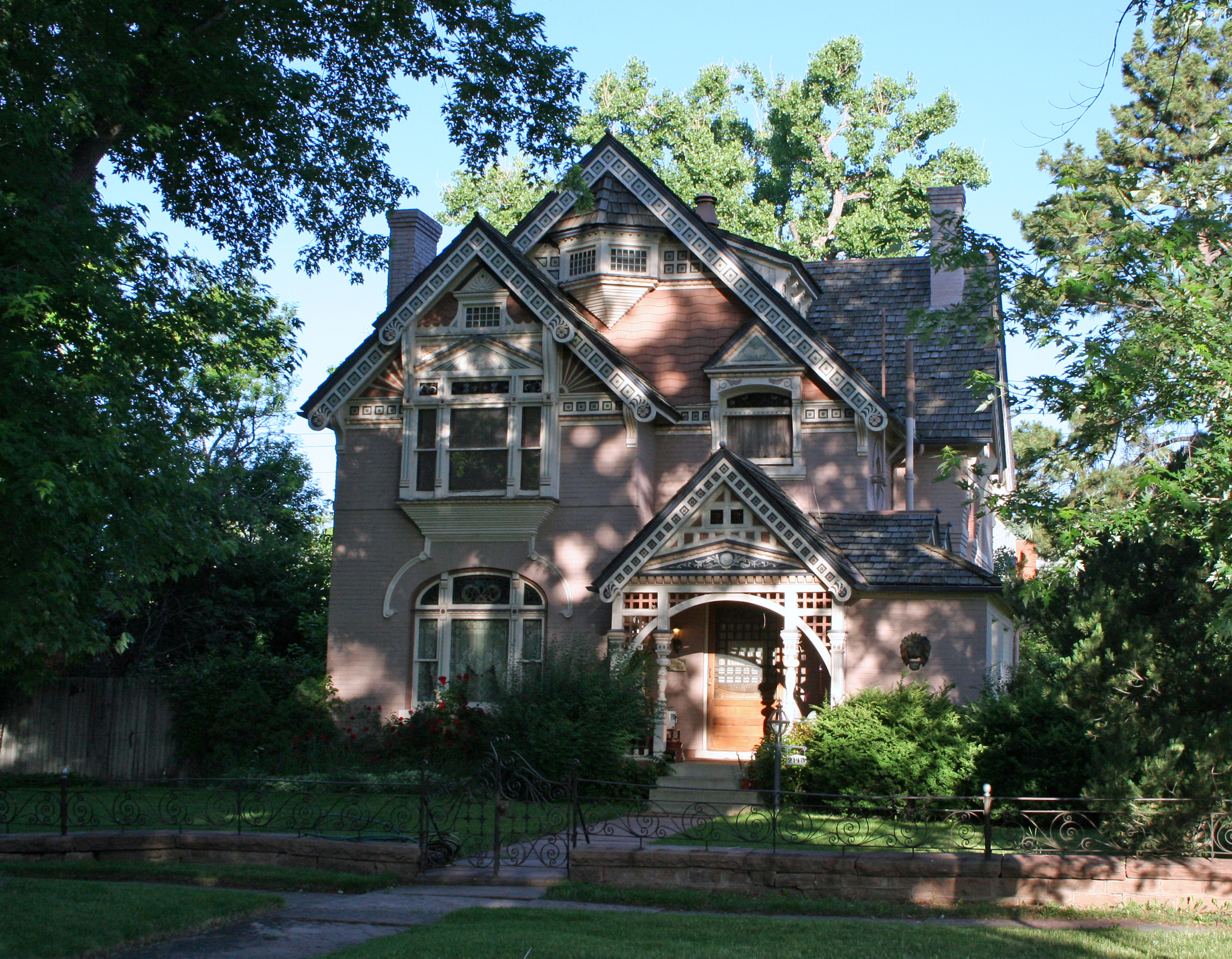
- Front of the Neef House

- Location within Colorado Location within the United States
- Interactive map showing the location of Frederick W. Neef Housse
- Location: 2143 Grove St., Denver, Colorado
- Coordinates: 39°44′59″N 105°1′35″W
- Area: 0.3 acres (0.12 ha)
- Built: 1886
- Architectural style: Stick-Eastlake, Queen Anne
- NRHP reference No.: 79000588
- CSRHP No.: 5DV.107
- Added to NRHP: October 25, 1979

The Frederick W. Neef House is a house in Denver, Colorado, United States that was built in 1886 and is listed on the U.S. National Register of Historic Places.

It is unclear why the house was incorrectly named, as Frederick Neef's middle name was Fredolin.

It was deemed historically significant for its association with early Denver businessman Frederick W. Neef and for its architecture. Frederick Neef was German and arrived in Denver in 1873. He and his brother Max owned saloons and wholesale businesses in liquor and tobacco. Together they built the Neef Brothers Brewery, reportedly one of the West's largest. Frederick bought out Max from the brewery and operated it until selling it in 1917.

Fred Neef arranged to have this house built and lived with his family in it for 31 years. The NRHP nominator termed the house to be "a fine example of late 19th century architecture in Denver" and suspected that it was not locally designed, but rather was a design from an architect's pattern book, however it was not possible to find the source. Writing in 1979, the nominator went on to note that

In all events, the Neef House is a well-executed version of the popular Queen Anne/Eastlake style, probably the finest surviving example in Denver. It clearly demonstrates the Victorian preoccupation with complex volumes and roof forms, and their love for elaborate detail. Of particular note is the east facade which has a strongly sculptured aspect and, in spite of the profusion of elements, displays a rich unified composition which is at once pleasant and dynamic. The original craftsmanship was of a high caliber and survives well despite an obvious lack of maintenance.

It was listed on the National Register of Historic Places in 1979.

The Shulz-Neef House at 1739 E. 29th St. in the Whittier neighborhood, a Denver Landmark, was purchased by Frederick at auction in 1883 and served as home for his brother Max and family.
