= List of Denver RTD rail stations =

Coordinates: 39.7392°N 104.9850°W

Location of Denver in the United States of America.

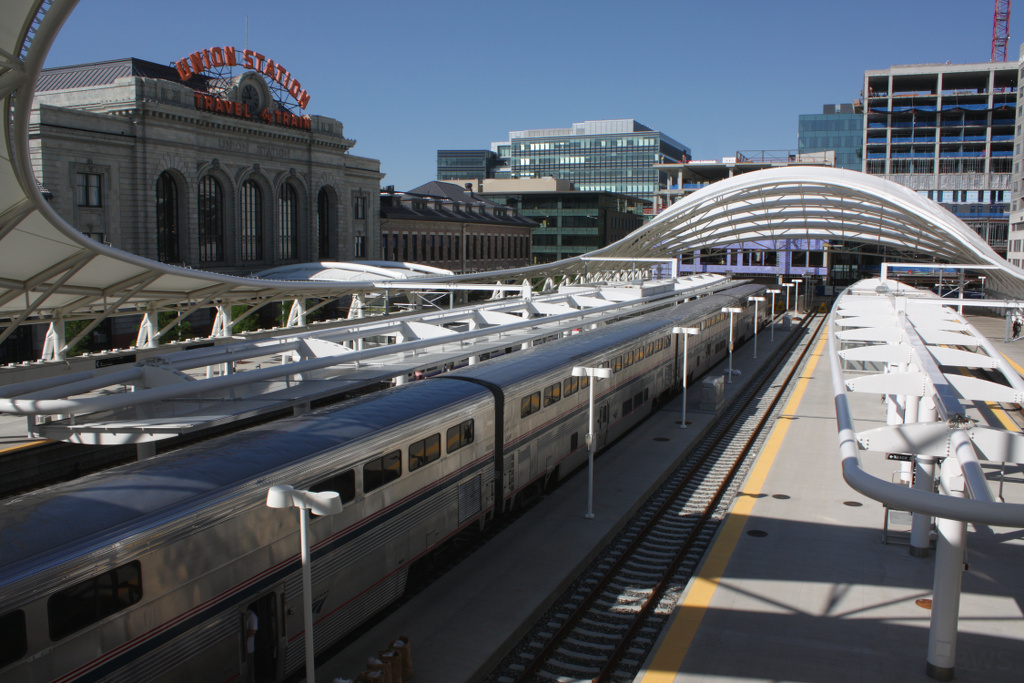
Union Station in Downtown Denver

The Regional Transportation District (RTD) operates a mass transit network, serving portions of Denver, Colorado, United States, and its surrounding metropolitan area, with light rail and commuter rail. As of December 2022, the 113-mile (182 km) urban rail transit system includes 75 stations on 10 lines: A, B, C, E, G, H, L, N, R, and W.

All of the stations are open-air structures featuring passenger canopies for protection from adverse weather conditions. The RTD has established criteria for station design with the intention of incorporating each station effectively into its surrounding community. All stations feature three elements according to the criteria: the platform, its transition plaza and the intermodal passenger transport available to and from the facility. Platforms are generally designed to accommodate four-car trains and may be in either a side, island or side center style. (Note: A side center platform is a configuration utilizing a single side platform on one side and a center platform to service the other track or tracks.) The transition plaza is the area where passenger services can be found between the platform and where intermodal access is available. All stations are decorated with works of public art as part of the RTD's "Art-n-Transit" program. They include independent works as well as pieces incorporated into the canopies, columns, pavers, windscreens, fencing and landscaping.

Light rail service began on October 8, 1994, with the opening of the initial fourteen stations on the 5.3-mile (8.5 km) Central Corridor segment from 30th & Downing station to I-25 & Broadway station. The first extension opened on July 14, 2000, and included the completion of an additional 8.7 miles (14.0 km) of rail and five stations through its present southern terminus at Littleton–Mineral station. In 2002, a four station, 1.8-mile (2.9 km) spur through the Central Platte Valley opened between the 10th & Osage station and Union Station. By November 2006, expansion to the southeast saw the completion of 19 miles (31 km) of rail and thirteen stations between I-25 & Broadway and both Nine Mile station in Aurora and Lincoln station in Lone Tree. On April 26, 2013, the W Line was opened which added 12.1 miles (19.5 km) of rail and eleven stations between Auraria West station and the Jefferson County Government Center–Golden station in Golden. The first commuter rail line, the A Line to Denver Airport station, opened on April 22, 2016.

Rail services used a zone-based fare system until 2024, where passengers were charged based on the number of zones through which they traveled. Fare zones were noted A, B, and C, based on distance from Downtown Denver, with a separate airport zone for travel to and from Denver Airport station. Beginning January 1, 2024, all stations use a flat fare system, with the exception of Denver Airport station, which has a higher airport fare.

== Stations ==
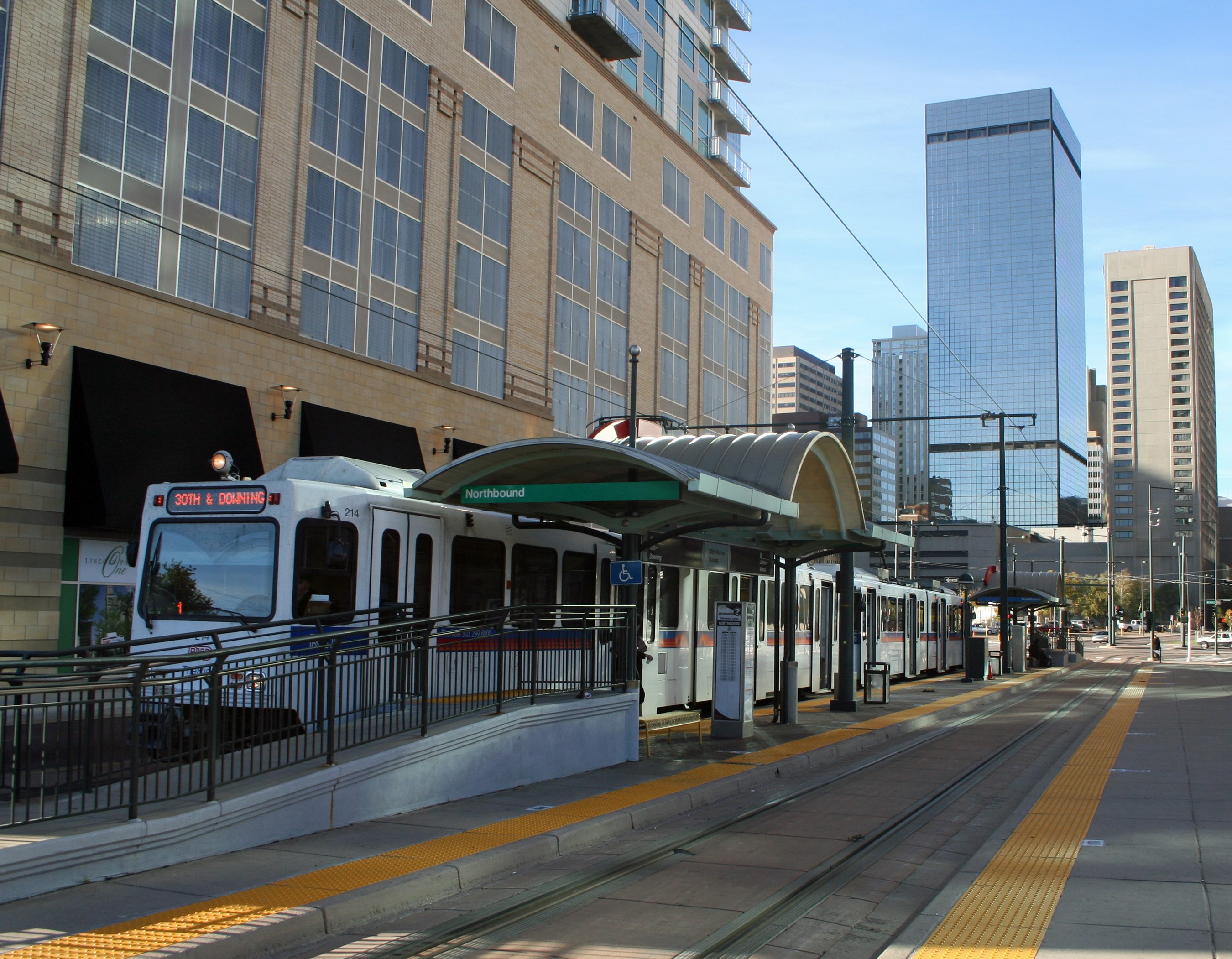
20th & Welton station

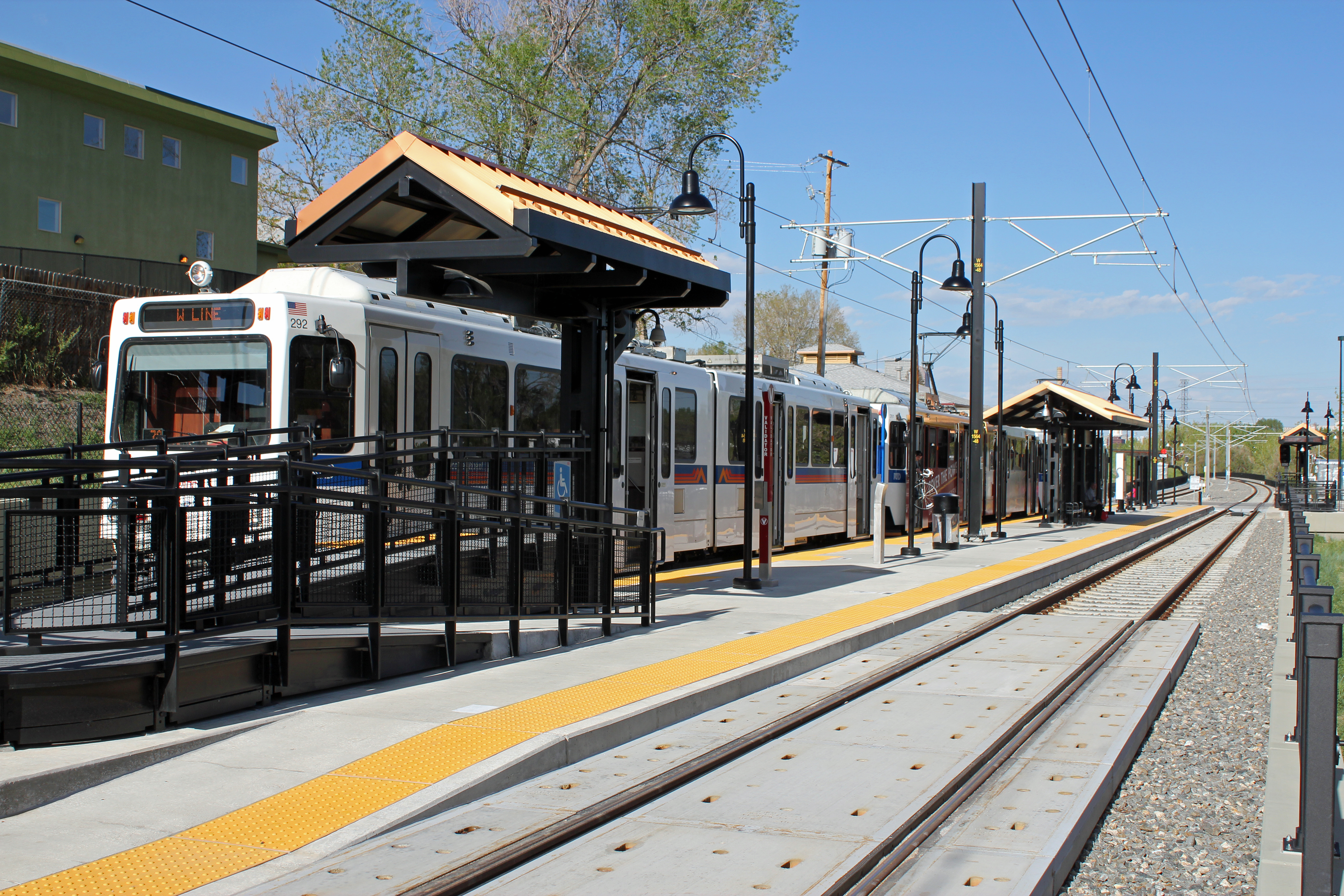
Knox station on the W Line

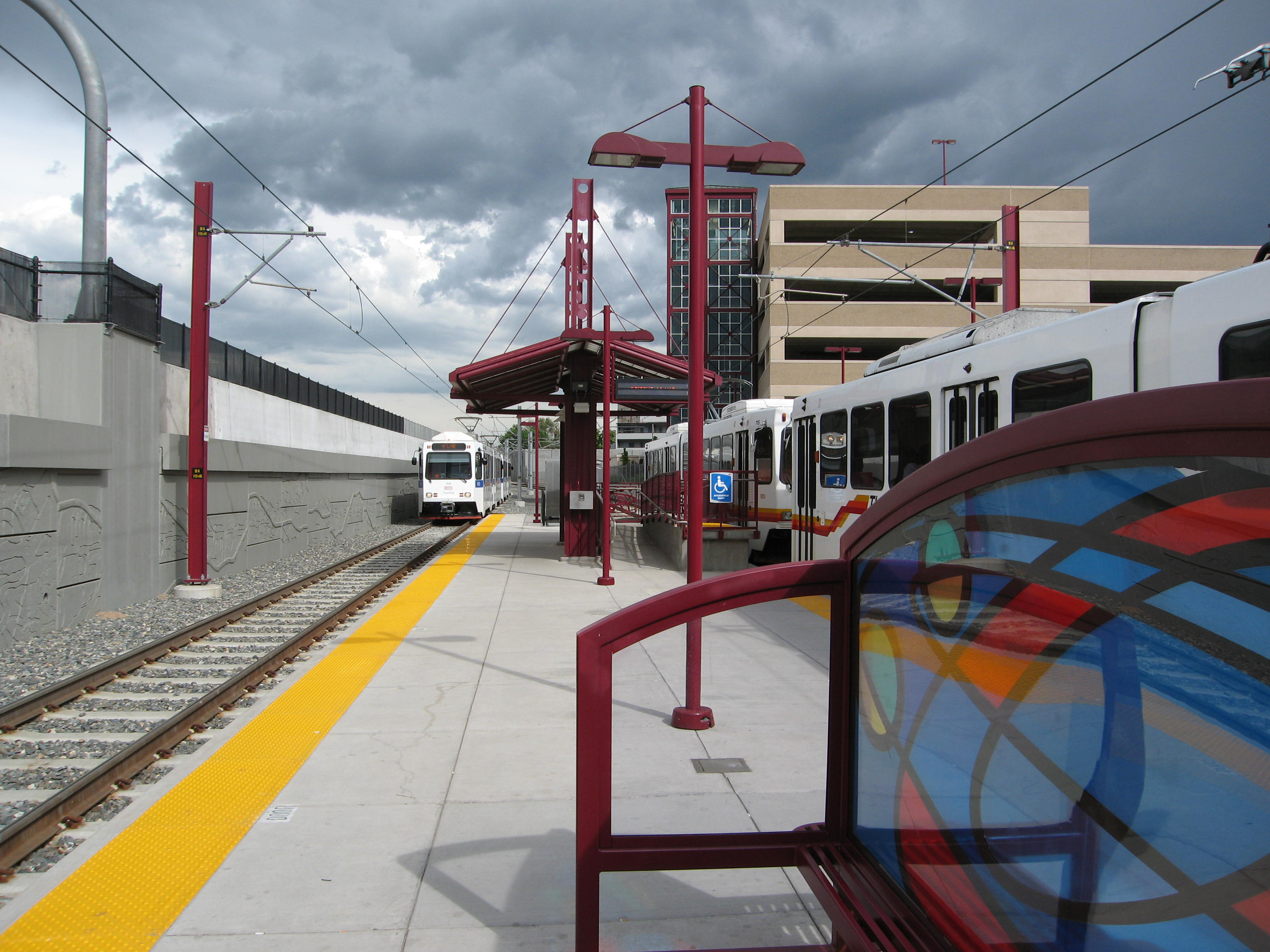
University of Denver station

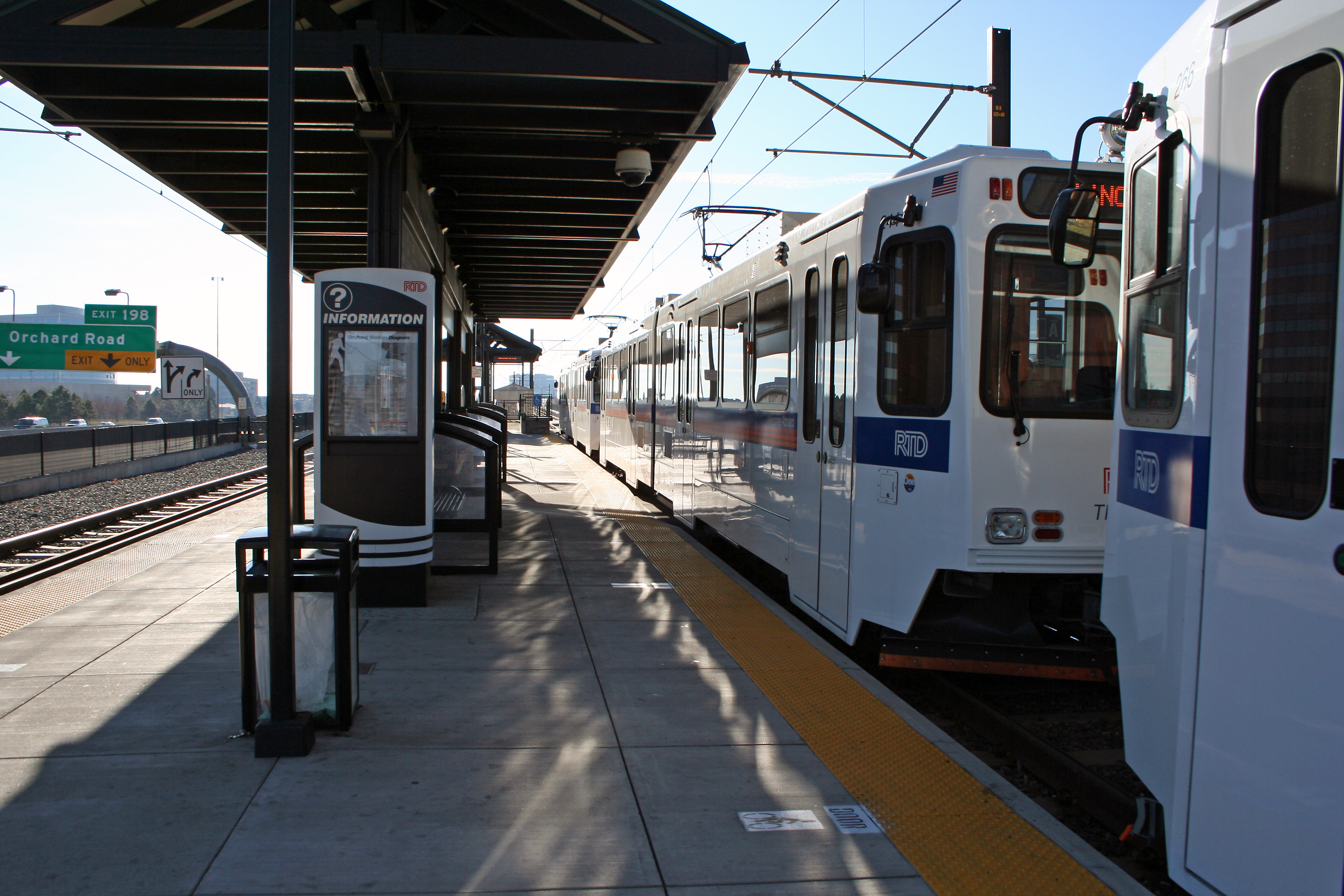
Orchard station

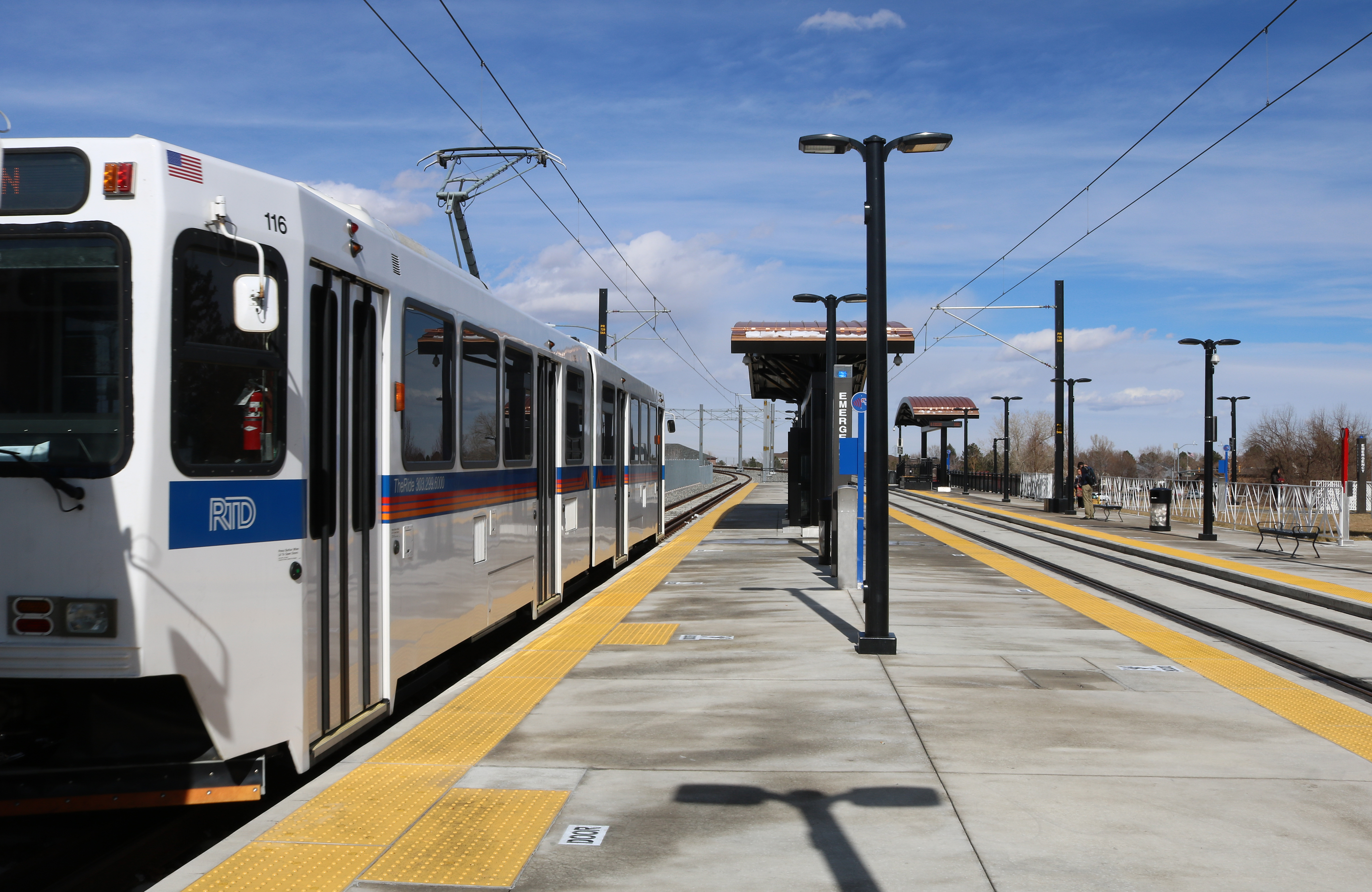
Iliff station

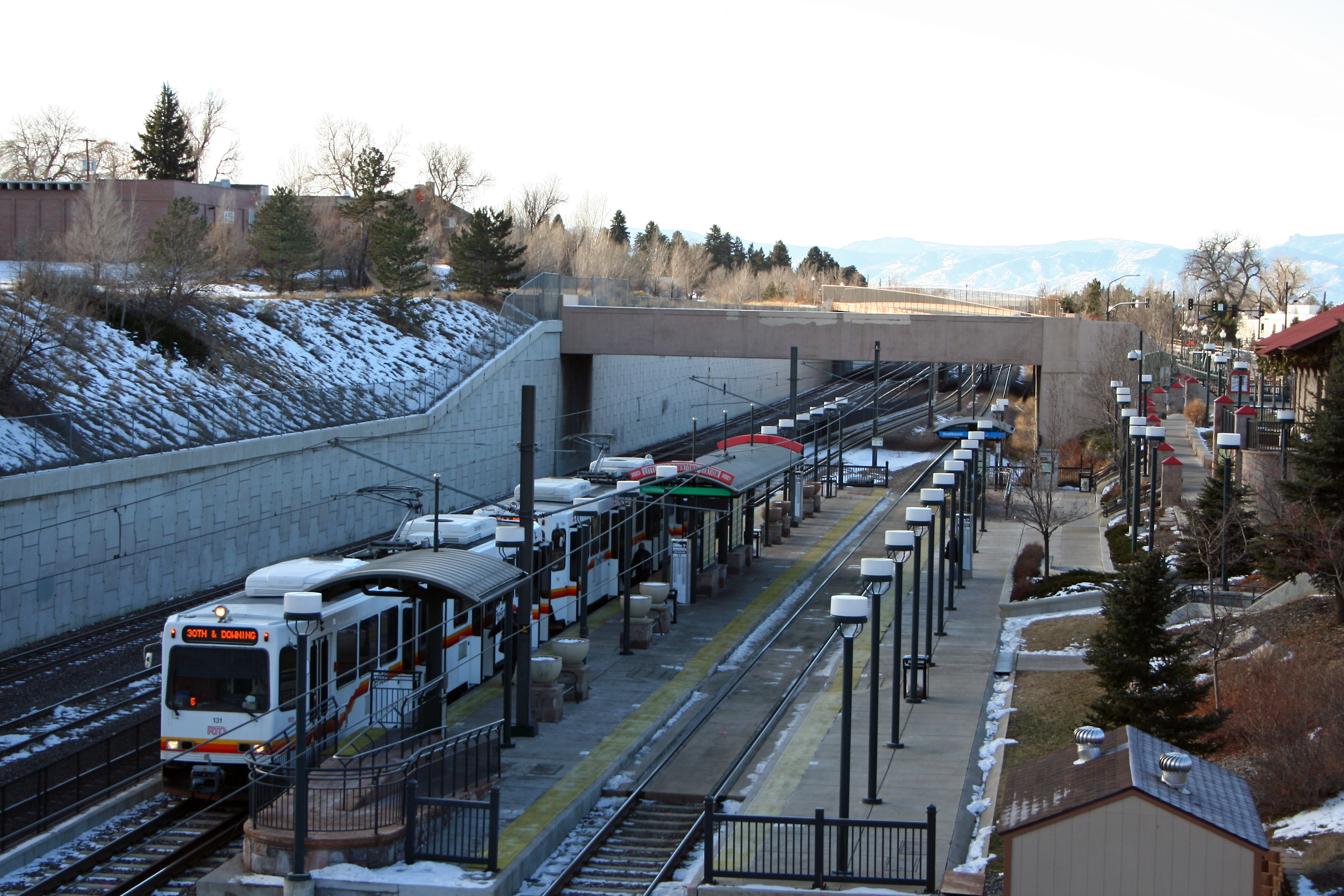
Littleton–Downtown station

*	Designated transfer stations
†	Terminal stations
*†	Transfer and terminal stations

Station	Lines	Jurisdiction	Opened	Fare zone	Average daily ridership (2025)	Reference
2nd Avenue & Abilene	R Line	Aurora	February 24, 2017	Local	307	
10th & Osage *	C Line; E Line	Denver	October 8, 1994	Local	2,146	
13th Avenue	R Line	Aurora	February 24, 2017	Local	185	
16th & California/Stout	L Line	Denver	October 8, 1994	Local	2,362	
18th & California/Stout	L Line	Denver	October 8, 1994	Local	2,230	
20th & Welton	L Line	Denver	October 8, 1994	Local	157	
25th & Welton	L Line	Denver	October 8, 1994	Local	176	
27th & Welton	L Line	Denver	October 8, 1994	Local	149	
30th & Downing †	L Line	Denver	October 8, 1994	Local	411	
38th & Blake	A Line	Denver	April 22, 2016	Local	1,795	
40th Ave & Airport Blvd–Gateway Park	A Line	Aurora	April 22, 2016	Local	3,641	
40th & Colorado	A Line	Denver	April 22, 2016	Local	1,698	
41st & Fox	B Line; G Line	Denver	April 26, 2019	Local	533	
48th & Brighton/National Western Center	N Line	Denver	September 21, 2020	Local	360	
60th & Sheridan/Arvada Gold Strike	G Line	Arvada	April 26, 2019	Local	503	
61st & Peña	A Line	Denver	April 22, 2016	Local	1,740	
Alameda	C Line; E Line	Denver	October 8, 1994	Local	2,247	
Arapahoe at Village Center	E Line; R Line; T Line	Greenwood Village	November 17, 2006	Local	1,643	
Arvada Ridge	G Line	Arvada	April 26, 2019	Local	536	
Auraria West *	C Line; E Line; W Line	Denver	April 5, 2002	Local	2,524	
Aurora Metro Center	R Line	Aurora	February 24, 2017	Local	788	
Ball Arena–Elitch Gardens	C Line; E Line; W Line	Denver	April 5, 2002	Local	964	
Belleview	E Line; R Line; T Line	Denver	November 17, 2006	Local	1,364	
Central Park	A Line	Denver	April 22, 2016	Local	3,528	
Clear Creek/Federal	G Line	Berkley	April 26, 2019	Local	347	
Colfax	R Line	Aurora	February 24, 2017	Local	644	
Colfax at Auraria	H Line	Denver	October 8, 1994	Local	1,803	
Colorado	E Line; T Line	Denver	November 17, 2006	Local	1,641	
Commerce City/72nd	N Line	Commerce City	September 21, 2020	Local	600	
County Line	E Line; R Line; T Line	Lone Tree	November 17, 2006	Local	880	
Dayton	R Line	Greenwood Village	November 17, 2006	Local	572	
Decatur–Federal	W Line	Denver	April 26, 2013	Local	1,480	
Denver Airport †	A Line	Denver	April 22, 2016	Airport	11,744	
Dry Creek	E Line; R Line; T Line	Centennial	November 17, 2006	Local	757	
Eastlake/124th †	N Line	Thornton	September 21, 2020	Local	1,599	
Empower Field at Mile High	C Line; E Line; W Line	Denver	April 5, 2002	Local	733	
Englewood	C Line	Englewood	July 14, 2000	Local	1365	
Evans	C Line	Denver	July 14, 2000	Local	623	
Federal Center	W Line	Lakewood	April 26, 2013	Local	1,333	
Fitzsimons	R Line	Aurora	February 24, 2017	Local	185	
Florida †	R Line	Aurora	February 24, 2017	Local	1,661	
Garrison	W Line	Lakewood	April 26, 2013	Local	676	
I-25 & Broadway *	C Line; E Line	Denver	October 8, 1994	Local	4,196	
Iliff	R Line	Aurora	February 24, 2017	Local	887	
Jefferson County Government Center–Golden †	W Line	Golden	April 26, 2013	Local	1,321	
Knox	W Line	Denver	April 26, 2013	Local	662	
Lakewood–Wadsworth	W Line	Lakewood	April 26, 2013	Local	1,625	
Lamar	W Line	Lakewood	April 26, 2013	Local	781	
Lincoln	E Line; R Line; T Line	Lone Tree	November 17, 2006	Local	1,327	
Littleton–Downtown	C Line	Littleton	July 14, 2000	Local	1,168	
Littleton–Mineral †	C Line	Littleton	July 14, 2000	Local	1,903	
Lone Tree City Center	E Line; R Line	Lone Tree	May 17, 2019	Local	20	
Louisiana–Pearl	E Line; T Line	Denver	November 17, 2006	Local	665	
Nine Mile	R Line	Aurora	November 17, 2006	Local	1,629	
Northglenn/112th	N Line	Northglenn	September 21, 2020	Local	585	
Oak	W Line	Lakewood	April 26, 2013	Local	1,105	
Olde Town Arvada	G Line	Arvada	April 26, 2019	Local	1,281	
Orchard	E Line; R Line; T Line	Greenwood Village	November 17, 2006	Local	508	
Original Thornton/88th	N Line	Thornton	September 21, 2020	Local	610	
Oxford–City of Sheridan	C Line	Sheridan	July 14, 2000	Local	454	
Pecos Junction *	B Line; G Line	North Washington	April 26, 2019	Local	260	
Peoria *†	A Line; R Line	Aurora	April 22, 2016	Local	4,592	
Perry	W Line	Denver	April 26, 2013	Local	484	
Red Rocks College	W Line	Lakewood	April 26, 2013	Local	206	
RidgeGate Parkway †	E Line; R Line	Lone Tree	May 17, 2019	Local	1,193	
Sheridan	W Line	Denver and Lakewood	April 26, 2013	Local	1,108	
Sky Ridge	E Line; R Line	Lone Tree	May 17, 2019	Local	305	
Southmoor *	E Line; T Line	Denver	November 17, 2006	Local	1,543	
Theatre District–Convention Center	H Line	Denver	December 6, 2004	Local	1,410	
Thornton Crossroads/104th	N Line	Thornton	September 21, 2020	Local	917	
Union Station *†	A Line; B Line; C Line; E Line; G Line; N Line; W Line	Denver	April 5, 2002	Local	24,326	
University of Denver	E Line; T Line	Denver	November 17, 2006	Local	999	
Westminster †	B Line	Westminster	July 25, 2016	Local	356	
Wheat Ridge/Ward †	G Line	Wheat Ridge	April 26, 2019	Local	693	
Yale	E Line; T Line	Denver and Holly Hills	November 17, 2006	Local	524	

== Future stations ==
FasTracks is a twelve-year, $6.9 billion public transportation expansion developed by the Regional Transportation District and currently underway. The plan called for six new lines: light rail, diesel commuter rail, and electric commuter rail lines with a combined length of 122 miles (196 km) to be opened between 2013 and 2017. The first expansion undertaken was the West Corridor between Denver and Golden which opened April 26, 2013. The second expansion and first commuter rail line to open was the University of Colorado A Line between Denver and Denver International Airport on April 22, 2016. The G Line commenced service in April 2019. The North Metro Rail Line (N line) commenced service in September 2020.

Station	Lines	Jurisdiction
Boulder Junction	B Line	Boulder
Church Ranch	B Line	Westminster
Downtown Longmont	B Line	Longmont
Flatiron	B Line	Broomfield
Gunbarrel	B Line	Boulder
Louisville	B Line	Louisville
Bates	C Line	Englewood
C-470 & Lucent	C Line	Highlands Ranch
33rd & Downing	L Line	Denver
35th & Downing	L Line	Denver
York/144th	N Line	Thornton
North Thornton/Hwy 7	N Line	Thornton

== Former stations ==
As of 2019, three RTD stations have been removed from the system: 29th & Welton, 14th & California, and 14th & Stout, all on the former D Line in Downtown Denver.

Station	Line(s)	Jurisdiction	Opened	Closed
14th & California	D Line	Denver	October 8, 1994	October 2004
14th & Stout	D Line	Denver	October 8, 1994	October 2004
29th & Welton	D Line	Denver	October 8, 1994	January 6, 2013

== See also ==
- Regional Transportation District
- List of Colorado railroads
- Bibliography of Colorado
- Geography of Colorado
- History of Colorado
- Index of Colorado-related articles
- List of Colorado-related lists
- Outline of Colorado
