= Skyridge (disambiguation) =

Skyridge or Sky Ridge may refer to:

- Sky Ridge Medical Center, hospital in Lone Tree, Colorado, founded 2003
  - Sky Ridge station, Light rail station, serving the hospital
- Skyridge High School, State school in Lehi, Utah
- Skyridge, Pokémon Trading Card set

== See also ==
- Skybridge
