= Southmoor station =

Light rail station in Denver, Colorado

Southmoor
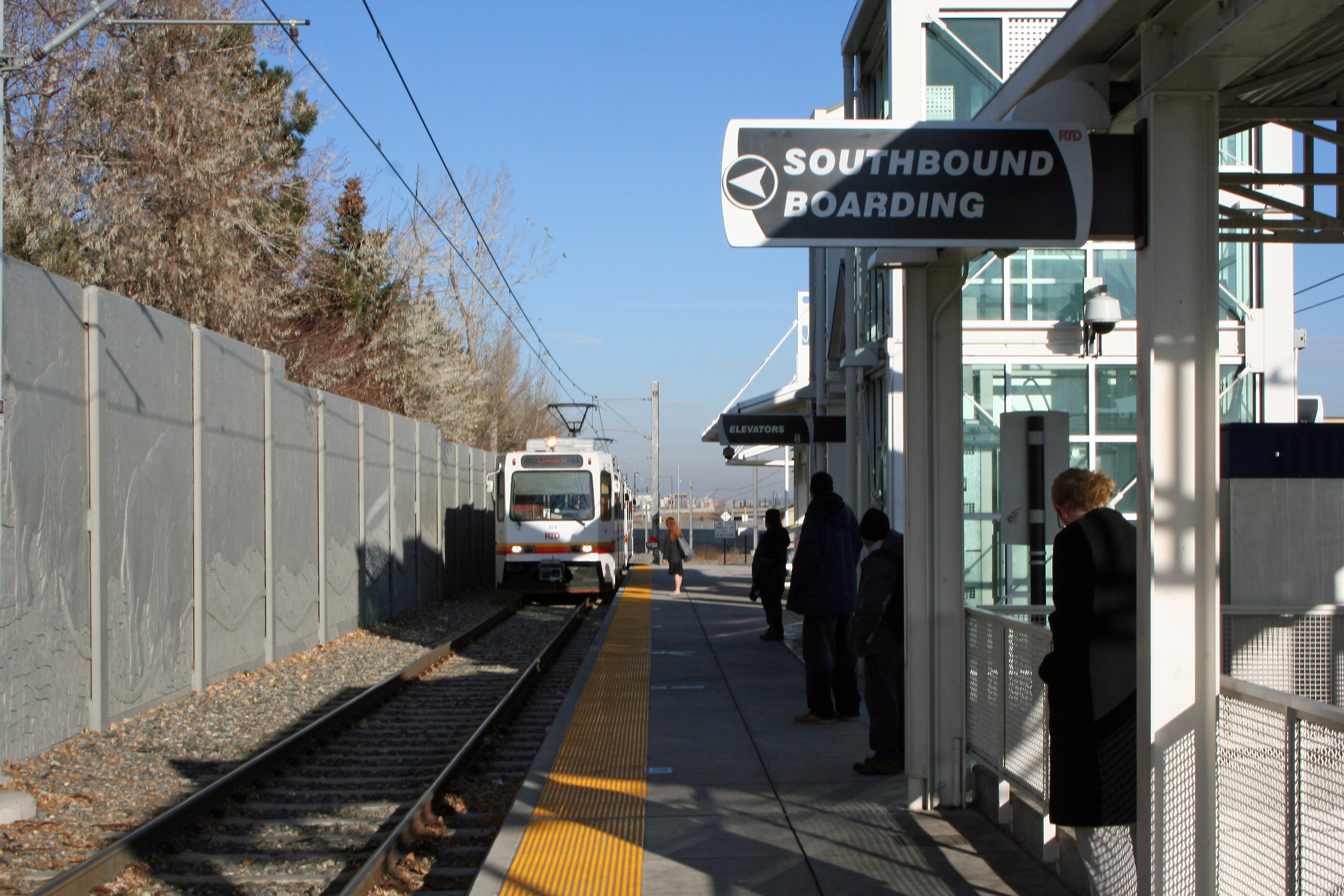
- Southmoor station platform

General information
- Location: 3737 South Monaco Parkway; Denver, Colorado
- Coordinates: 39.6488°N 104.9163°W
- Owner: Regional Transportation District
- Line: Southeast Corridor
- Platforms: 1 island platform
- Tracks: 2
- Connections: RTD Bus: 35, 40, 46, 65, 105

Construction
- Structure type: At-grade
- Parking: 788 spaces
- Cycle facilities: 16 racks, 22 lockers
- Accessible: Yes

History
- Opened: November 17, 2006

Passengers
- 2025: 1,543 (average daily)
- Rank: 23 out of 75

Services
| Preceding station | RTD | Following station |
|---|---|---|
| Yale toward Union Station | E Line | Belleview toward RidgeGate Parkway |
| Yale toward Alameda | T Line | Belleview toward Lincoln |
Former services
| Preceding station | RTD | Following station |
|---|---|---|
| Yale toward 18th & California | F Line | Belleview toward RidgeGate Parkway |
Future services
| Preceding station | RTD | Following station |
|---|---|---|
| Yale toward 18th & California/Stout | H Line Suspended | Dayton toward Florida |
Location

Southmoor station is a light rail station in Denver, Colorado, United States. It is operated by the Regional Transportation District (RTD), and was opened on November 17, 2006. The station is currently served by the E and T Lines.

Southmoor is typically served by the H Line, which is currently suspended due to the Downtown Rail Reconstruction Project. When the H Line resumes service, this station will be the last shared by the E and H Lines southbound from 10th & Osage, and the last transfer point for passengers travelling south to the Denver Tech Center, Centennial, and Lone Tree on the E Line, and northeast to Aurora on the H Line. T Line service will be eliminated when the H Line is restored.

== Station layout ==
1F

Platform Level

South Monaco Parkway; bus bays; parking
I-25
Northbound
← toward Union Station (Yale)
← toward Alameda (Yale)
Island platform, doors will open on the left
Southbound
toward RidgeGate Parkway (Belleview) →
toward Lincoln (Belleview) →
B1
Pedestrian tunnel

There is no access to the station from the neighborhood immediately to its west. All passengers wishing to use the station must come from South Monaco Parkway, via a pedestrian tunnel under Interstate 25.

== Public art ==
The station featured an interactive piece of public art entitled Harmonic Pass: Denver. Created by Christopher Janney, it features a mixture of light and sound throughout the pedestrian tunnel. Within each column are photoelectric sensors and an audio speaker. Also, a riddle is etched on plaques on both ends of the tunnel. If a person can decipher the riddle and trigger the columns in the pattern described, the tunnel will “dance” a pattern of light and sound in reply. As of 2026, the art has been de-activated but remains present at the station.
