= Louisiana–Pearl station =

Light rail station in Denver, Colorado

Louisiana•Pearl
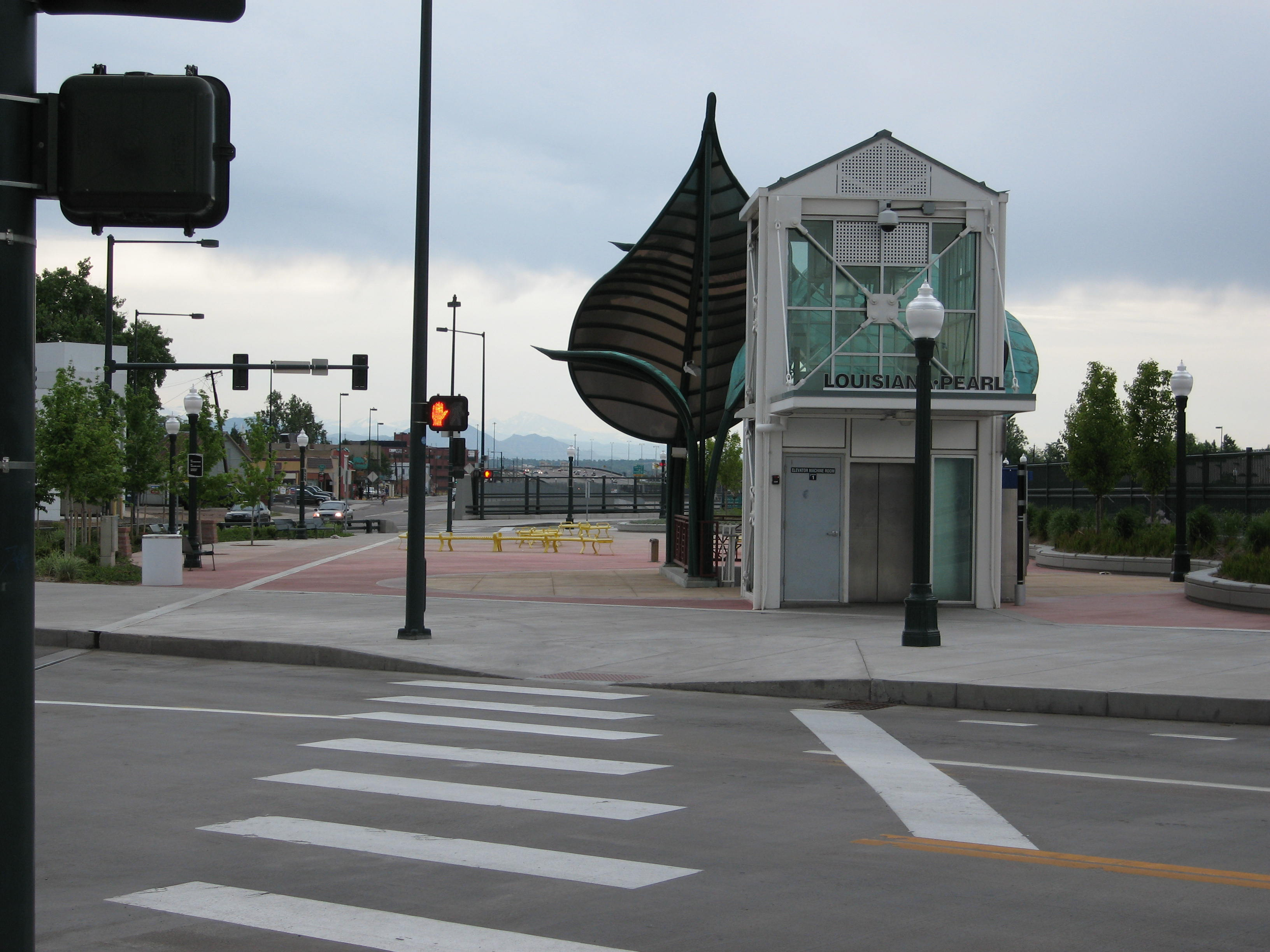
- Street level view of light rail station

General information
- Other names: Louisiana & Pearl; Louisiana•Pearl
- Location: 755 East Louisiana Avenue; Denver, Colorado
- Coordinates: 39°41′34″N 104°58′42″W
- Owner: Regional Transportation District
- Line: Southeast Corridor
- Platforms: 1 island platform
- Tracks: 2
- Connections: RTD Bus: 11, 12

Construction
- Structure type: Below grade
- Accessible: Yes

History
- Opened: November 17, 2006

Passengers
- 2025: 665 (average daily)
- Rank: 47 out of 75

Services
Preceding station	RTD	Following station
I-25 & Broadway toward Union Station	E Line	University of Denver toward RidgeGate Parkway
I-25 & Broadway toward Alameda	T Line	University of Denver toward Lincoln
Former services
Preceding station	RTD	Following station
I-25 & Broadway toward 18th & California	F Line	University of Denver toward RidgeGate Parkway
Future services
Preceding station	RTD	Following station
I-25 & Broadway toward 18th & California/Stout	H Line Suspended	University of Denver toward Florida
Location

Louisiana–Pearl station (sometimes stylized as Louisiana & Pearl or Louisiana•Pearl) is a partially underground light rail station in Denver, Colorado. The station is operated by the Regional Transportation District (RTD), and was opened on November 17, 2006. It is currently served by the E and T Lines.

Louisiana & Pearl is typically served by the H Line, which is currently suspended due to the Downtown Rail Reconstruction Project. When complete, H Line service will be restored and the T Line will be eliminated.

== Station layout ==
1F
East Louisiana Avenue; bus bays
B1

Platform Level

I-25
Northbound
← toward Union Station (I-25 & Broadway)
← toward Alameda (I-25 & Broadway)
Island platform, doors will open on the left
Southbound
toward RidgeGate Parkway (University of Denver) →
toward Lincoln (University of Denver) →

Louisiana & Pearl station is located in the Platt Park neighborhood. Louisiana–Pearl features a public art, kinetic sculpture entitled Strange Machine created by Ira Sherman and dedicated in 2006.

The station sits below-grade, alongside Interstate 25 and beneath the intersection of East Louisiana Avenue, South Washington Street, and South Buchtel Boulevard. Washington Park is approximately 1,500 feet east of the station along East Louisiana Avenue. The South Pearl Street shopping and dining corridor is one block west of the station.
