= T Train =

T Train may refer to any of the following:

- T (New York City Subway service), a service designation of the New York City Subway
- T Third Street, a Muni Metro light rail line in San Francisco
- T Line (Sound Transit), a streetcar in Tacoma, Washington
- T Line (RTD), a light rail service in Denver, Colorado
- Massachusetts Bay Transportation Authority, operator of railway systems in Massachusetts popularly referred to as "The T"
- Pittsburgh Light Rail, also known as "The T"
