= Arapahoe at Village Center station =

Light rail station in Greenwood Village, Colorado

Arapahoe at Village Center
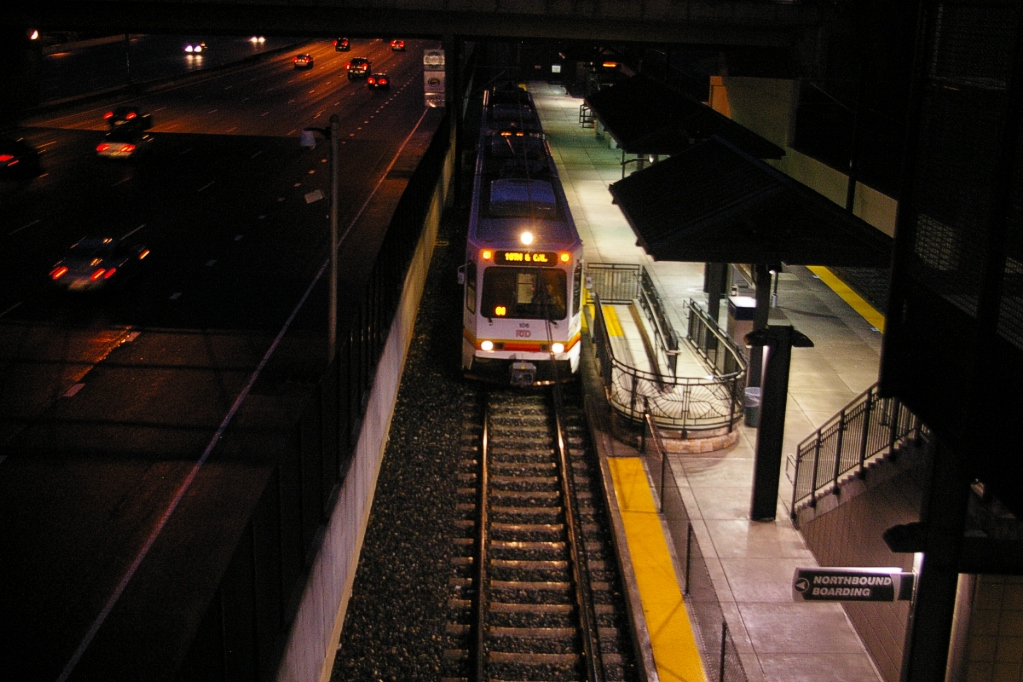
- Arapahoe at Village Center platform as seen from the pedestrian bridge

General information
- Location: 8800 East Caley Avenue; Greenwood Village, Colorado
- Coordinates: 39.6005°N 104.8886°W
- Owner: Regional Transportation District
- Line: Southeast Corridor
- Platforms: 1 island platform
- Tracks: 2
- Connections: Bustang: RamsRoute; RTD Bus: 66, 153, 169, AT, ATA, Arapahoe FlexRide, Orchard FlexRide

Construction
- Parking: 817 spaces
- Cycle facilities: 22 racks, 10 lockers
- Accessible: Yes

History
- Opened: November 17, 2006

Passengers
- 2025: 1,643 (average daily)
- Rank: 18 out of 75

Services
Preceding station	RTD	Following station
Orchard toward Union Station	E Line	Dry Creek toward RidgeGate Parkway
Orchard toward Peoria	R Line	Dry Creek toward RidgeGate Parkway
Orchard toward Alameda	T Line	Dry Creek toward Lincoln
Former services
Preceding station	RTD	Following station
Orchard toward 18th & California	F Line	Dry Creek toward RidgeGate Parkway
Orchard toward Nine Mile	G Line (2006–2009)	Dry Creek toward Lincoln
Location

Arapahoe at Village Center station is a light rail station in Greenwood Village, Colorado. It is operated by the Regional Transportation District (RTD), and was opened on November 17, 2006. The station is currently served by the E, R, and T Lines.

== Station layout ==
2F
Pedestrian bridge
1F

Platform Level

Caley Avenue; bus bays; parking
I-25
Northbound
← toward Union Station (Orchard)
← toward Peoria (Orchard)
← toward Alameda (Orchard)
Island platform, doors will open on the left
Southbound
toward RidgeGate Parkway (Dry Creek) →
toward Lincoln (Dry Creek) →
Fiddler's Green Amphitheater; Fiddler's Green Circle

The Fiddler's Green Amphitheater and office buildings along Fiddler's Green Circle are located immediately west of the station entrance. The station's parking and bus bays are located east of the station across Interstate 25, accessible via the pedestrian bridge. The AT and ATA bus routes provide one-stop service via Nine Mile from the station to Denver International Airport, often completing the journey quicker (albeit much less frequently) than the R Line.

The station features a public art installation of a trio of sculptures entitled Nucleus. It was created by Michael Clapper and dedicated in 2010.
