= Colorado station =

Light rail station in Denver, Colorado

Colorado
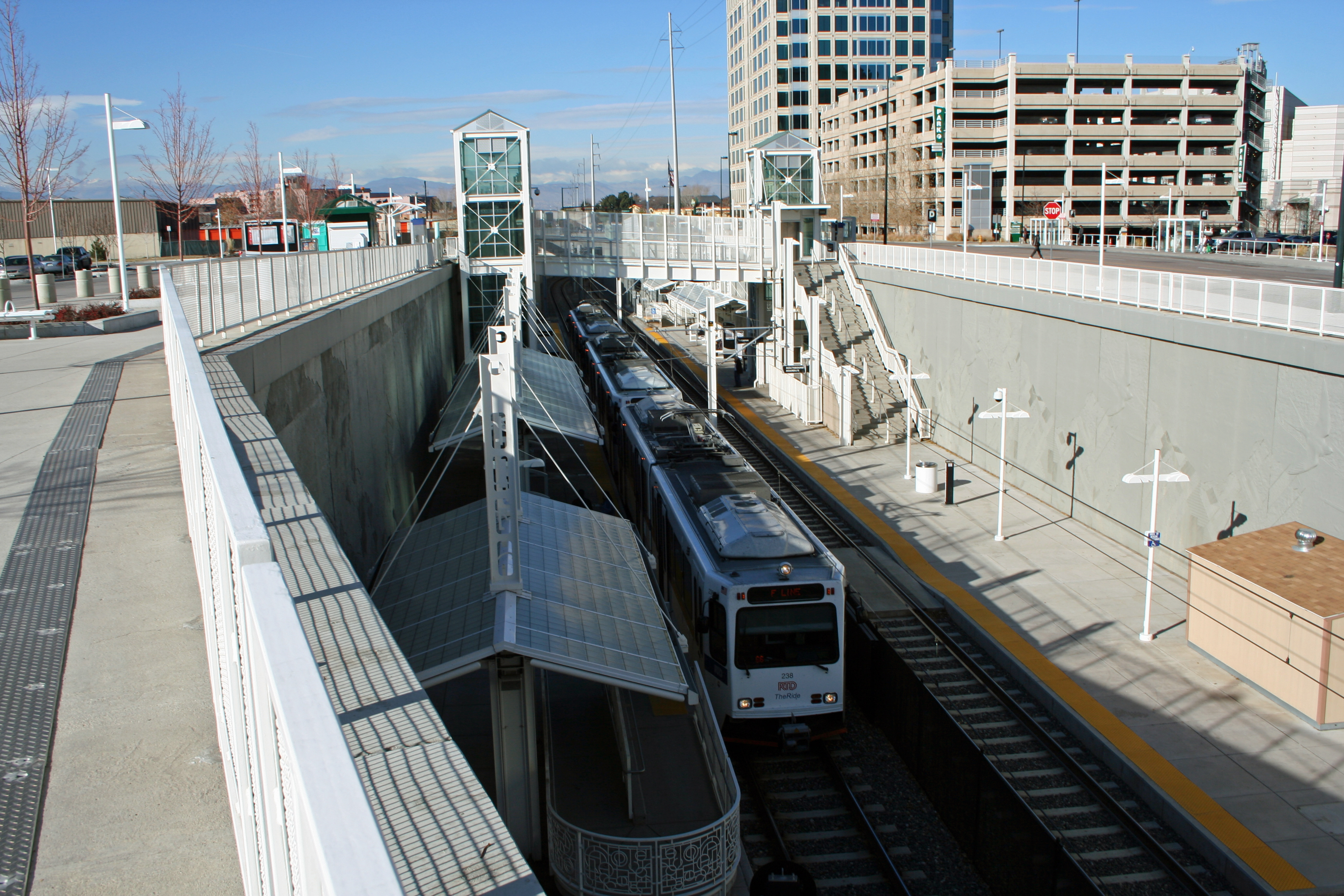
- The below grade Colorado RTD station

General information
- Location: 4300 East Colorado Center Drive; Denver, Colorado
- Coordinates: 39.6795°N 104.9375°W
- Owner: Regional Transportation District
- Line: Southeast Corridor
- Platforms: 2 side platforms
- Tracks: 2
- Connections: Bustang: South Line; RTD Bus: 21, 40, 46

Construction
- Structure type: Below-grade
- Parking: 363 spaces
- Cycle facilities: 8 racks, 24 lockers
- Accessible: Yes

History
- Opened: November 17, 2006

Passengers
- 2025: 1,641 (average daily)
- Rank: 19 out of 75

Services
Preceding station	RTD	Following station
University of Denver toward Union Station	E Line	Yale toward RidgeGate Parkway
University of Denver toward Alameda	T Line	Yale toward Lincoln
Former services
Preceding station	RTD	Following station
University of Denver toward 18th & California	F Line	Yale toward RidgeGate Parkway
Future services
Preceding station	RTD	Following station
University of Denver toward 18th & California/Stout	H Line Suspended	Yale toward Florida
Location

Colorado station is a light rail station in Denver, Colorado, United States. It is operated by the Regional Transportation District (RTD), and was opened on November 17, 2006. It is currently served by the E and T Lines.

Colorado is typically served by the H Line, which is currently suspended due to the Downtown Rail Reconstruction Project. When complete, H Line service will be restored and the T Line will be eliminated.

== Station layout ==
1F
East Colorado Center Drive; bus bays
East Evans Avenue; parking
B1

Platform Level

Side platform, doors will open on the right
Northbound
← toward Union Station (University of Denver)
← toward Alameda (University of Denver)
Southbound
toward RidgeGate Parkway (Yale) →
toward Lincoln (Yale) →
Side platform, doors will open on the right

Colorado station is located next to the Colorado Center, a large movie theater and office building complex. The station features a public art sculpture entitled Big Boots, which was created by Ries Niemi and dedicated in 2006.

The station sits in an open cut below grade; tracks enter a tunnel on either side. Bus bays are located to the north of the station, and parking to the south. A bridge over the station connects the bus bays and parking lot, and provides access to both platforms.
