= Dry Creek station =

Light rail station in Centennial, Colorado

Dry Creek
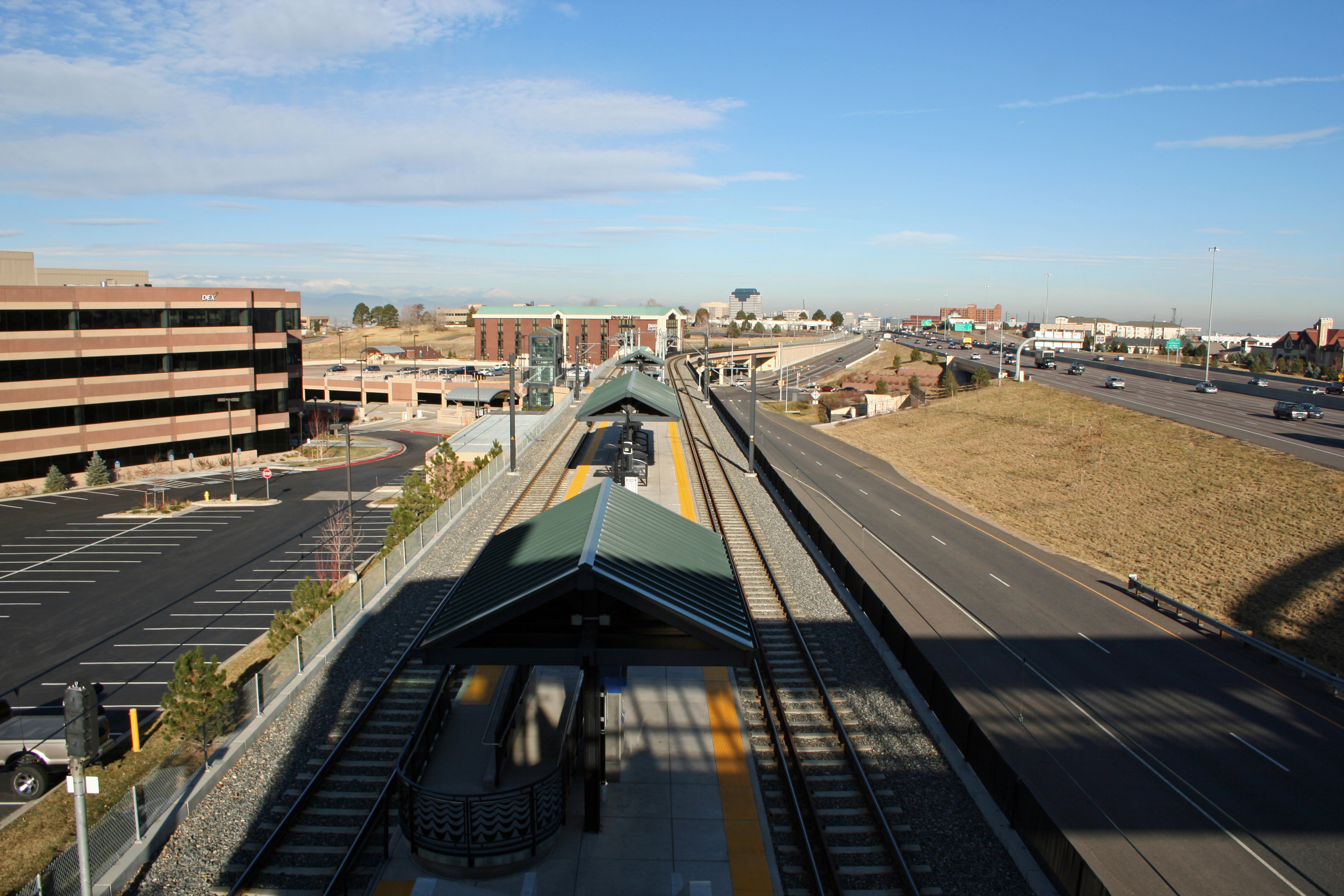
- A view of the Dry Creek station from the top of the stairs to the adjoining pedestrian bridge.

General information
- Location: 9450 East Dry Creek Road; Centennial, Colorado
- Coordinates: 39.5786°N 104.8763°W
- Owner: Regional Transportation District
- Line: Southeast Corridor
- Platforms: 1 island platform
- Tracks: 2
- Connections: RTD Bus: Inverness North FlexRide

Construction
- Structure type: Elevated
- Parking: 235 spaces
- Cycle facilities: 6 racks
- Accessible: Yes

History
- Opened: November 17, 2006

Passengers
- 2025: 757 (average daily)
- Rank: 43 out of 75

Services
Preceding station	RTD	Following station
Arapahoe at Village Center toward Union Station	E Line	County Line toward RidgeGate Parkway
Arapahoe at Village Center toward Peoria	R Line	County Line toward RidgeGate Parkway
Arapahoe at Village Center toward Alameda	T Line	County Line toward Lincoln
Former services
Preceding station	RTD	Following station
Arapahoe at Village Center toward 18th & California	F Line	County Line toward RidgeGate Parkway
Arapahoe at Village Center toward Nine Mile	G Line (2006–2009)	County Line toward Lincoln
Location

Dry Creek station is a light rail station in Centennial, Colorado. It is operated by the Regional Transportation District (RTD), and was opened on November 17, 2006. The station is currently served by the E, R, and T Lines.

== Station layout ==
3F
Pedestrian bridge
2F

Platform Level

Inverness Drive
I-25
Northbound
← toward Union Station (Arapahoe at Village Center)
← toward Peoria (Arapahoe at Village Center)
← toward Alameda (Arapahoe at Village Center)
Island platform, doors will open on the left
Southbound
toward RidgeGate Parkway (County Line) →
toward Lincoln (County Line) →
1F
Dry Creek Road; Dayton Street; bus bays; parking

The station's parking garage can be accessed via the north entrance, along Dry Creek Road. The station's bus bays and Dayton Street can be accessed via the south entrance. Inverness Drive can be accessed via the pedestrian bridge over Interstate 25.

The station features a public art installation of a series of stainless steel tubes holding hourglasses that contain pyrite entitled Fools Gold. It was created by John McEnroe and dedicated in 2006.
