= Orchard station (RTD) =

Light rail station in Greenwood Village, Colorado

Orchard
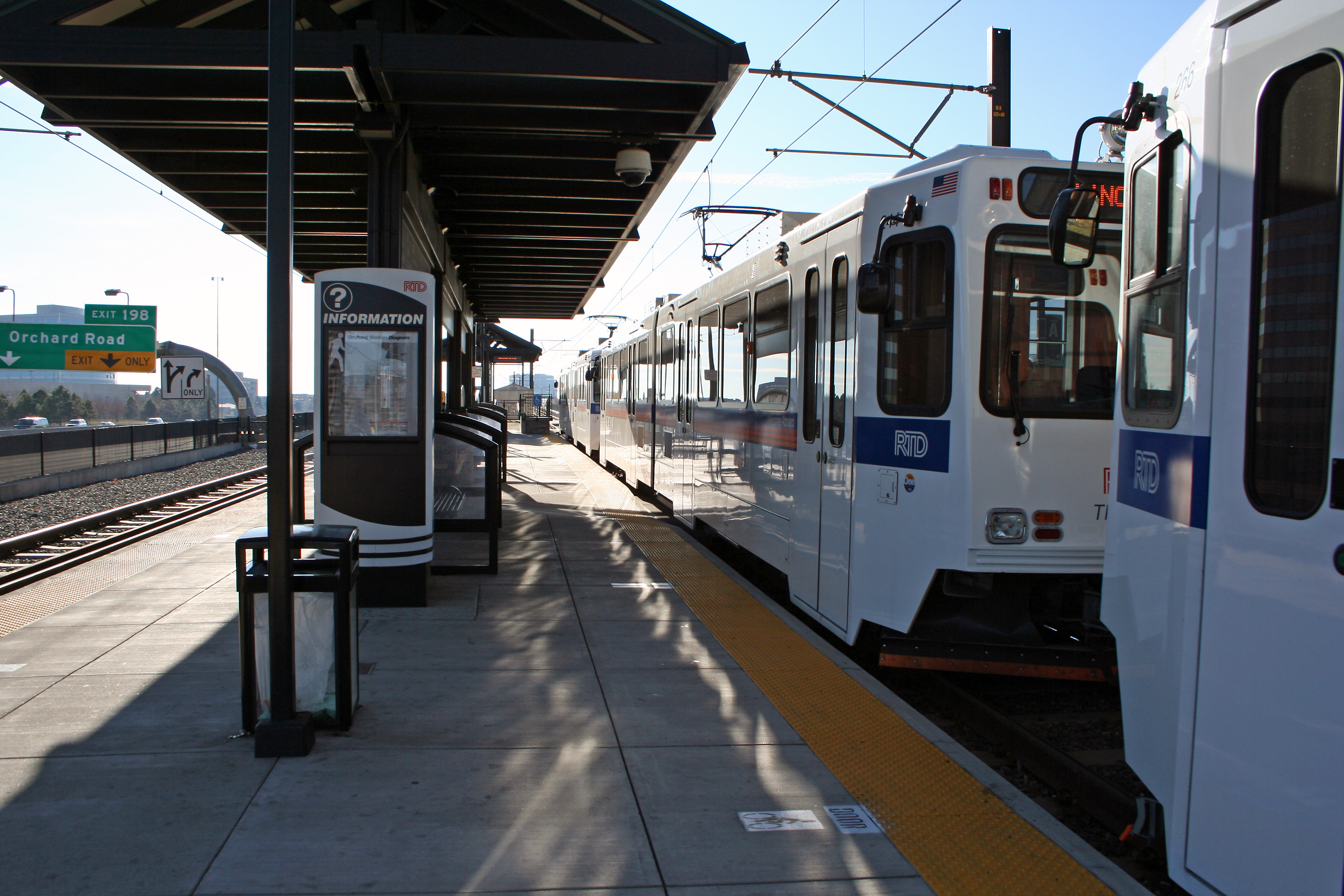
- Orchard station platform looking south

General information
- Location: 5652 Greenwood Plaza Boulevard; Greenwood Village, Colorado
- Coordinates: 39.6134°N 104.8962°W
- Owner: Regional Transportation District
- Line: Southeast Corridor
- Platforms: 1 island platform, 1 side platform
- Tracks: 2
- Connections: RTD Bus: Orchard FlexRide

Construction
- Parking: 48 spaces
- Cycle facilities: 6 racks
- Accessible: Yes

History
- Opened: November 17, 2006

Passengers
- 2025: 508 (average daily)
- Rank: 58 out of 75

Services
Preceding station	RTD	Following station
Belleview toward Union Station	E Line	Arapahoe at Village Center toward RidgeGate Parkway
Belleview toward Peoria	R Line	Arapahoe at Village Center toward RidgeGate Parkway
Belleview toward Alameda	T Line	Arapahoe at Village Center toward Lincoln
Former services
Preceding station	RTD	Following station
Belleview toward 18th & California	F Line	Arapahoe at Village Center toward RidgeGate Parkway
Belleview toward Nine Mile	G Line (2006–2009)	Arapahoe at Village Center toward Lincoln
Location

Orchard station is a light rail station in Greenwood Village, Colorado. It is operated by the Regional Transportation District (RTD), and was opened on November 17, 2006. It is currently served by the E, R, and T Lines.

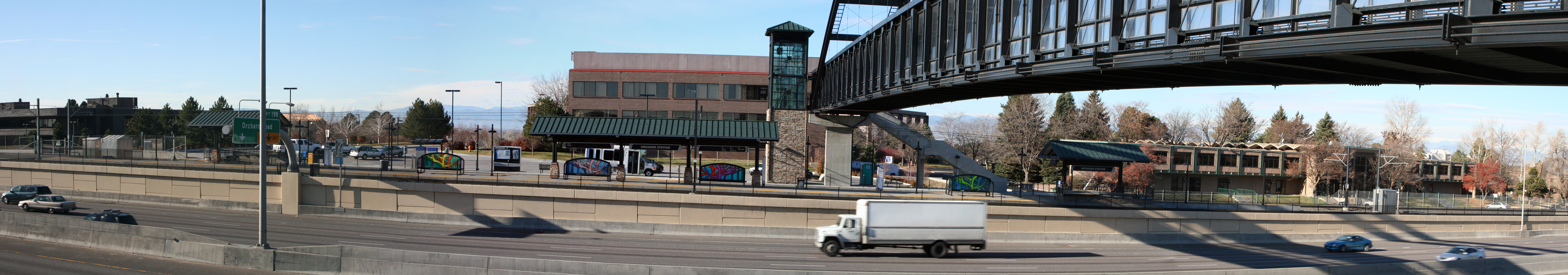
A panorama of the Orchard RTD station as viewed from across Interstate 25. The view includes part of the pedestrian bridge that provides access to the other side of the freeway from the station.

== Station layout ==
2F
Pedestrian bridge
1F

Platform Level

DTC Parkway
I-25
Northbound
← toward Union Station (Belleview)
← toward Peoria (Belleview)
← toward Alameda (Belleview)
Island platform, northbound only; doors will open on the left
Southbound
toward RidgeGate Parkway (Arapahoe at Village Center) →
toward Lincoln (Arapahoe at Village Center) →
Side platform, southbound only; doors will open on the right
Greenwood Plaza Boulevard; bus bays; parking

The station's parking and bus bays are located on the west side of the station. A pedestrian bridge over Interstate 25 connects to offices and residences along DTC Parkway.

The station features a public art installation of stamped concrete illustrating magnified apple leaves and stainless steel birds entitled Orchard Memory. It was created by Wopo Holup and dedicated in 2006.
