= University of Denver station =

Light rail station in Denver, Colorado

University of Denver
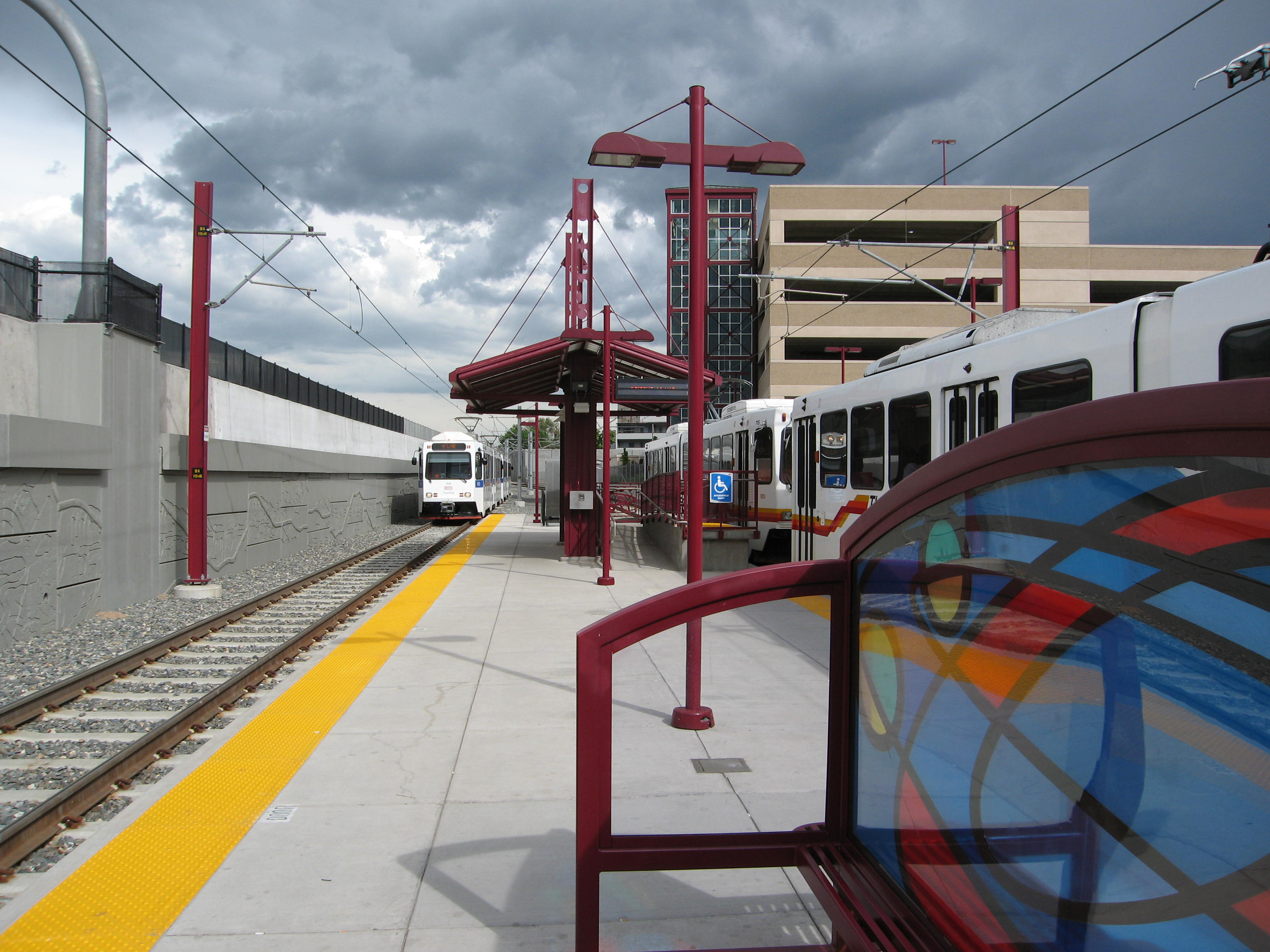
- University of Denver station platform facing east

General information
- Location: 1901 South Buchtel Boulevard; Denver, Colorado
- Coordinates: 39°41′6.94″N 104°57′52.8″W
- Owner: Regional Transportation District
- Line: Southeast Corridor
- Platforms: 1 island platform, 1 side platform
- Tracks: 2
- Connections: RTD Bus: 24

Construction
- Structure type: At-grade
- Parking: 540 spaces
- Cycle facilities: 10 racks, 12 lockers
- Accessible: Yes

History
- Opened: November 17, 2006

Passengers
- 2025: 999 (average daily)
- Rank: 36 out of 75

Services
Preceding station	RTD	Following station
Louisiana–Pearl toward Union Station	E Line	Colorado toward RidgeGate Parkway
Louisiana–Pearl toward Alameda	T Line	Colorado toward Lincoln
Former services
Preceding station	RTD	Following station
Louisiana–Pearl toward 18th & California	F Line	Colorado toward RidgeGate Parkway
Future services
Preceding station	RTD	Following station
Louisiana–Pearl toward 18th & California/Stout	H Line Suspended	Colorado toward Florida
Location

University of Denver station is a light rail station in Denver, Colorado, United States. It is operated by the Regional Transportation District (RTD), and was opened on November 17, 2006. The station is currently served by the E and T Lines.

University of Denver is typically served by the H Line, which is currently suspended due to the Downtown Rail Reconstruction Project. When complete, H Line service will be restored and the T Line will be eliminated.

== Station layout ==
1F

Platform Level

I-25
Northbound
← toward Union Station (Louisiana & Pearl)
← toward Alameda (Louisiana & Pearl)
Island platform, northbound only; doors will open on the left
Southbound
toward RidgeGate Parkway (Colorado) →
toward Lincoln (Colorado) →
Side platform, southbound only; doors will open on the right
South Buchtel Boulevard; bus bays; parking

As its name suggests, the station serves the University of Denver. It is located at the north end of campus on Buchtel Boulevard at High Street, across from the Ritchie Center.

The station features a public art installation entitled Reflective Discourse, consisting of a series of blue steel panels with cut-out words along the length of the station. It was created by John Goe and dedicated in 2006.
