= Park Meadows =

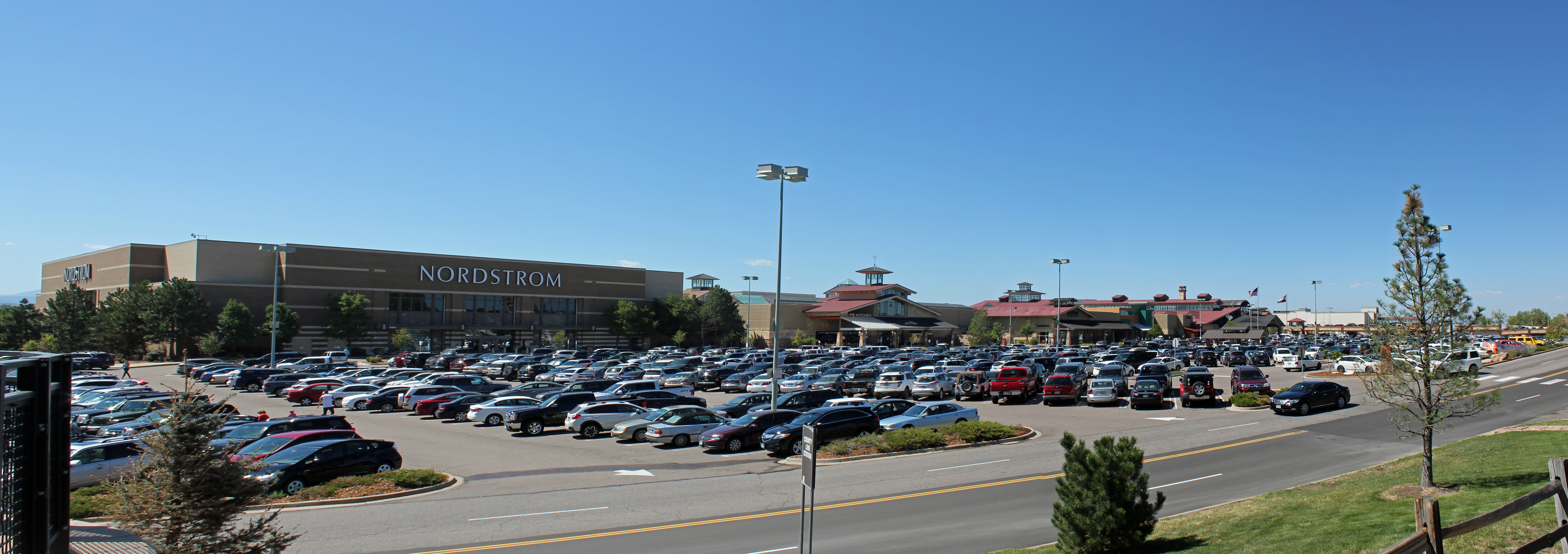
- The exterior of the mall in 2015
- Location: Lone Tree, Colorado, United States
- Coordinates: 39°33′45″N 104°52′35″W
- Address: 8401 Park Meadows Center Drive
- Opened: August 30, 1996; 30 years ago
- Developer: TrizecHahn Corporation
- Manager: GGP
- Owner: GGP
- Num. of stores: 193
- Num. of anchor tenants: 5
- Floor area: 1,576,618 square feet (150,000 m^{2})
- Floors: 2 (3 in Dillard's, JCPenney, Macy's, and Nordstrom, 5 in parking garage)
- Public transit: County Line (RTD)
- Website: www.parkmeadows.com/en.html

Park Meadows is an enclosed shopping mall in Lone Tree, Colorado, that includes a gross leasable area of 1,576,618 square feet (150,000 m^{2}). Opened on August 30, 1996, the mall features JCPenney, Macy's, Dillard's, Nordstrom, and Dick's Sporting Goods.

== History ==
Park Meadows opened in 1996 with Dillard's, and the first Nordstrom in the state of Colorado. Both Foley's (now Macy's) and Joslins opened at the mall in 1997, and JCPenney opened in 1999. It became the largest mall in the Denver metropolitan area.

When Dillard's bought the Joslins chain in 1998, the Park Meadows store was sold to Lord & Taylor, which opened in 1999. TrizecHahn (formerly The Hahn Company), who built the mall, sold it to The Rouse Company the same year following the liquidation of TrizecHahn from the shopping mall industry. A movie theater opened by United Artists closed in 2000 and became Galyan's, now Dick's Sporting Goods.

Lord & Taylor was repositioned and shuttered in 2004. Also that year, General Growth Properties acquired the mall when it bought Rouse's portfolio. In 2006, the previous Lord & Taylor outpost was razed for an outdoor promenade.

Borders Books & Music, a tenant of the outdoor section, ceased operations in 2011. A year later Forever 21 opened in its place. In 2025, they would cease operations too.

By 2023, since the government lockdowns, Park Meadows had announced several newest additions, among them are Windsor, Psycho Bunny, Vuori, Blue Nile, Johnny Was, Volcom, and Warby Parker.

== Anchors ==
=== Current ===
- The Container Store (periphery)
- Sandbox VR
- Dick's Sporting Goods (former United Artists Theatre)
- Dillard's
- Epic Mountain Gear (periphery)
- JCPenney
- Macy's
- Nordstrom
- PetSmart (periphery)
- The Lego Store

=== Former ===
- Border's Books & Music
- Forever XXI
- Foley's (now Macy's)
- Lord and Taylor, formerly Joslin's (demolished)
- United Artists Theatre
- Disney Store
