= Lone Tree City Center station =

Light rail station in Lone Tree, Colorado

Lone Tree City Center
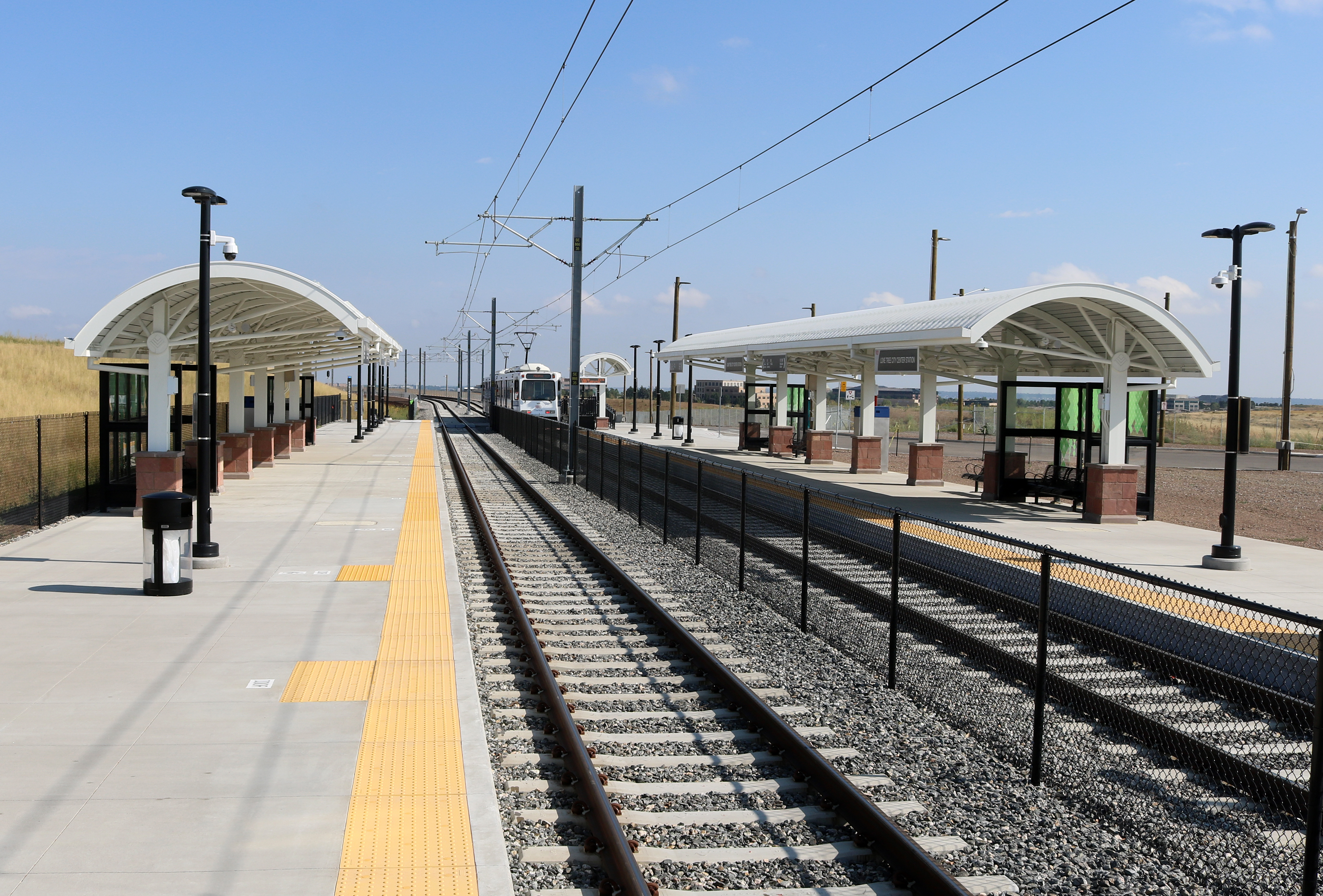
- Lone Tree City Center station platform

General information
- Location: 11023 RidgeGate Parkway; Lone Tree, Colorado
- Coordinates: 39°31′39″N 104°51′48″W
- Owner: Regional Transportation District
- Line: Southeast Rail Extension
- Platforms: 2 side platforms
- Tracks: 2

Construction
- Structure type: At-grade
- Accessible: Yes

History
- Opened: May 17, 2019

Passengers
- 2019: 20 (average daily)
- Rank: 75 out of 75

Services
| Preceding station | RTD | Following station |
|---|---|---|
| Sky Ridge toward Union Station | E Line | RidgeGate Parkway Terminus |
| Sky Ridge toward Peoria | R Line | RidgeGate Parkway Terminus |
Former services
| Preceding station | RTD | Following station |
|---|---|---|
| Sky Ridge toward 18th & California | F Line | RidgeGate Parkway Terminus |
Location

Lone Tree City Center station is a light rail station in Lone Tree, Colorado. It is operated by the Regional Transportation District (RTD), and was opened on May 17, 2019. It is currently served by the E and R Lines.

== Station layout ==
1F

Platform Level

Private drive
Side platform, doors will open on the right
Northbound
← toward Union Station (Sky Ridge)
← toward Peoria (Sky Ridge)
Southbound
toward RidgeGate Parkway (Terminus) →
Side platform, doors will open on the right

The station has been served by the E Line since its opening, and was briefly served by the R Line until 2020 when service was discontinued due to the COVID-19 pandemic. As of September 2026, R Line service has been temporarily restored as a part of service changes accommodating the Downtown Rail Reconstruction Project. R Line service will be truncated back to its usual terminus at Lincoln when the project is complete.

The station sits in greenfield land that is planned to host a transit-oriented development. The proposed 400-acre (160 ha) Lone Tree City Center, for which the station is named, is planned to include 10,000 homes, office space, and parks. The development project was approved in 2018; however, as of 2026 there has been no progress and the land surrounding the station remains entirely undeveloped. The station is fenced off from the greenfield land surrounding it and a private drive leads back to Sky Ridge station to the north. Transit advocacy groups have called for the station's closure until the surrounding land is developed, as "there is currently no reason for anyone to get off the train here."

Lone Tree City Center is by far the least-used RTD rail station, with a daily average of 20 passengers using the station.
