= Sky Ridge Medical Center =

Colorado hospital, founded 2003

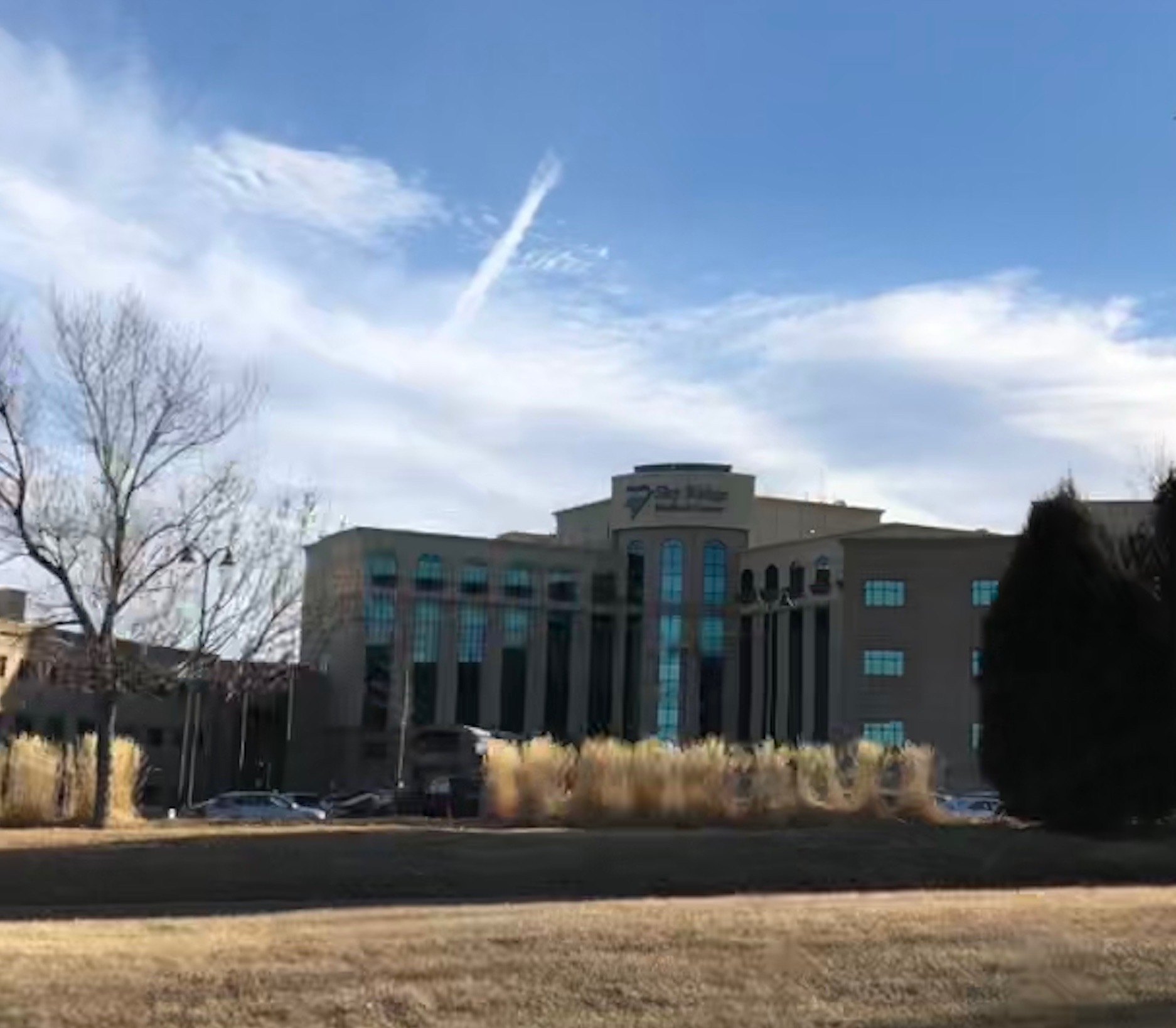

Geography
- Location: Lone Tree, Denver Metropolitan Area, Colorado, U.S.
- Coordinates: 39.528908°N 104.873939°W

Organisation
- Network: HealthONE Colorado, HCA

Services
- Emergency department: Level II acute care, Level III NICU
- Beds: 284

Helipads
- Helipad: Yes

History
- Founded: 2003

Links
- Website: skyridgemedcenter.com
- Other links: Hospitals in Colorado

Sky Ridge Medical Center is a medical complex located in Lone Tree, Colorado, United States. Opened in 2003, the hospital provides multiple 24 hour, daily services. In 2018, U.S. News & World Report rated Sky Ridge as tied for sixth-best hospital in Colorado.

== History ==
After agitation from a group called the Douglas County Healthcare Task Force and support from HCA and HealthONE, Sky Ridge Medical Center opened in 2003. The two original structures, the Aspen and Conifer Buildings, were completed in 2002 and 2003 respectively. In 2006, Sky Ridge Medical Center sued the City of Lone Tree over $450,000 that the hospital claimed was over-paid in taxes.

In 2008, four local members of John McCain's 2008 presidential campaign self-transported to Sky Ridge after receiving a threatening letter with a suspicious substance enclosed. No injuries were reported in the incident, which resulted in a haz-mat response that cleared the substance as not dangerous.

On 17 May 2019, the RTD light rail Sky Ridge station opened as part of a $223 million, 2.3-mile (3.7 km) extension through RidgeGate and across I-25. The station was accompanied by the addition of public artwork to a green area between the station and the hospital.

== Services ==
Sky Ridge Medical Center contains both hospital services as well as private suites rented by other medical groups that provide specialized services.

Available services:

- Pediatric emergency room
- Adult emergency room
- AirLife
- Pharmacy
- Geriatrics
- Orthopedics
- Pulmonology

The University of Colorado South Denver offers undergraduate clinical experience at Sky Ridge alongside the School of Nursing located at the University of Colorado's Anschutz Campus.
