= T Line (RTD) =

Temporary light rail line in the Denver metropolitan area

Overview
- Owner: Regional Transportation District
- Locale: Denver metropolitan area
- Termini: Alameda; Lincoln
- Stations: 12

Service
- Type: Light rail
- System: RTD Rail
- Operator: Regional Transportation District
- Rolling stock: Siemens SD100 & SD160

History
- Opened: June 7, 2026

Technical
- Track gauge: 4 ft 8 1/2 in (1,435 mm) standard gauge
- Electrification: Overhead line, 750 V DC

The T Line is a Regional Transportation District (RTD) light rail line that serves stations in Denver, Greenwood Village, Centennial, and Lone Tree, Colorado. The line began service on June 7, 2026, as a part of several service changes in order to accommodate a major rail construction project in downtown Denver. It is colored red on system maps.

The line was introduced as a result of the H Line being suspended due to the aforementioned rail construction project. RTD considers the service temporary (hence the "T" Line designation), and it is planned to be discontinued once H Line service is restored.

== Route ==
The T Line's northern terminus is at Alameda station, in Denver's Baker neighborhood. It follows the C and E Lines south to I-25 & Broadway, where the C Line diverges. The E and T Lines depart the station on a flyover and parallel Interstate 25 to the southeast. The R Line joins at I-25's interchange with Interstate 225 in southeast Denver. The three lines travel together through Denver's southeast suburbs to the T Line's terminus at Lincoln station.

The T Line's entire route is shared with the E Line, and it is a supplemental service along the Southeast Corridor in order to replace service frequency lost by the suspension of the H Line.

== History ==
RTD had previously altered light rail service in the summers of 2024 and 2025 in order to rebuild trackage in the Downtown Loop and on Colfax Avenue, which dated from the opening of the light rail system in 1994. During these first two phases of the project, referred to by the agency as the Downtown Rail Reconstruction Project, the D Line's northern terminus was re-routed to Union Station, following the former route of the C Line while retaining the D Line designation. The H Line was truncated to only serve stations in Aurora, with a connection to Denver via the E Line at Southmoor. The L Line was suspended, as all of the stations along its route were affected by the rail reconstruction project.

RTD implemented service changes to accommodate the third phase of the project on June 7, 2026. In this phase, the D, H, and L Lines were all suspended, and the C Line was temporarily re-instated along the Littleton-Union Station corridor. In order to replace service frequency in south Denver lost by the suspension of the H Line, RTD introduced the T Line as a temporary service and R Line service was extended back to its former terminus at RidgeGate Parkway station.

RTD extended the T Line's northern terminus one stop north to Alameda station in September 2026. In addition, the temporary re-instatement of the C Line from June was made permanent, with the D Line discontinued. Unlike the C Line, the T Line will remain a temporary service pattern and is planned to be eliminated once the Downtown Rail Reconstruction Project is complete.

== Stations ==
The T Line's entire route is shared with the E Line.

Station	Municipality	Opened	Connections & notes
Alameda	Denver	October 8, 1994	3, 4, 52, ART
I-25 & Broadway	Denver	October 8, 1994	0, 0L, 11, 14; Park and ride: 988 spaces
Louisiana–Pearl	Denver	November 17, 2006	11, 12
University of Denver	Denver	November 17, 2006	24; Park and ride: 540 spaces
Colorado	Denver	November 17, 2006	21, 40, 46; Park and ride: 363 spaces
Yale	Denver	November 17, 2006	46; Park and ride: 129 spaces
Southmoor	Denver	November 17, 2006	35, 40, 46, 65, 105; Park and ride: 788 spaces
Belleview	Denver	November 17, 2006	73; Park and ride: 59 spaces
Orchard	Greenwood Village	November 17, 2006	Park and ride: 48 spaces
Arapahoe at Village Center	Greenwood Village	November 17, 2006	66, 153, 169, AT, ATA; Park and ride: 817 spaces
Dry Creek	Centennial	November 17, 2006	Park and ride: 235 spaces
County Line	Lone Tree	November 17, 2006	402L; Park and ride: 388 spaces
Lincoln	Lone Tree	November 17, 2006	483; Park and ride: 1,734 spaces
