= County Line station (RTD) =

Light rail station in Lone Tree, Colorado

County Line
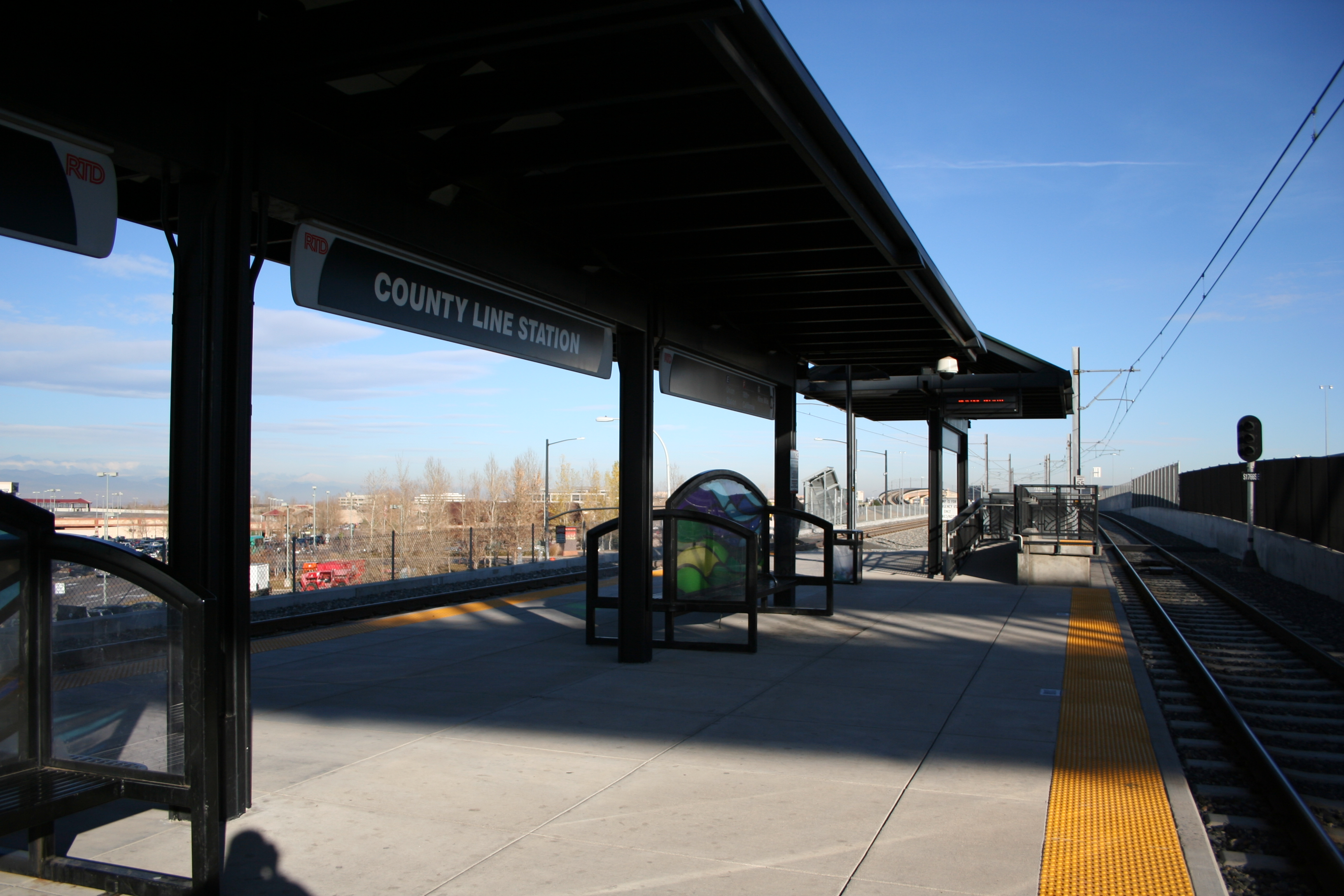
- County Line station platform

General information
- Location: 8340 South Valley Highway; Lone Tree, Colorado
- Coordinates: 39.562°N 104.8722°W
- Owner: Regional Transportation District
- Line: Southeast Corridor
- Platforms: 1 island platform
- Tracks: 2
- Connections: RTD Bus: 402L, Inverness South FlexRide, Lone Tree FlexRide

Construction
- Structure type: Elevated
- Parking: 388 spaces
- Cycle facilities: 8 racks, 16 lockers
- Accessible: Yes

History
- Opened: November 17, 2006

Passengers
- 2025: 880 (average daily)
- Rank: 40 out of 75

Services
Preceding station	RTD	Following station
Dry Creek toward Union Station	E Line	Lincoln toward RidgeGate Parkway
Dry Creek toward Peoria	R Line	Lincoln toward RidgeGate Parkway
Dry Creek toward Alameda	T Line	Lincoln Terminus
Former services
Preceding station	RTD	Following station
Dry Creek toward 18th & California	F Line	Lincoln toward RidgeGate Parkway
Dry Creek toward Nine Mile	G Line (2006–2009)	Lincoln Terminus
Location

County Line station is a light rail station in Lone Tree, Colorado. It is operated by the Regional Transportation District (RTD), and was opened on November 17, 2006. It is currently served by the E, R, and T Lines.

== Station layout ==
3F
Pedestrian bridge
2F

Platform Level

Parking
I-25
Northbound
← toward Union Station (Dry Creek)
← toward Peoria (Dry Creek)
← toward Alameda (Dry Creek)
Island platform, doors will open on the left
Southbound
toward RidgeGate Parkway (Lincoln) →
toward Lincoln (Terminus) →
1F
Park Meadows Mall; Park Meadows Center Drive; bus bays

Park Meadows Mall and bus bays are located immediately west of the station, along Park Meadows Center Drive; the station did not allow direct pedestrian access to the mall until 2008. Parking is located east of the station across Interstate 25, accessible via the pedestrian bridge.

The station features a public art sculpture entitled Plow, created by Emmett Culligan and dedicated in 2006.
