= Ira Sherman =

American-born sculptor (born 1950)

Ira D. Sherman (born 1950) is an American-born sculptor.

Sherman's sculptural work uses materials and shapes from science and technology, yet “bio-engineered” to interact with the audience or viewer in a uniquely human way. Many of Sherman’s pieces are, in fact, "prostheses" created around a humorous social concept. These are worn on the body, and may be very intimate. Many of Sherman’s sculptures have sensors that let them interact with the participant or the audience. Parts of his current travelling exhibitions, "Panaceas to Persistent Problems" and "Impenetrable Devices" have been displayed in exhibitions in the U.S., Canada, Europe, Israel and Japan; the Spertus Museum in Chicago, and the Smithsonian Renwick Gallery of the National Museum of American Art have recently acquired Sherman art work for their permanent collections.

Sherman's sculpture "Stange Machine," is also on permanent display at the Louisiana Street Station of the Denver Light Rail system.
