= University of Colorado South Denver =

Public university in Lone Tree, Colorado

Coordinates: 39°32′08″N 104°50′40″W

- Active: 2015–2021
- Location: 10035 S. Peoria St., Lone Tree, Colorado, 80134, US
- Colors: Black & Gold
- Website: http://southdenver.cu.edu

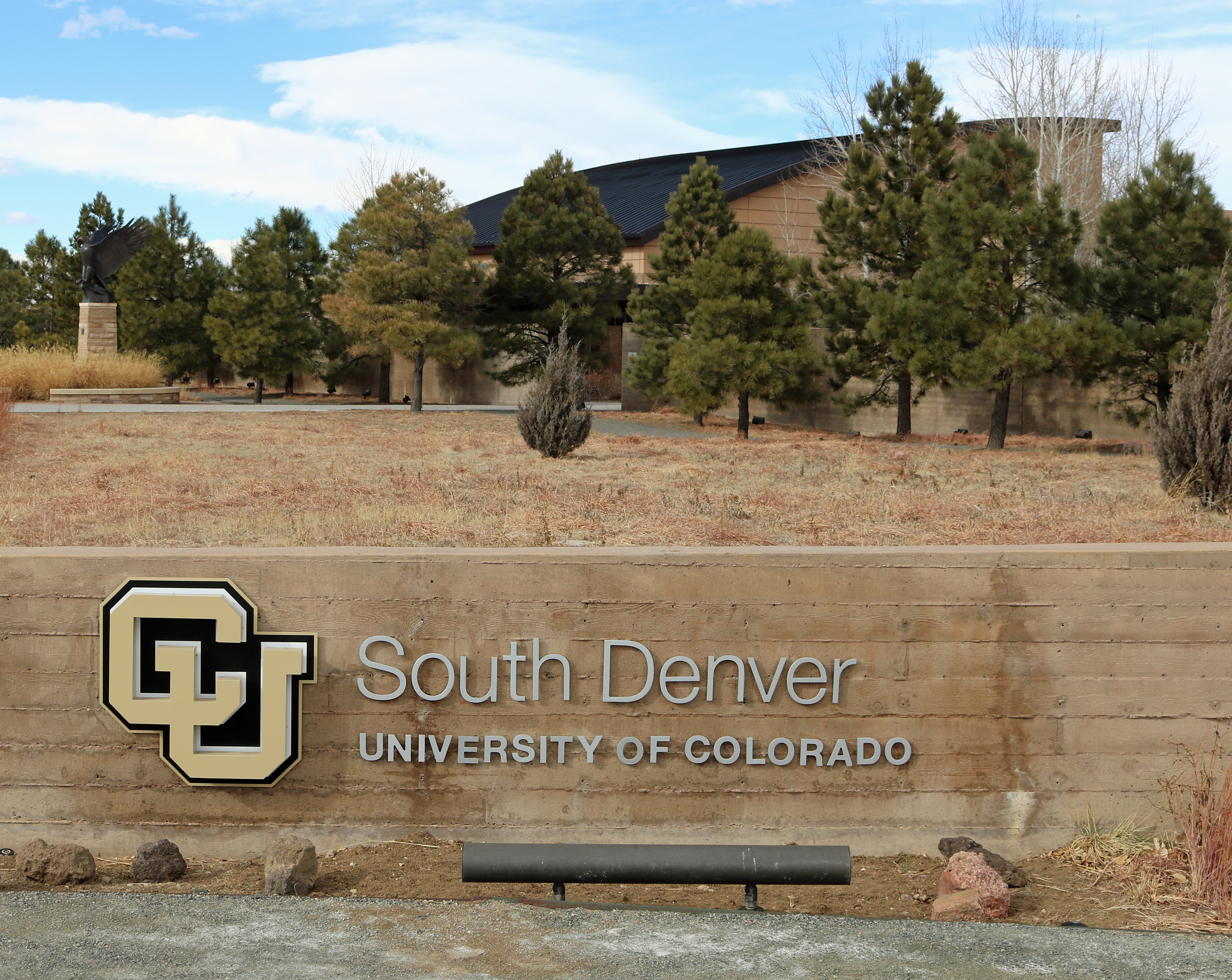
CU South Denver sign at the back of the campus

University of Colorado South Denver, also known as CU South Denver, was a public university located in Lone Tree, Colorado, United States, about 10 miles (16 km) south of Denver. Opened in 2014 as an extension of the University of Colorado, it was located on the property of The Wildlife Experience, which was incorporated as part of the University. Classes were offered for degree-seeking and continuing education students and included courses in nursing, engineering, education and business.

In September 2020, due to shifting market conditions and the COVID-19 pandemic, it was announced that CU South Denver would cease taking new students and fully close in 2021 with the property to be sold.

== Wildlife Experience ==
The Wildlife Experience is operated as part of the University of Colorado South Denver and includes an art and natural history museum and a large-screen movie theater. The museum offers community and K-12 museum education programs. The Wildlife Experience museum houses an extensive collection of natural history exhibits, paintings and sculpture, photography and large-format films. Rotating exhibits are devoted to wildlife conservation efforts and present a wide range of wildlife subjects, themes and learning experiences.

Effective January 2015, The Wildlife Experience was donated to the University of Colorado. The collaboration between the University of Colorado and The Wildlife Experience began in April 2014 with 11,000 square feet (1,000 m^{2}) of the natural history museum and art gallery scheduled for renovation. Since then, an upstairs gallery space has been transformed into two classrooms, a computer lab and a student and faculty resource center. Expansive storage space in the lower level has been converted into a state-of-the-art nursing simulation lab.

The campus is now under the control of the University of Colorado and known as the University of Colorado South Denver.

== Extreme Screen Theater ==
The campus features a 2,700-square-foot (250 m^{2}) screen designed by Iwerks Entertainment. The screen is composed of a "proprietary reflective material", and is contained in a wheelchair accessible, 315-seat theater.
