= E Line (RTD) =

Light rail line in the Denver metropolitan area

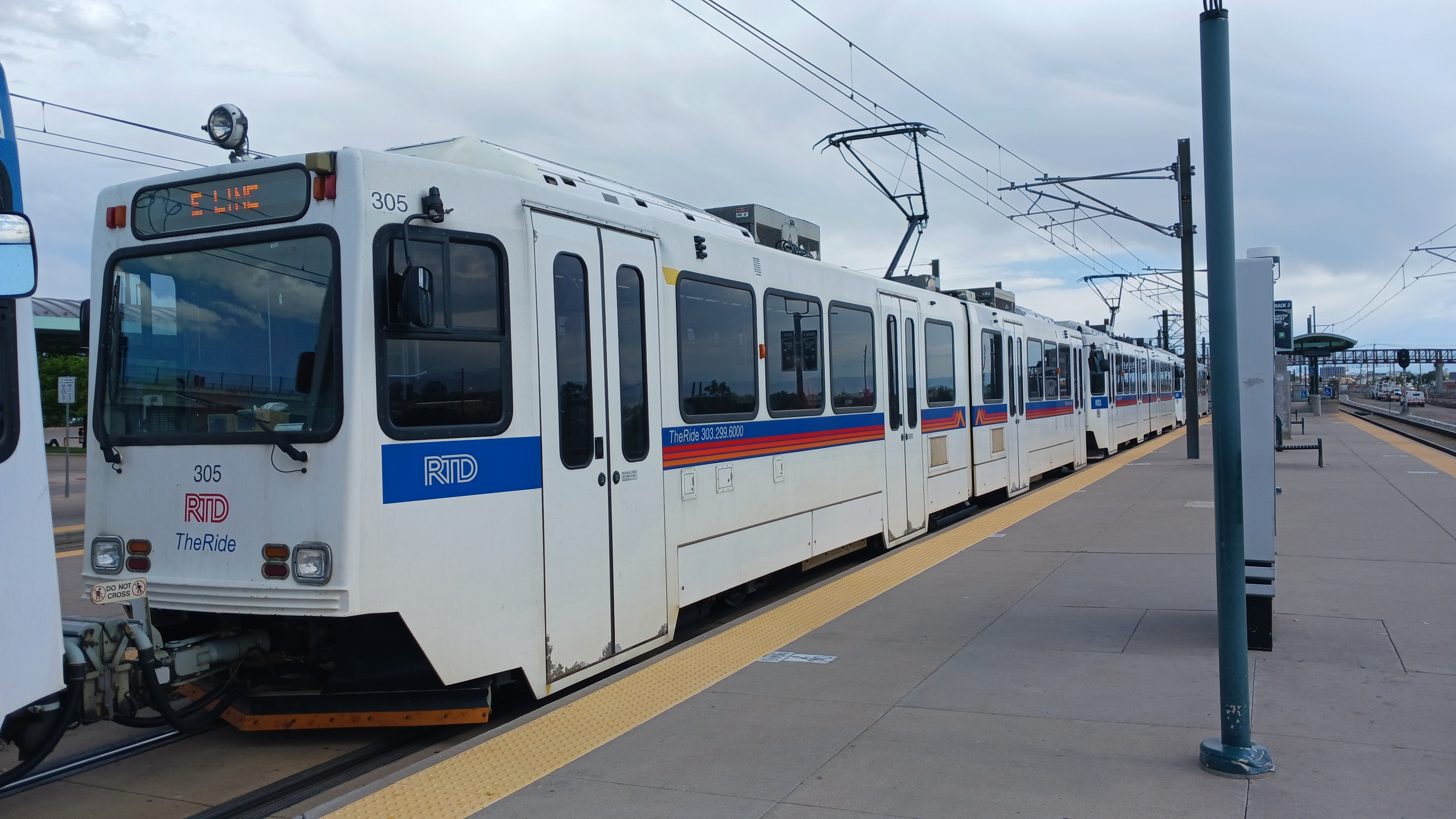
- Southbound E Line at I-25 & Broadway station

Overview
- Other name: Southeast Line
- Owner: Regional Transportation District
- Locale: Denver metropolitan area
- Termini: Union Station; RidgeGate Parkway
- Stations: 21

Service
- Type: Light rail
- System: RTD Rail
- Operator: Regional Transportation District
- Ridership: 3,233,000 (FY2023, annual)

History
- Opened: November 17, 2006

Technical
- Track gauge: 4 ft 8 1/2 in (1,435 mm) standard gauge
- Electrification: Overhead line, 750 V DC
Route map
E Line highlighted in purple

The E Line is a Regional Transportation District (RTD) light rail line that serves stations in Denver, Greenwood Village, Centennial, and Lone Tree, Colorado. The line began service on November 17, 2006, with the completion of the Southeast Line as part of the T-REX Project. It is colored dark purple on system maps.

It is one of three routes that are part of the RTD's service plan for the corridor, alongside the H and R Lines.

== Route ==
The E Line's northern terminus is at Union Station in downtown Denver, shared with the C and W Lines. South of Auraria West station, the W Line diverges toward Golden while the H Line joins from the downtown loop. The three lines travel together to I-25 & Broadway, where the E and H Lines diverge from the C Line onto a flyover. The E Line parallels Interstate 25 from this point to its southern terminus at RidgeGate Parkway station in Lone Tree. At I-25's interchange with Interstate 225, the H Line diverges toward Aurora while the R Line joins from Aurora. The R Line's southern terminus is at Lincoln station, leaving the E Line's southernmost three stations as the only ones exclusive to it.

The E Line is the busiest light rail route in RTD's network, with annual ridership exceeding 3 million as of 2023.

== History ==
From its opening in 2006 until 2020, all E Line stations south of 10th & Osage station were shared with the F Line. The F Line was a fourth route serving the Southeast Corridor and was a direct link between Denver's southeast suburbs and the downtown loop, diverging toward it with the H Line. The F Line was extended to RidgeGate Parkway along with the E and R Lines in 2019; however, the line was suspended in 2020 due to the COVID-19 pandemic. It never returned to service and was officially eliminated in 2023. The R Line's southern terminus was also cut back to Lincoln station due to the pandemic, where it remains as of 2026.

In June 2026, R Line service to RidgeGate Parkway was restored due to the Downtown Rail Reconstruction Project. This project prompted the suspension of the H Line for construction, with increased service on the R Line and a temporary "T Line" replacing H Line capacity. This service change is temporary and the R Line's southern terminus will return to Lincoln when complete.

== Stations ==
Station	Municipality	Opened	Connections & notes
Union Station	Denver	April 5, 2002	16th Street FreeRide, MetroRide, LYNX, 0, 9, 10, 15, 19, 20, 120X, LD1, LX2, FF1, FF2, FF3; California Zephyr
Ball Arena–Elitch Gardens	Denver	April 5, 2002	Mainline rail interchange
Empower Field at Mile High	Denver	April 5, 2002	Mainline rail interchange
Auraria West	Denver	April 5, 2002	Mainline rail interchange
10th & Osage	Denver	October 8, 1994	Mainline rail interchange
Alameda	Denver	October 8, 1994	3, 4, 52, ART
I-25 & Broadway	Denver	October 8, 1994	0, 0L, 11, 14; Park and ride: 988 spaces
Louisiana–Pearl	Denver	November 17, 2006	11, 12
University of Denver	Denver	November 17, 2006	24; Park and ride: 540 spaces
Colorado	Denver	November 17, 2006	21, 40, 46; Park and ride: 363 spaces
Yale	Denver	November 17, 2006	46; Park and ride: 129 spaces
Southmoor	Denver	November 17, 2006	35, 40, 46, 65, 105; Park and ride: 788 spaces
Belleview	Denver	November 17, 2006	73; Park and ride: 59 spaces
Orchard	Greenwood Village	November 17, 2006	Park and ride: 48 spaces
Arapahoe at Village Center	Greenwood Village	November 17, 2006	66, 153, 169, AT, ATA; Park and ride: 817 spaces
Dry Creek	Centennial	November 17, 2006	Park and ride: 235 spaces
County Line	Lone Tree	November 17, 2006	402L; Park and ride: 388 spaces
Lincoln	Lone Tree	November 17, 2006	483; Park and ride: 1,734 spaces
Sky Ridge	Lone Tree	May 17, 2019	Mainline rail interchange
Lone Tree City Center	Lone Tree	May 17, 2019	Mainline rail interchange
RidgeGate Parkway	Lone Tree	May 17, 2019	Park and ride: 1,300 spaces

== FasTracks ==
The 2004 voter-approved FasTracks initiative included the Southeast Corridor extension for the E and F Line, which extended the lines by 2.3 mi (3.70 km) to southern Lone Tree. The extension cost $223 million to construct and was opened on May 17, 2019. It included three new stations, Sky Ridge, Lone Tree City Center, and RidgeGate Parkway, the latter with a 1,300-stall parking facility.
