= Sky Ridge station =

Light rail station in Lone Tree, Colorado

Sky Ridge
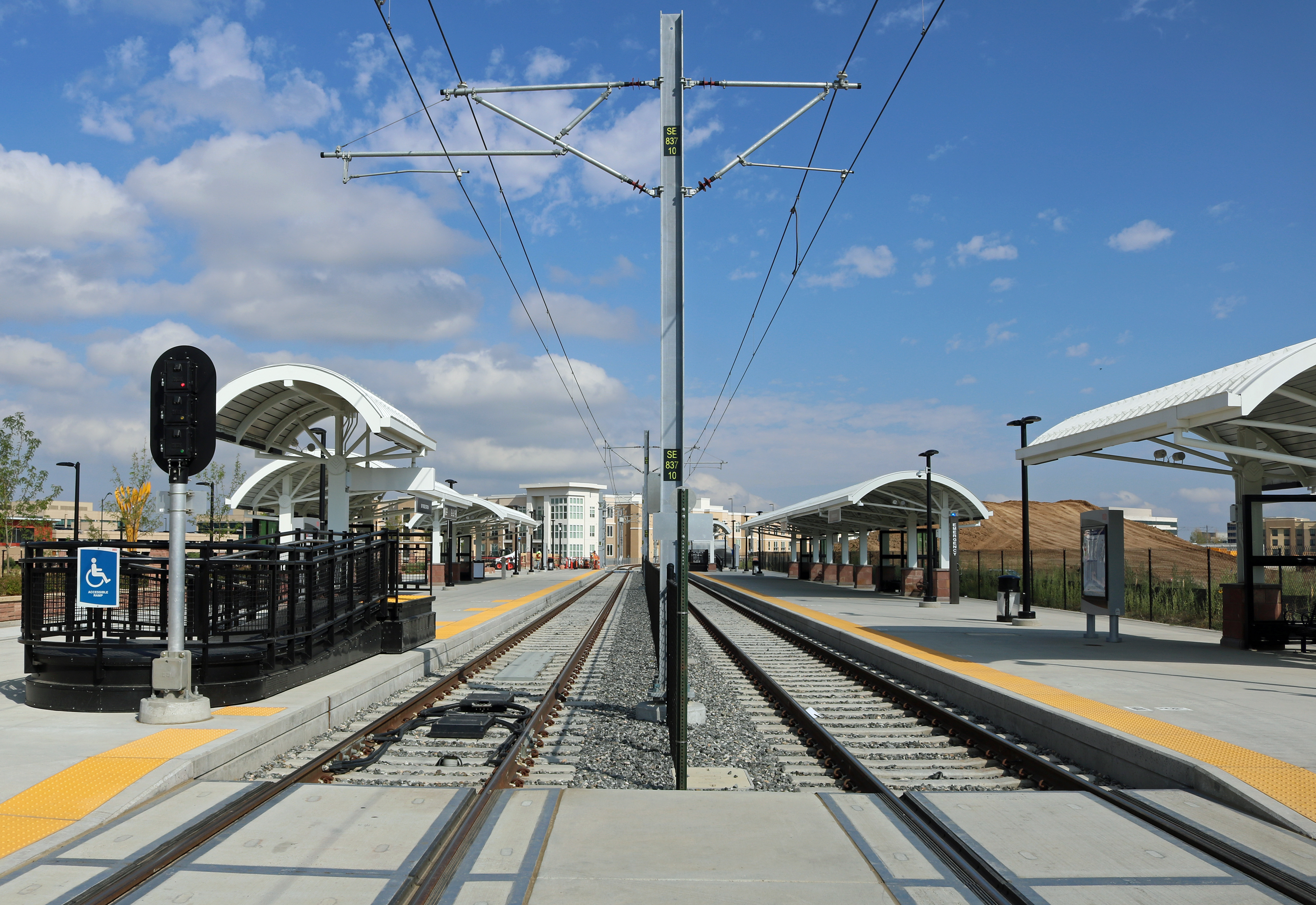
- Sky Ridge station platforms in 2019

General information
- Location: 9941 Trainstation Circle; Lone Tree, Colorado
- Coordinates: 39°31′56″N 104°52′13″W
- Owner: Regional Transportation District
- Line: Southeast Rail Extension
- Platforms: 2 side platforms
- Tracks: 2
- Connections: Bustang: South Line; RTD Bus: Lone Tree FlexRide

Construction
- Structure type: At-grade
- Cycle facilities: 10 racks
- Accessible: yes

History
- Opened: May 17, 2019

Passengers
- 2025: 305 (average daily)
- Rank: 67 out of 75

Services
Preceding station	RTD	Following station
Lincoln toward Union Station	E Line	Lone Tree City Center toward RidgeGate Parkway
Lincoln toward Peoria	R Line	Lone Tree City Center toward RidgeGate Parkway
Former services
Preceding station	RTD	Following station
Lincoln toward 18th & California	F Line	Lone Tree City Center toward RidgeGate Parkway
Location

Sky Ridge station is a light rail station in Lone Tree, Colorado. It is operated by the Regional Transportation District (RTD), and was opened on May 17, 2019. The station is currently served by the E and R Lines.

== Station layout ==
1F

Platform Level

Side platform, doors will open on the right
Northbound
← toward Union Station (Lincoln)
← toward Peoria (Lincoln)
Southbound
toward RidgeGate Parkway (Lone Tree City Center) →
Side platform, doors will open on the right
Sky Ridge Avenue; bus bays

The station consists of two side platforms located adjacent to the Sky Ridge Medical Center, near the intersection of Interstate 25 and Sky Ridge Avenue. The station has ten bicycle racks. The station has been served by the E Line since its opening, and was briefly served by the R Line until 2020 when service was discontinued due to the COVID-19 pandemic.

As of September 2026, R Line service has been temporarily restored as a part of service changes accommodating the Downtown Rail Reconstruction Project. R Line service will be truncated back to its usual terminus at Lincoln when the project is complete.
