= Lone Tree, Colorado =

City in Colorado, United States

- Home rule city
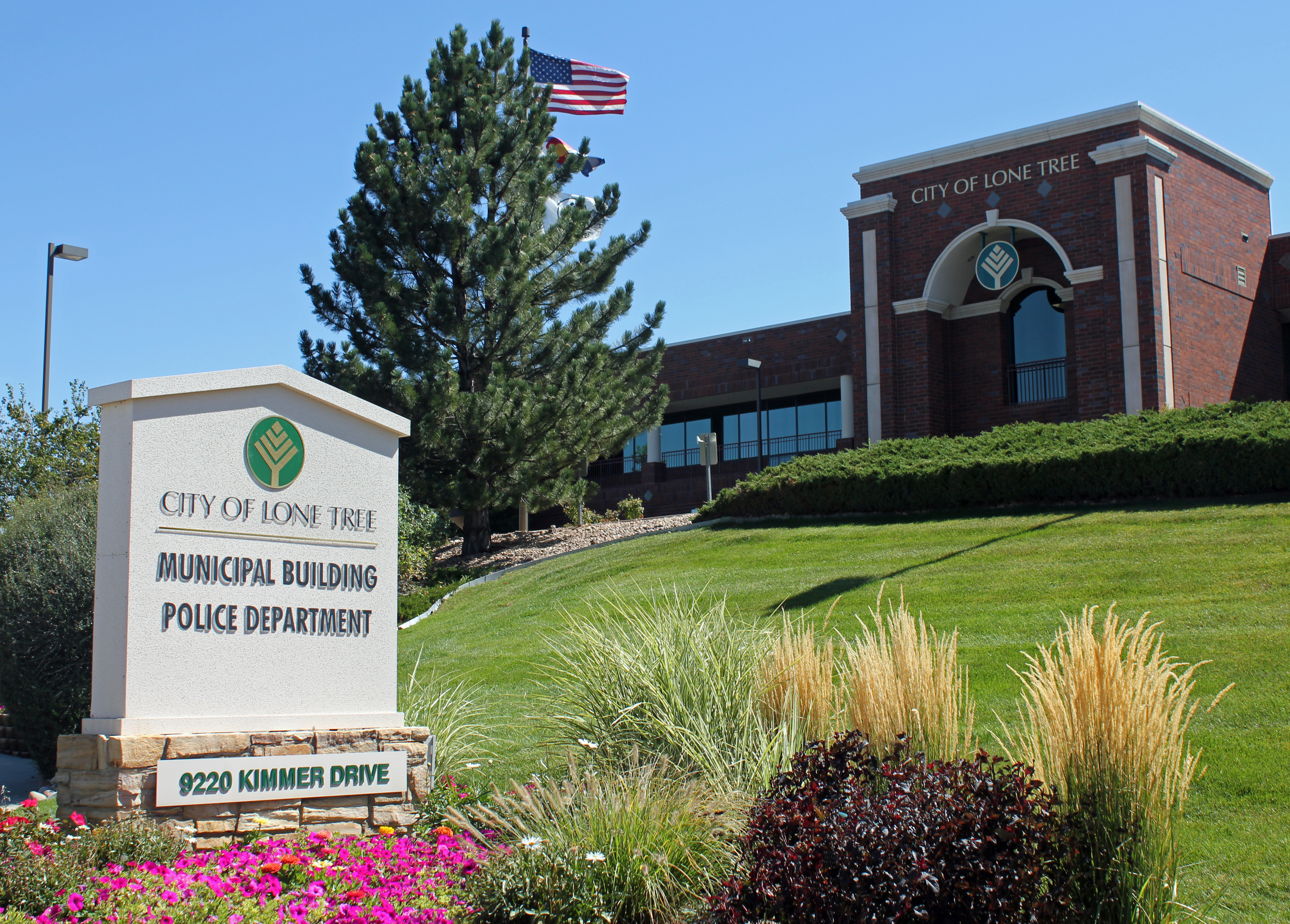
- Lone Tree Municipal Building

- Flag
- Motto: Deep Roots: New Heights
- Interactive map of Lone Tree, Colorado
- Location within Colorado
- Coordinates: 39°32′04″N 104°53′16″W
- Country: United States
- State: Colorado
- County: Douglas County
- Incorporated (city): November 1995
- Incorporated (home rule city): May 5, 1998

Government
  - Type: Mayor–Council

Area
  - Total: 9.809 sq mi (25.406 km^{2})
  - Land: 9.809 sq mi (25.406 km^{2})
  - Water: 0 sq mi (0.000 km^{2})
- Elevation: 6,280 ft (1,910 m)

Population (2020)
  - Total: 14,253
  - Estimate (2025): 15,278
  - Density: 1,453.0/sq mi (561.01/km^{2})
- Time zone: UTC–7 (Mountain (MST))
  - Summer (DST): UTC–6 (MDT)
- ZIP Codes: 80112, 80124, 80134
- Area codes: 303, 720, and 983
- GNIS feature ID: 2410864
- FIPS code: 08-45955
- Website: cityoflonetree.com

Lone Tree is a home rule city located in northern Douglas County, Colorado, United States. The population was 14,253 as of the 2020 census, and was estimated to be 15,278 in 2025.

Lone Tree is a part of the Denver metropolitan area.

== History ==
The area that is now Lone Tree was home to nomadic indigenous peoples including the Arapaho, Cheyenne, and Ute before European settlement. Austrian immigrant brothers John, Joseph, and Jacob Schweiger established a homestead in 1874 that would become Schweiger Ranch, among the area's earliest European settlements.

The modern city traces its origins to Memorial Day weekend 1982, when a new residential subdivision opened with nine households. Residents organized as the Lone Tree Homeowners Association and, lacking local governance as part of unincorporated Douglas County, grew increasingly frustrated with issues including unenforced zoning standards and absent infrastructure. By 1991 the area had grown to encompass 13 homeowners' associations but still lacked formal municipal authority.

In late 1994, community leaders began organizing toward incorporation, envisioning a first-class community with high design standards and carefully planned landscaping. In November 1995, residents voted 676 to 165 to incorporate as the City of Lone Tree. The first City Council meeting was held in June 1996, with Jack O'Boyle serving as the city's first mayor. Lone Tree became a home rule city in May 1998, governed by a Council-Manager form of government in which the Council sets city policy and the Manager is responsible for city operations.

The city's high design standards shaped its early development. When IKEA sought to build a location in Lone Tree, the city declined due to the company's signature blue and yellow exterior not meeting local standards; IKEA subsequently built in neighboring Centennial.

== Geography ==
According to the United States Census Bureau, the city has a total area of 9.810 square miles (25.41 km^{2}), all land.

Lone Tree is located on the northern border of Douglas County, directly adjacent to Arapahoe County, approximately 18 miles (29 km) south of downtown Denver. Neighboring communities include Centennial to the north, Highlands Ranch to the west, and Parker to the southeast. The Meridian International Business Center, a major office and business park, lies immediately north of the city in unincorporated Arapahoe County.

The city's terrain transitions from developed suburban areas in the north and west to the elevated grassland bluffs of Bluffs Regional Park in the south, which offer panoramic views of the Front Range from Longs Peak to Pikes Peak.

The city annexed the territory of the University of Colorado South Denver campus, the former site of The Wildlife Experience, in 2017. Following the university's closure in 2021, the Douglas County School District purchased the 14.1-acre property for $10.3 million and converted it into the Legacy Campus, a Career and Technical Education facility that opened in August 2023.

== Demographics ==
Historical population
Census	Pop.	Note	%±
2000	4,873		—
2010	10,218		109.7%
2020	14,253		39.5%
2025 (est.)	15,278		7.2%
U.S. Decennial Census; 2020 Census

According to realtor website Zillow, the average price of a home as of July 31, 2026, in Lone Tree was $882,478.

As of the 2024 American Community Survey, there were 6,507 estimated households in Lone Tree with an average of 2.17 persons per household. The city has a median household income of $123,741. Approximately 4.9% of the city's population lives at or below the poverty line. Lone Tree has an estimated 66.1% employment rate, with 71.2% of the population holding a bachelor's degree or higher and 98.9% holding a high school diploma. There were 6,798 housing units at an average density of 692.97 per square mile (267.56/km^{2}).

The top five reported languages (people were allowed to report up to two languages, thus the figures will generally add to more than 100%) were English (82.8%), Spanish (3.4%), Indo-European (7.1%), Asian and Pacific Islander (6.3%), and Other (0.3%).

The median age in the city was 41.5 years.

Lone Tree, Colorado – racial and ethnic composition Note: the US Census treats Hispanic/Latino as an ethnic category. This table excludes Latinos from the racial categories and assigns them to a separate category. Hispanics/Latinos may be of any race.
Race / ethnicity (NH = non-Hispanic)	Pop. 2000	Pop. 2010	Pop. 2020	% 2000	% 2010	% 2020
White alone (NH)	4,330	8,471	10,690	88.86%	82.90%	75.00%
Black or African American alone (NH)	69	158	255	1.42%	1.55%	1.79%
Native American or Alaska Native alone (NH)	10	22	41	0.21%	0.22%	0.29%
Asian alone (NH)	179	730	1,332	3.67%	7.14%	9.35%
Pacific Islander alone (NH)	2	8	9	0.04%	0.08%	0.06%
Other race alone (NH)	5	9	48	0.10%	0.09%	0.34%
Mixed race or multiracial (NH)	55	190	676	1.13%	1.86%	4.74%
Hispanic or Latino (any race)	223	630	1,202	4.58%	6.17%	8.43%
Total	4,873	10,218	14,253	100.00%	100.00%	100.00%

=== 2020 census ===
As of the 2020 census, there were 14,253 people, 6,120 households, and 3,804 families residing in the city. The population density was 1,453.20 inhabitants per square mile (561.08/km^{2}). There were 6,587 housing units at an average density of 671.59 per square mile (259.30/km^{2}). The racial makeup of the city was 77.38% White, 1.86% African American, 0.49% Native American, 9.40% Asian, 0.07% Pacific Islander, 1.94% from some other races and 8.86% from two or more races. Hispanic or Latino people of any race were 8.43% of the population.

=== 2010 census ===
As of the 2010 census, there were 10,218 people, 4,023 households, and 2,843 families residing in the city. The population density was 1,067.49 inhabitants per square mile (412.16/km^{2}). There were 4,226 housing units at an average density of 441.50 per square mile (170.46/km^{2}). The racial makeup of the city was 87.23% White, 1.62% African American, 0.31% Native American, 7.19% Asian, 0.09% Pacific Islander, 1.31% from some other races and 2.24% from two or more races. Hispanic or Latino people of any race were 6.17% of the population.

=== 2000 census ===
As of the 2000 census, there were 4,873 people, 1,848 households, and 1,367 families residing in the city. The population density was 2,827.24 inhabitants per square mile (1,091.60/km^{2}). There were 1,906 housing units at an average density of 1,105.83 per square mile (426.96/km^{2}). The racial makeup of the city was 91.55% White, 1.48% African American, 0.25% Native American, 3.69% Asian, 0.04% Pacific Islander, 1.31% from some other races and 1.68% from two or more races. Hispanic or Latino people of any race were 4.58% of the population.

There were 1,848 households, out of which 38.7% had children under the age of 18 living with them, 67.0% were married couples living together, 4.9% had a female householder with no husband present, and 26.0% were non-families. 19.5% of all households were made up of individuals, and 1.7% had someone living alone who was 65 years of age or older. The average household size was 2.64 and the average family size was 3.08. In the city, the population was spread out, with 28.3% under the age of 18, 5.4% from 18 to 24, 34.5% from 25 to 44, 28.0% from 45 to 64, and 3.9% who were 65 years of age or older. The median age was 37 years. For every 100 females, there were 98.4 males. For every 100 females age 18 and over, there were 94.7 males.

The median income for a household in the city was $96,308, and the median income for a family was $109,003. Males had a median income of $90,690 versus $43,125 for females. The per capita income for the city was $46,287. About 1.2% of families and 1.4% of the population were below the poverty line, including 1.5% of those under age 18 and 3.7% of those age 65 or over.

== Economy ==
The Charles Schwab Corporation operates a regional corporate campus in the RidgeGate community, consisting of three office buildings totaling 650,000 square feet on a 47-acre site. Opened in 2014, the campus consolidates the majority of Schwab's Colorado operations and is one of the city's largest employers.

Lone Tree is home to Park Meadows, Colorado's largest shopping mall. Opened in August 1996, the mall has approximately 1.6 million square feet of retail space across two levels, with over 185 stores and restaurants. It was designed in a "mountain lodge" style and was expended in 2008 with the opening of an outdoor section. Park Meadows was annexed into the city in 2007, becoming a significant source of municipal sales tax revenue.

=== RidgeGate and the Lone Tree City Center ===
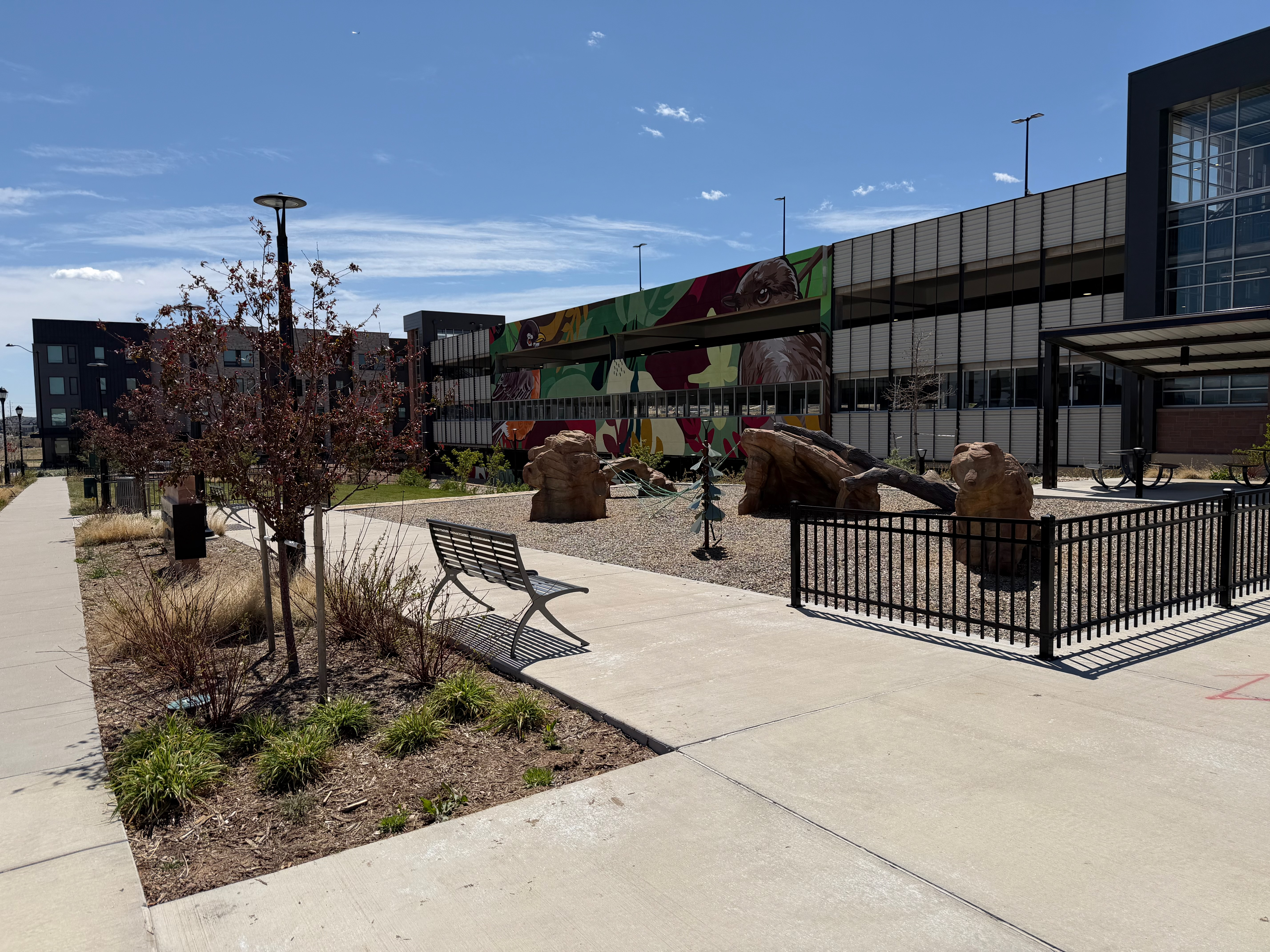
Larry H Levin Park Playground

The largest planned development in Lone Tree is RidgeGate, a 3,500-acre mixed-use community located south of Lincoln Avenue on both sides of Interstate 25. At buildout, the development is projected to support a densely populated urban center generating 30,000 to 40,000 jobs in addition to the approximately 20,000 people already working within city limits. The west side of I-25 within RidgeGate is home to Sky Ridge Medical Center, the regional campus of Charles Schwab, the Kiewit Regional Headquarters, the Lone Tree Arts Center, the Lone Tree Recreation Center, and a branch of Douglas County Libraries. In 2019, the Regional Transportation District extended the E and R light rail lines southward through RidgeGate, opening the Sky Ridge, Lone Tree City Center, and RidgeGate Parkway stations, with RidgeGate Parkway becoming the southernmost station in the RTD light rail system.

The Lone Tree City Center on the east side of I-25 encompasses 2,000 acres (810 ha) and is planned to become a downtown for Lone Tree. It is served by two light rail stations — the Lone Tree City Center station and the RidgeGate Parkway station. The land was annexed by Lone Tree in 2000. Three residential villages are planned to include 8,000 homes, with 350 designated as attainable housing units. The first of these, the Lyric at RidgeGate residential village, is planned for approximately 1,900 homes ranging from condominiums and townhomes to single-family residences.

In May 2025, the city broke ground on a new 38,000-square-foot justice center east of I-25 off RidgeGate Parkway, co-located with a new police station, to accommodate the area's rapid growth; city officials projected Lone Tree's population to roughly double within the following decade. In April 2026, the city broke ground on High Note Park, Lone Tree's first regional park, located in the Lyric neighborhood near I-25 and RidgeGate Parkway. Phase 1 of the park, budgeted at $31 million, is planned to include a playground, lit sports fields, a regional trail, a dog park, a water play feature, and a beer garden.

== Arts and culture ==
The Lone Tree Arts Center (LTAC) is a performing arts venue owned and operated by the city government that opened in September 2011. The facility was funded by a bond approved by residents in 2008 and was built on land donated by the developers of the RidgeGate community. It features a 500-seat main stage theater, a 200-seat event hall, and a 350-seat outdoor terrace theater. LTAC operates a hybrid model, both producing its own professional theatrical productions and presenting national and regional touring artists.

Schweiger Ranch, a 38-acre homestead founded in 1874 by Austrian immigrant brothers John, Joseph, and Jacob Schweiger, is Lone Tree's only designated historic landmark. The ranch operated as a working family farm for nearly a century before falling into disrepair. In 2004 Douglas County granted it historic landmark status, and the Schweiger Ranch Foundation was formed in 2007 to oversee restoration. A $1 million restoration funded by the Colorado State Historical Fund was completed in 2016, earning the foundation the 2017 Stephen H. Hart Award for Historic Preservation from History Colorado. The ranch now operates as a living history museum and event space open to the public.

== Parks and recreation ==
Lone Tree Golf Club & Hotel, managed by South Suburban Parks and Recreation, features an 18-hole Arnold Palmer-designed par-72 championship course along with boutique hotel accommodations. The city maintains an extensive trail network for walking, running, and cycling. Bluffs Regional Park, a 235-acre open space in the southern part of the city, features a 2.7-mile loop trail with panoramic views of the Front Range from Longs Peak to Pikes Peak, and connects to the Douglas County East/West Regional Trail.

== Infrastructure ==
=== Transportation ===
Interstate 25 bisects the city from north to south, and its interchange with State Highway 470 (C-470) in the northern part of the city is one of the major highway junctions in the south Denver metropolitan area. The interchange provides regional access to the Denver metro area and connects to E-470, a toll road that skirts the eastern suburbs and provides a direct route to Denver International Airport.

The Regional Transportation District's E and R lines make five station stops in Lone Tree (County Line, Lincoln, Sky Ridge, Lone Tree City Center, and RidgeGate Parkway). RidgeGate Parkway is the southernmost station in the RTD light rail system.

The city operates Link On Demand, a free on-demand shuttle service bookable via mobile app, providing rides throughout Lone Tree and connecting to neighboring Meridian, Highlands Ranch, and parts of Parker.

=== Healthcare ===
Sky Ridge Medical Center, operated by HCA HealthONE, is an acute care hospital and Level II Trauma Center located at 10101 RidgeGate Parkway. Opened in 2003 as Douglas County's first hospital, it underwent a $107 million expansion between 2013 and 2014 that added 90 beds, four operating rooms, and an expanded women's health and neonatal intensive care center.

== Notable people ==
- Gitanjali Rao, scientist and Time magazine's first Kid of the Year in 2020.

== See also ==
- Front Range Urban Corridor
- Denver-Aurora-Boulder, CO Combined Statistical Area
- Denver-Aurora-Broomfield, CO Metropolitan Statistical Area
