= Lincoln station (RTD) =

Light rail station in Lone Tree, Colorado

Lincoln
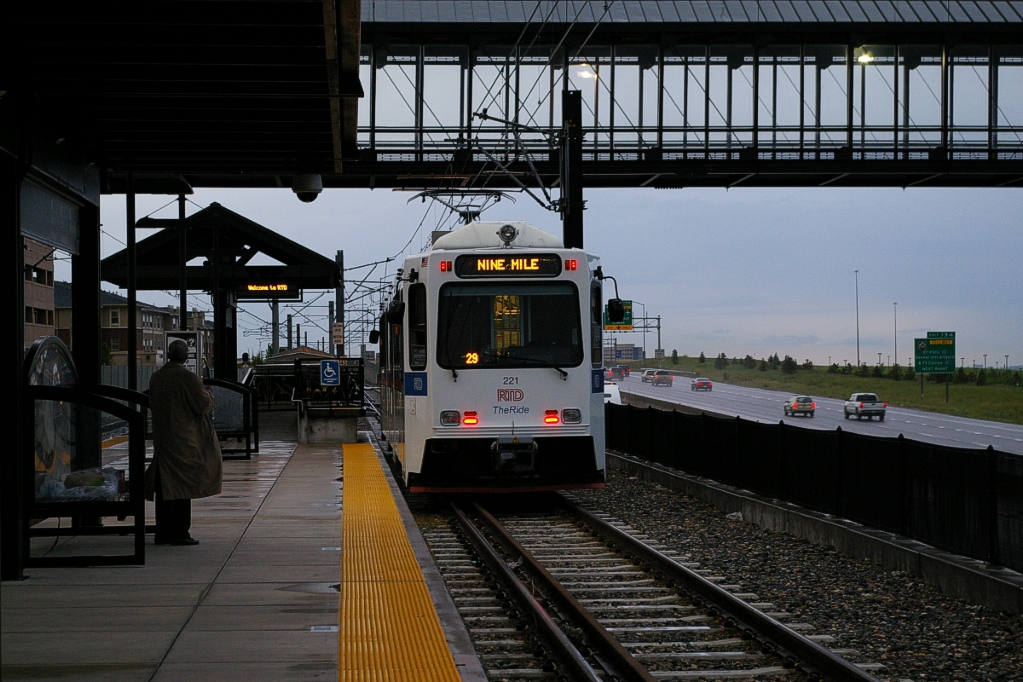
- Lincoln station platform with northbound train in June 2007

General information
- Location: 10185 Park Meadows Drive; Lone Tree, Colorado
- Coordinates: 39.545317°N 104.8698°W
- Owner: Regional Transportation District
- Line: Southeast Corridor
- Platforms: 1 island platform, 1 side platform
- Tracks: 2
- Connections: RTD Bus: 483, Lone Tree FlexRide, Meridian FlexRide

Construction
- Structure type: At-grade
- Parking: 1,734 spaces
- Cycle facilities: 8 racks, 16 lockers
- Accessible: Yes

History
- Opened: November 17, 2006

Passengers
- 2025: 1,327 (average daily)
- Rank: 29 out of 75

Services
Preceding station	RTD	Following station
County Line toward Union Station	E Line	Sky Ridge toward RidgeGate Parkway
County Line toward Peoria	R Line	Sky Ridge toward RidgeGate Parkway
County Line toward Alameda	T Line	Terminus
Former services
Preceding station	RTD	Following station
County Line toward 18th & California	F Line	Sky Ridge toward RidgeGate Parkway
County Line toward Nine Mile	G Line (2006–2009)	Terminus
Location

Lincoln station is a light rail station in Lone Tree, Colorado. It is operated by the Regional Transportation District (RTD), and was opened on November 17, 2006. The station is currently served by the E, R, and T Lines, and is the southern terminus of the T Line.

== Station layout ==
2F
Pedestrian bridge
1F

Platform Level

San Luis Street; Jamaica Street
I-25
Northbound
← toward Union Station (County Line)
← toward Peoria (County Line)
← toward Alameda (County Line)
Island platform, northbound only; doors will open on the left
Southbound
toward RidgeGate Parkway (Sky Ridge) →
Side platform, southbound only; doors will open on the right
Park Meadows Drive; bus bays; parking

Southbound T Line trains terminate on the northbound track, from which they proceed back to Alameda. A pedestrian bridge over Interstate 25 provides access to office buildings on the east side of the freeway. The station features a public art installation entitled Sun Stream, created by Ray King and dedicated in 2006.

== History ==
The station was the southern terminus of the E Line from its opening until the completion of the FasTracks Southeast Light Rail Extension project, and is the regular southern terminus of the R Line. R Line service briefly continued to RidgeGate Parkway following the completion of the Southeast Light Rail Extension Project, but was cut back to Lincoln in 2020 due to the COVID-19 pandemic. This service pattern has persisted since the pandemic due to low demand south of Lincoln, as the area is still largely undeveloped.

As of September 2026, R Line service to RidgeGate Parkway has been temporarily restored as a part of service changes accommodating the Downtown Rail Reconstruction Project. R Line service will be truncated back to Lincoln when the project is complete.
