= Colfax at Auraria station =

Light rail station in Denver, Colorado

Colfax at Auraria
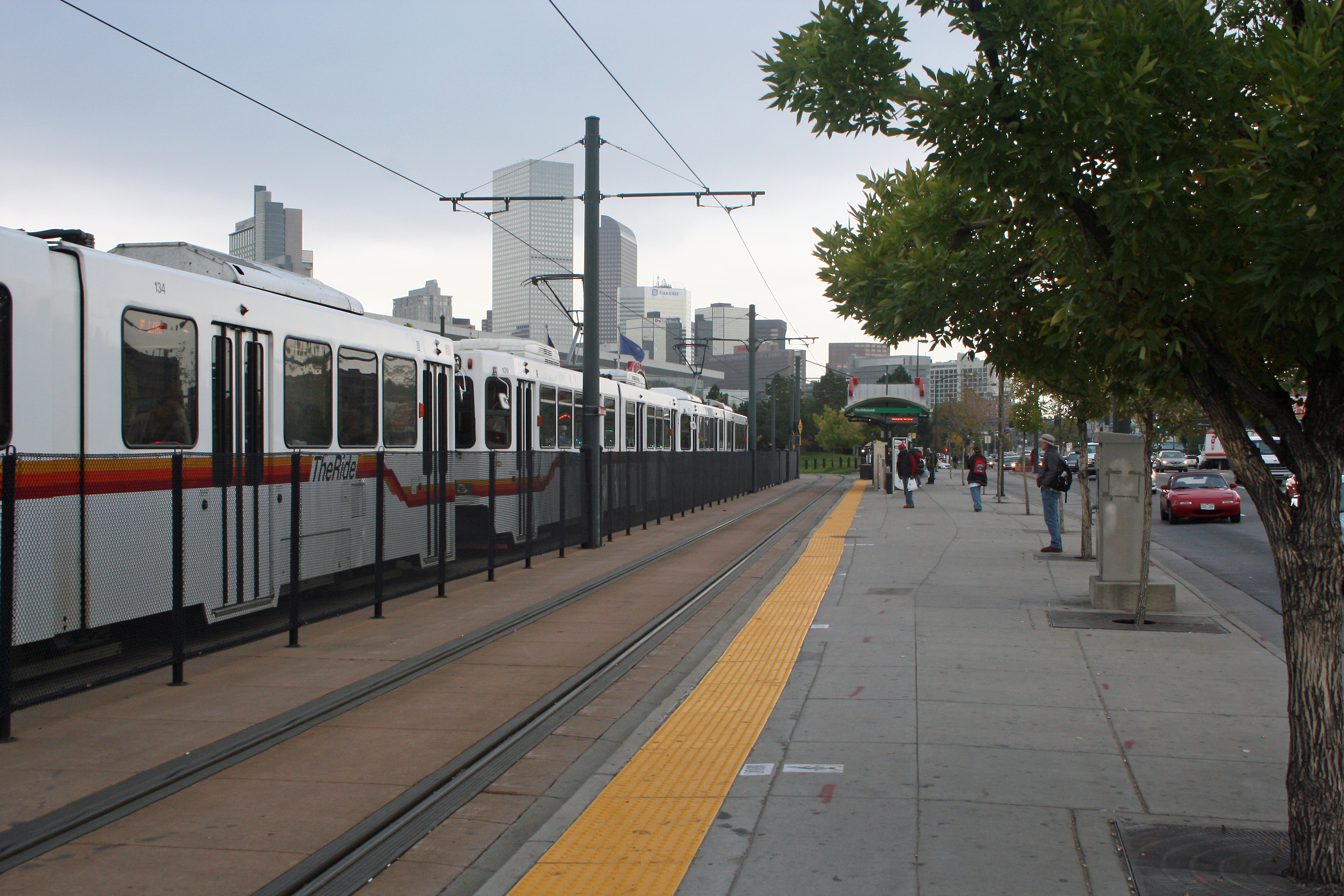
- Colfax at Auraria light rail station in Denver, the street on the right is West Colfax Avenue

General information
- Location: 1101 West Colfax Avenue; Denver, Colorado
- Coordinates: 39.740319°N 105.001918°W
- Line: Central Corridor
- Platforms: 2 side platforms
- Tracks: 2
- Connections: RTD Bus: 16

Construction
- Structure type: At-grade
- Accessible: Yes

History
- Opened: October 8, 1994

Passengers
- 2025: 1.803 (average daily)
- Rank: 13 out of 75

Services
Preceding station	RTD	Following station
Theatre District–Convention Center toward 18th & California/Stout	H Line	10th & Osage toward Florida
Former services
Preceding station	RTD	Following station
Theatre District–Convention Center toward 18th & California/Stout	D Line	10th & Osage toward Littleton–Mineral
Theatre District–Convention Center toward 18th & California	F Line	10th & Osage toward RidgeGate Parkway
Future services
Preceding station	RTD	Following station
Theatre District–Convention Center toward 30th & Downing	L Line	10th & Osage toward I-25 & Broadway
Location

Colfax at Auraria station is a light rail station in Denver, Colorado, United States. It is served by the H Line, operated by the Regional Transportation District (RTD), and was opened on October 8, 1994. It serves the eastern side of the Auraria academic campus, home to Metropolitan State College of Denver, the Community College of Denver, and the University of Colorado Denver.

== Station layout ==
1F

Platform Level

US 40 / West Colfax Avenue
Side platform, doors will open on the right
Northbound
← toward 18th & California (Theatre District-Convention Center)
Southbound
toward Florida (10th & Osage) →
Side platform, doors will open on the right
Auraria Campus

The station is a half mile east of Auraria West station, which also serves the Auraria campus. In 2008, the station was remodeled to enable the platforms to accommodate four-car trains. Colfax at Auraria station is accessible via the Auraria Campus to the north and West Colfax Avenue from the south.

The station was served by the D Line until June 2026, when service on that line was discontinued. The L Line is planned to serve this station following the conclusion of the Downtown Rail Reconstruction Project in 2027.
