= Theatre District–Convention Center station =

Light rail station in Denver, Colorado

Theater District–Convention Center
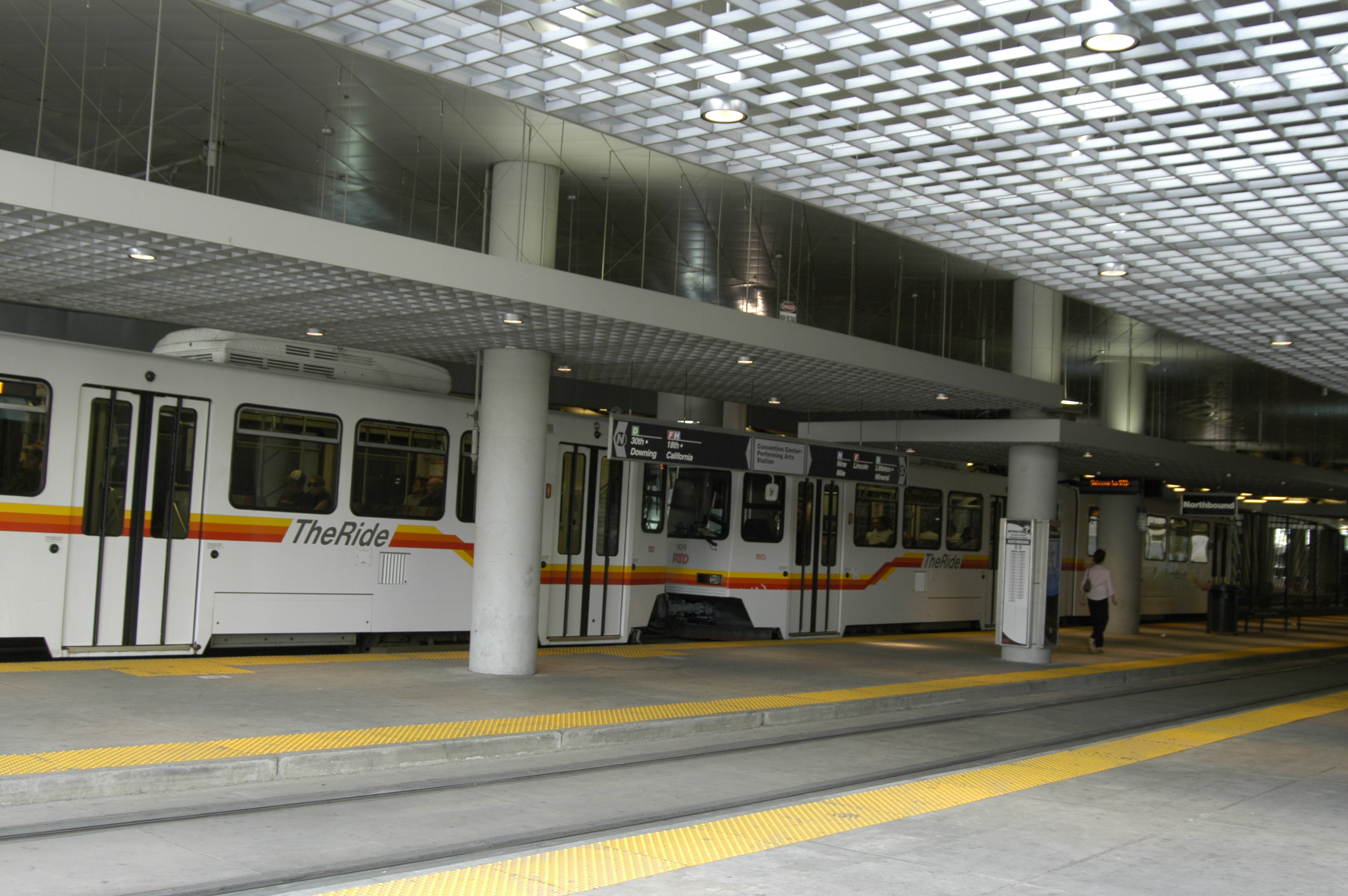
- Theater District-Convention Center station platforms, located under the Colorado Convention Center

General information
- Location: 1325 Stout Street; Denver, Colorado
- Coordinates: 39.743727°N 104.996341°W
- Line: Central Corridor
- Platforms: 2 side platforms, 1 island platform
- Tracks: 2
- Connections: RTD Buses

Construction
- Structure type: At-grade
- Accessible: Yes

History
- Opened: November 28, 2004
- Former names: Convention Center-Performing Arts

Passengers
- 2025: 1,410 (average daily)
- Rank: 25 out of 75

Services
| Preceding station | RTD | Following station |
|---|---|---|
| 16th & California/Stout toward 18th & California/Stout | H Line | Colfax at Auraria toward Florida |
Former services
| Preceding station | RTD | Following station |
|---|---|---|
| 16th & California/Stout toward 18th & California/Stout | D Line | Colfax at Auraria toward Littleton–Mineral |
| 16th & California/Stout toward 18th & California | F Line | Colfax at Auraria toward RidgeGate Parkway |
Future services
| Preceding station | RTD | Following station |
|---|---|---|
| 16th & California/Stout toward 30th & Downing | L Line | Colfax at Auraria toward I-25 & Broadway |
Location

Theatre District–Convention Center station is a light rail station in Denver, Colorado, United States. It is served by the H Line, operated by the Regional Transportation District (RTD), and was opened on November 28, 2004. It is located on Stout Street, between Speer Boulevard and 14th Street, located under the Colorado Convention Center and also close to the Denver Performing Arts Complex.

The station opened in 2004 to replace the 14th & Stout station and 14th & California station, which were used for southbound and northbound trips respectively. These original stations were opened with the rest of the Central Corridor in 1994.

== Station layout ==
1F

Platform Level

14th Street; Stout Street
Side platform, doors will open on both sides
Northbound
← toward 18th & California (16th & California)
Island platform, doors will open on both sides
Southbound
toward Florida (Colfax at Auraria) →
Side platform, doors will open on both sides
Colorado Convention Center

Theatre District–Convention Center station is accessible via the Colorado Convention Center, 14th Street, and Stout Street. While at-grade, it is completely covered by the convention center.

Theatre District/Convention Center was one of the first stations on Denver's light rail system with a 4-car platform. As part of the FasTracks plan that was approved by voters in 2004, most light rail stations in Denver have been upgraded to 4-car platforms. From 2004 to 2009, the station was known as Convention Center-Performing Arts station.

The D Line served this station from its opening until it was discontinued in June 2026. The L Line is planned to serve this station following the conclusion of the Downtown Rail Reconstruction Project.

== Gallery ==
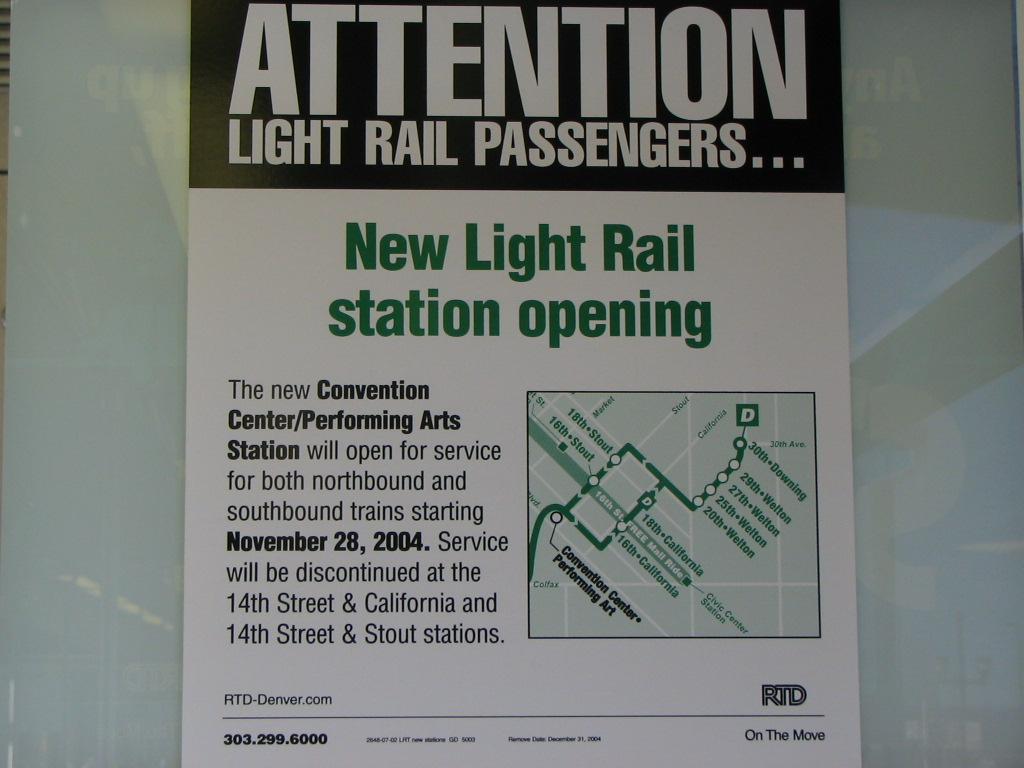
This is the sign that was displayed on the RTD light rail vehicles before the station was opened.

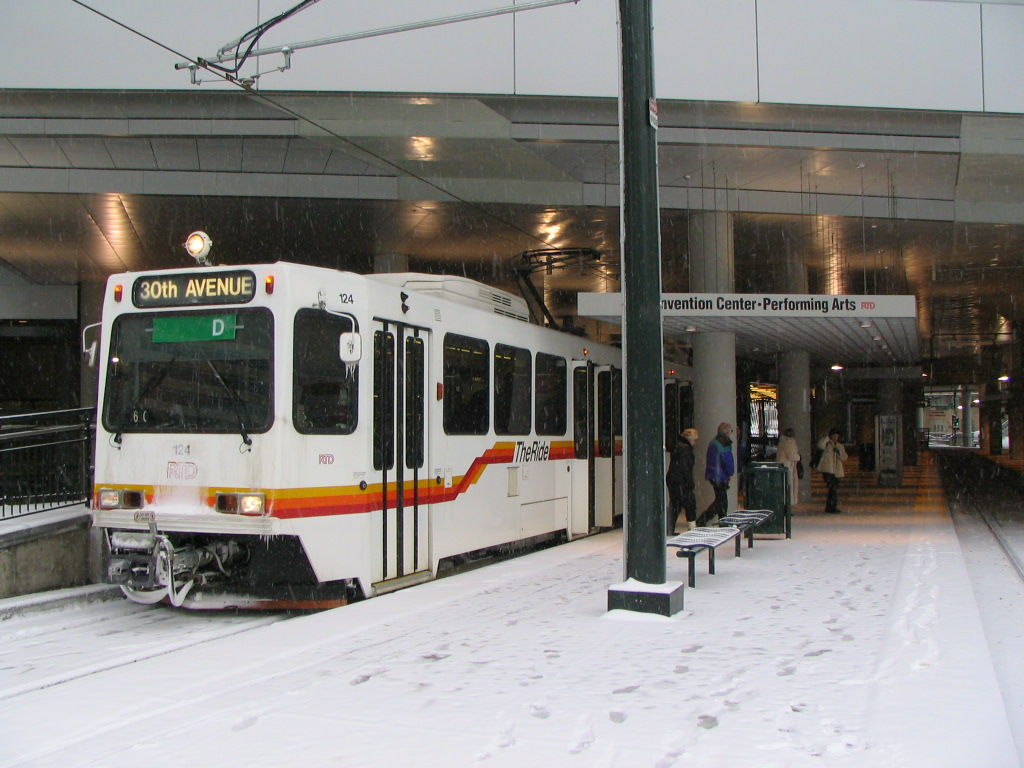
A northbound D-Line train to 30th & Downing at the Convention Center station on its first day of operation.
