= 10th & Osage station =

Light rail station in Denver, Colorado

10th•Osage
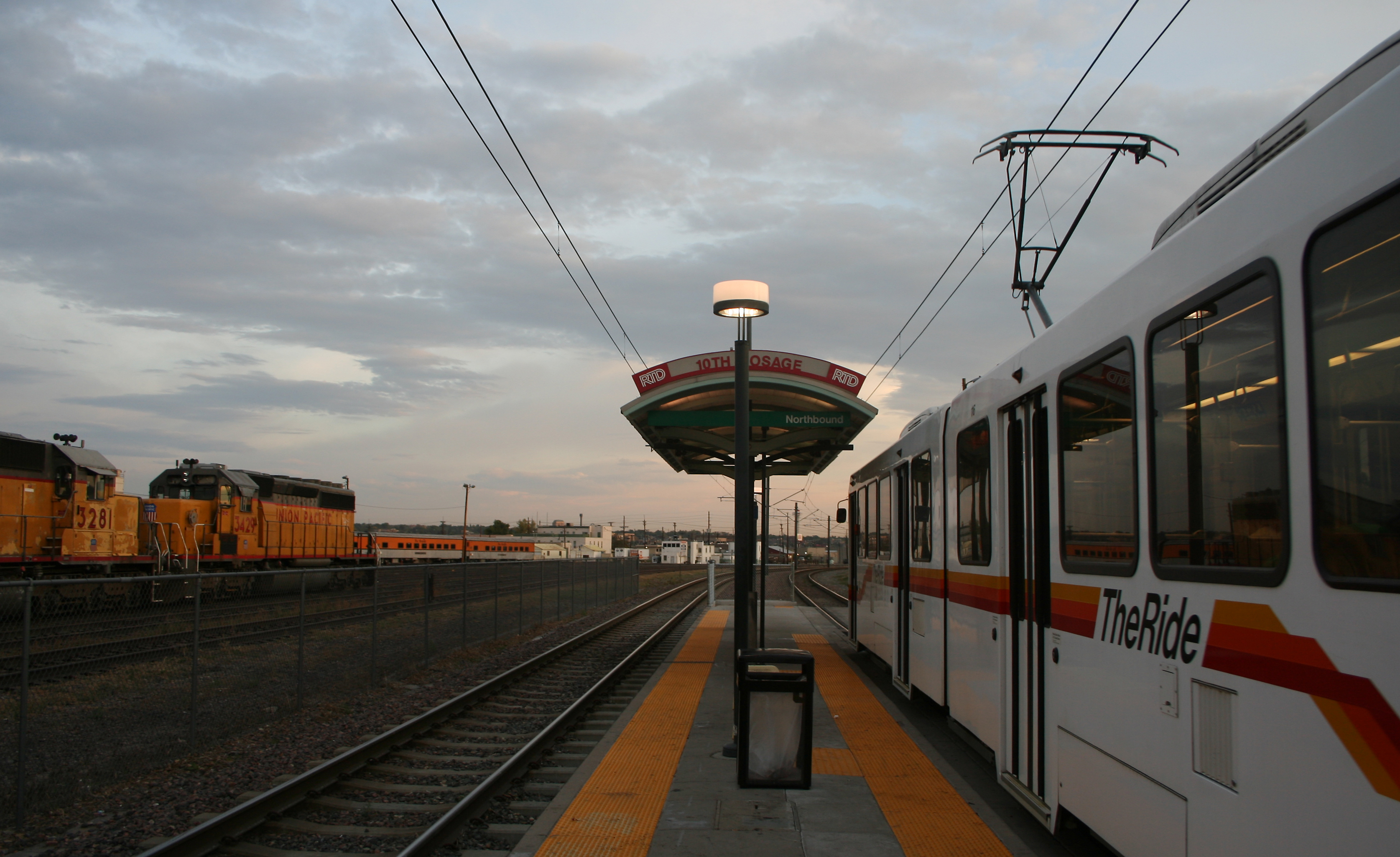
- 10th & Osage station

General information
- Other names: 10th•Osage
- Location: 975 Osage Street; Denver, Colorado
- Coordinates: 39.731924°N 105.005605°W
- Owner: Regional Transportation District
- Line: Central Corridor
- Platforms: 1 island platform, 1 side platform
- Tracks: 2

Construction
- Structure type: At-grade
- Accessible: Yes

History
- Opened: October 8, 1994

Passengers
- 2025: 2,146 (average daily)
- Rank: 11 out of 75

Services
Preceding station	RTD	Following station
Auraria West toward Union Station	C Line	Alameda toward Littleton–Mineral
Auraria West toward Union Station	E Line	Alameda toward RidgeGate Parkway
Former services
Preceding station	RTD	Following station
Colfax at Auraria toward 18th & California/Stout	D Line	Alameda toward Littleton–Mineral
Colfax at Auraria toward 18th & California	F Line	Alameda toward RidgeGate Parkway
Future services
Preceding station	RTD	Following station
Colfax at Auraria toward 18th & California/Stout	H Line Suspended	Alameda toward Florida
Colfax at Auraria toward 30th & Downing	L Line Suspended	Alameda toward I-25 & Broadway
Location

10th & Osage station (sometimes stylized as 10th•Osage) is an RTD light rail station in Denver, Colorado, United States. It opened on October 8, 1994, and is operated by the Regional Transportation District. The station is currently served by the C and E Lines.

The station is typically served by the H Line, which is suspended as of September 2026 due to the Downtown Rail Reconstruction Project. The L Line, which is also suspended due to the project, is planned to be extended through the station to I-25 & Broadway. When the H and L Lines resume service, 10th & Osage will be the last station shared by all lines northbound from I-25 & Broadway, and will be the last transfer point for passengers travelling north to Union Station on the C and E Lines, and to 16th Street and the downtown loop on the H and L Lines.

== Station layout ==
1F

Platform Level

West 10th Avenue; South Osage Street
Side platform, northbound only; doors will open on the right
Northbound
← toward Union Station (Auraria West)
Island platform, southbound only; doors will open on the left
Southbound
toward Littleton-Mineral (Alameda) →
toward RidgeGate Parkway (Alameda)

10th & Osage Station is located in the La Alma-Lincoln Park neighborhood. Immediately across the Osage Street from the station is the Buckhorn Exchange, a Denver landmark and the city's oldest restaurant. Visible to the west of the station, but fenced off from foot traffic, is the Burnham Yard of the Union Pacific Railroad, which was once the railroad's second largest locomotive facility. There are no bus connections from this station.

The station is planned to be relocated south of 10th Avenue and substantially expanded as a part of the construction of New Broncos Stadium. The stadium will be developed over Burnham Yard and will be located immediately west of the new station. It will be accompanied by transit-oriented development. The project is expected to be completed alongside the stadium's opening in 2031.
