= 16th & California and 16th & Stout stations =

Light rail stations in Denver, Colorado

16th•California 16th•Stout
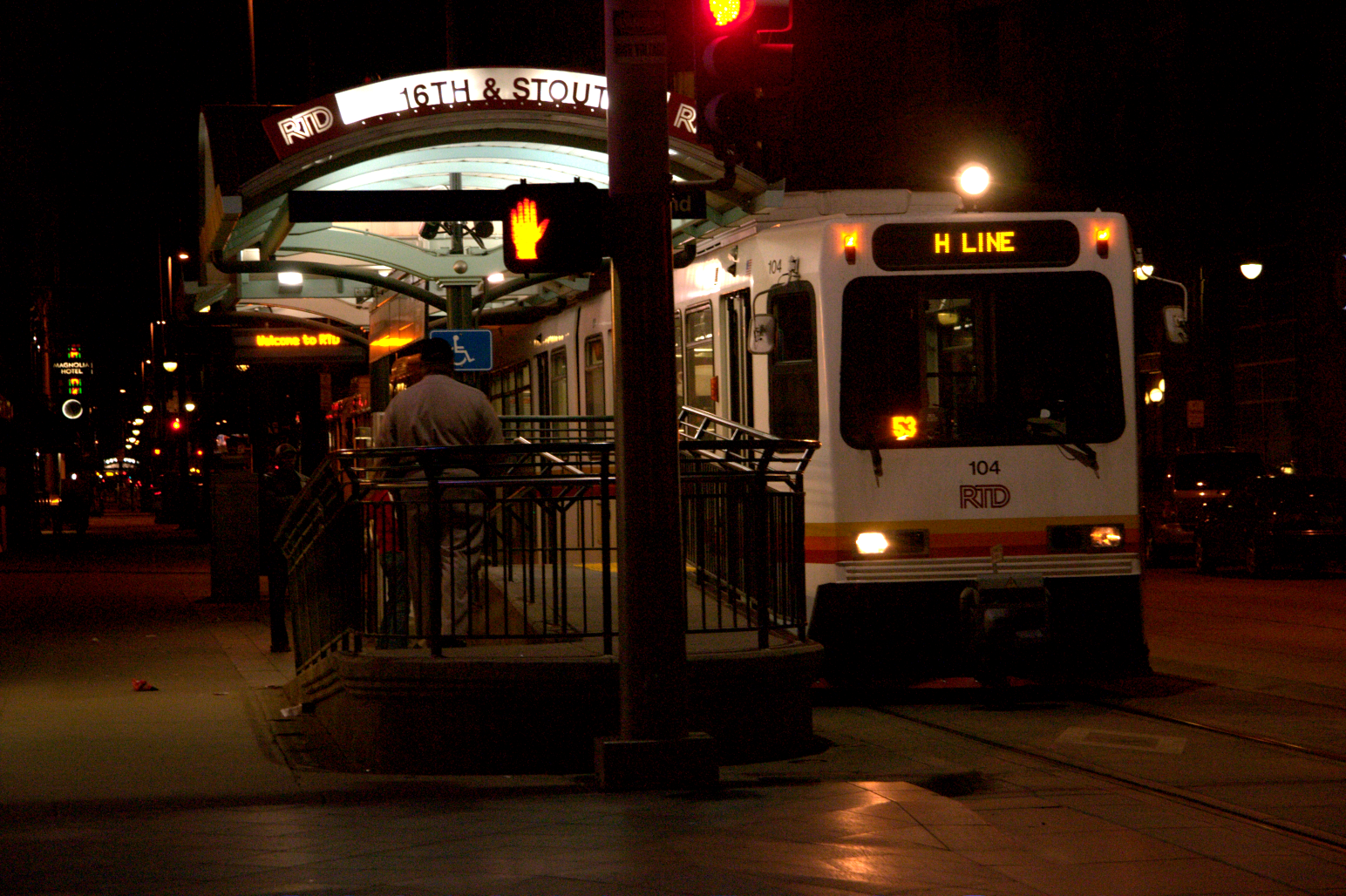
- 16th & Stout station platform

General information
- Location: 1516 California Street; 1617 Stout Street; Denver, Colorado
- Coordinates: 39.745511°N 104.992572°W
- Line: Central Corridor
- Platforms: 2 split side platforms
- Tracks: 2
- Connections: RTD Bus: 16th Street FreeRide

Construction
- Structure type: At-grade
- Accessible: Yes

History
- Opened: October 8, 1994

Passengers
- 2025: 2,362 (average daily)
- Rank: 8 out of 75 (combined)

Services
Preceding station	RTD	Following station
18th & California/Stout Terminus	H Line Suspended	Theatre District–Convention Center toward Florida
18th & California/Stout toward 30th & Downing	L Line Suspended	Theatre District–Convention Center toward I-25 & Broadway
Former services
Preceding station	RTD	Following station
18th & California/Stout Terminus	D Line	Theatre District–Convention Center toward Littleton–Mineral
18th & California/Stout toward 18th & California	F Line	Theatre District–Convention Center toward RidgeGate Parkway
Location

16th & California and 16th & Stout stations (sometimes styled as 16th•California and 16th•Stout) are a pair of light rail stations in Downtown Denver, Colorado, United States. They are served by the H and L lines, operated by the Regional Transportation District (RTD), and were opened on October 8, 1994. The stations have one track each and are one city block apart. 16th & California is served only by northbound trains and 16th & Stout is served only by southbound trains. These stations serve 16th Street and provide connections to the 16th Street FreeRide.

16th & Stout is the current southbound terminus of the L Line. Passengers must transfer to H Line trains at this station to continue south out of downtown Denver. The L Line is planned to be extended to I-25 & Broadway in 2027; this extension will eliminate the transfer at 16th & Stout.

== Station layout ==
=== 16th & Stout ===
1F

Platform Level

16th Street; 16th Street FreeRide toward Union Station or Civic Center
Side platform, doors will open on the right
Southbound
← toward Florida (Theatre District-Convention Center)
← terminates (loop track to 16th & California)
Stout Street (one way) →

=== 16th & California ===
1F

Platform Level

← California Street (one way)
Northbound
toward 18th & California (Terminus) →
toward 30th & Downing (18th & California) →
Side platform, doors will open on the right
16th Street; 16th Street FreeRide toward Civic Center or Union Station

== Gallery ==
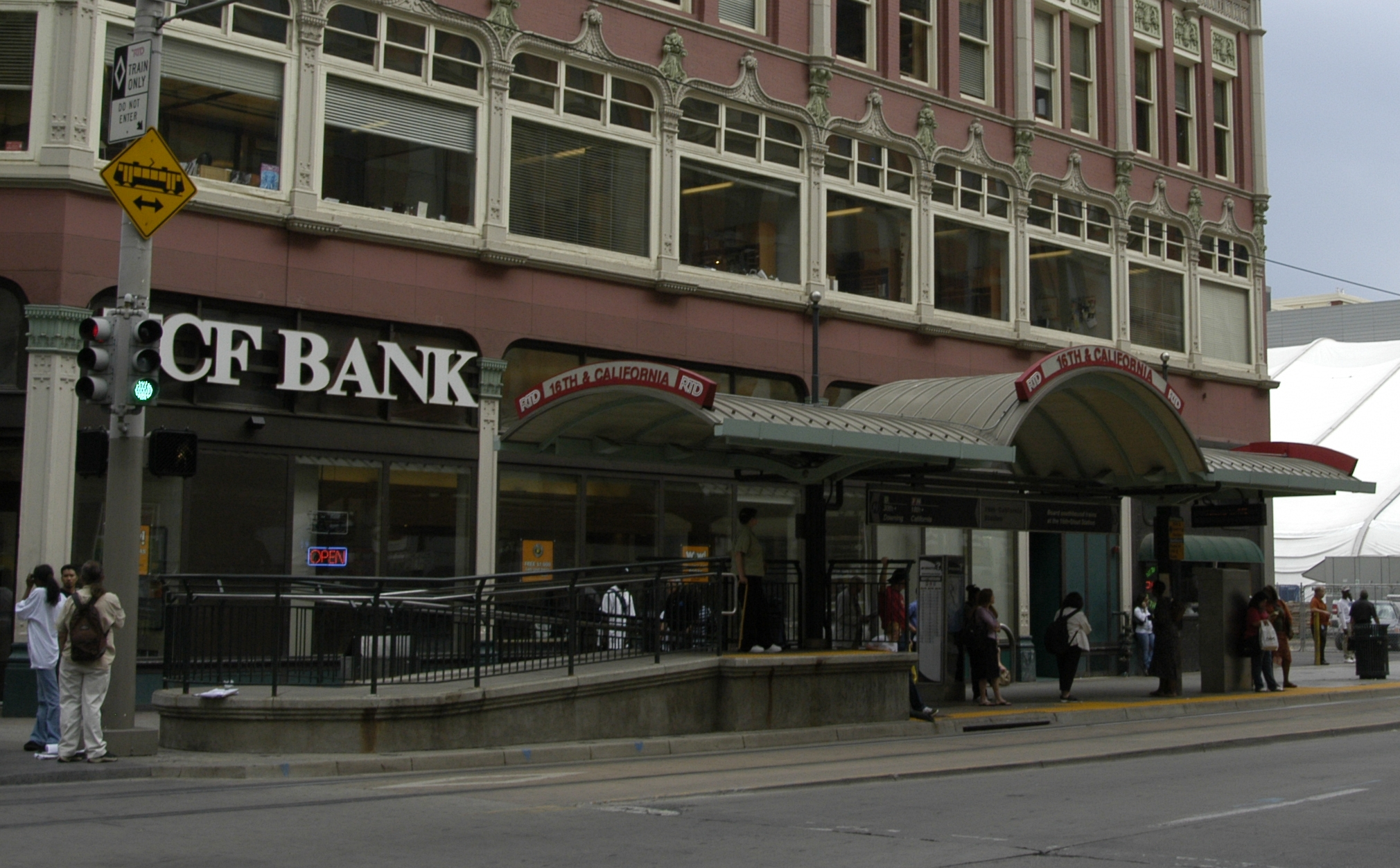
16th & California station

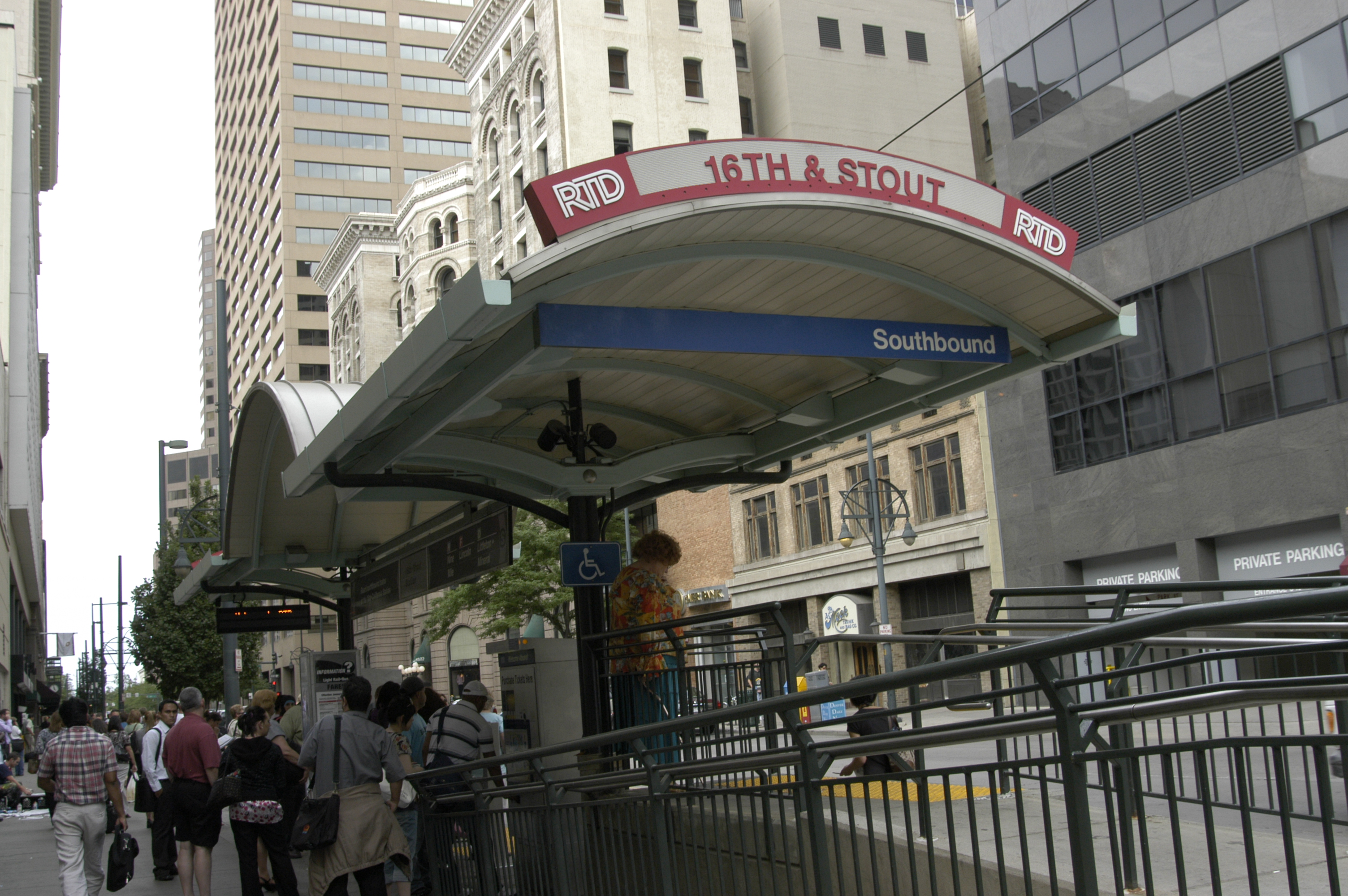
16th & Stout station
