= Alameda station (RTD) =

Light rail station in Denver, Colorado

Alameda
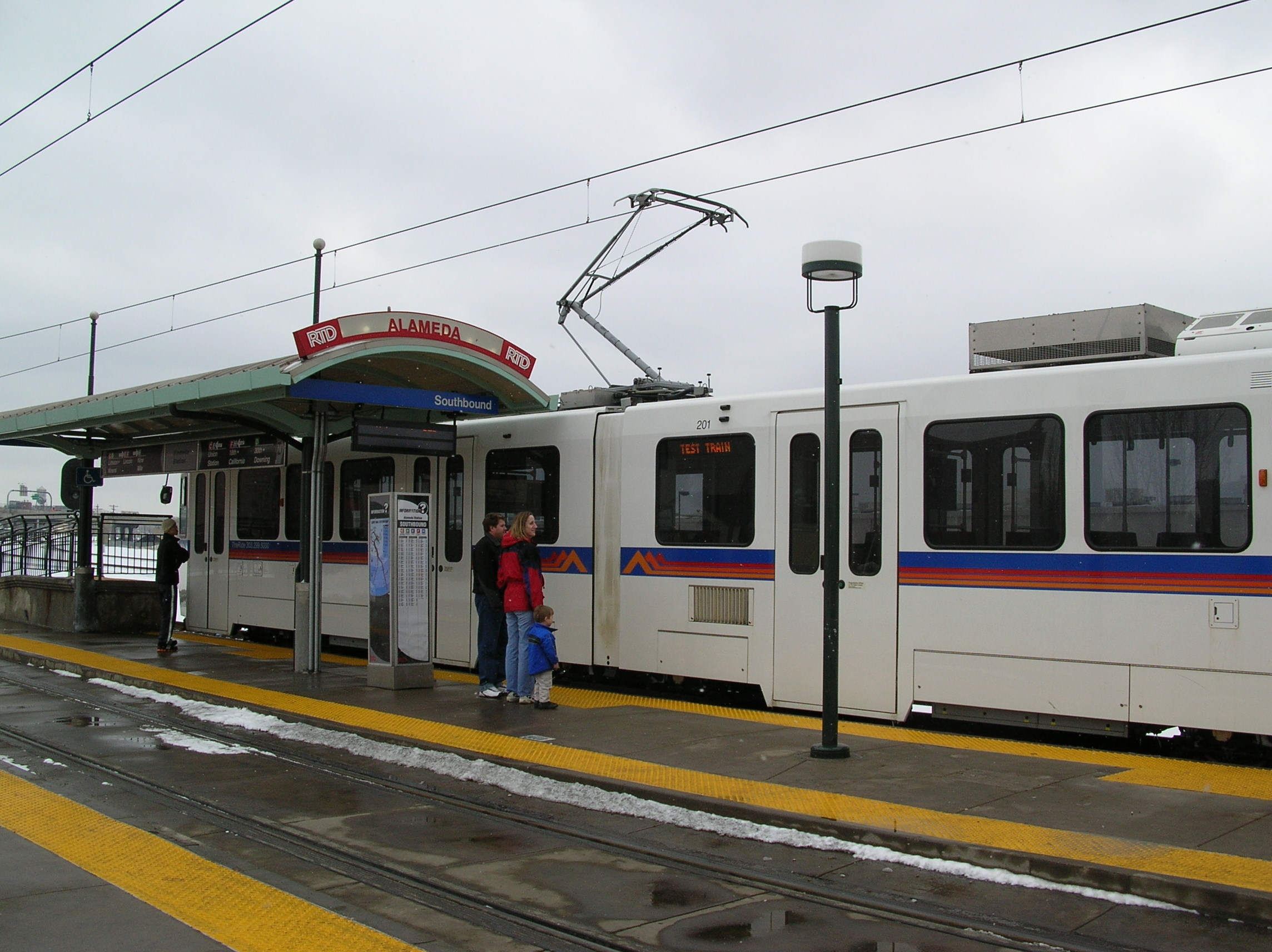
- Trains arriving at the Alameda station

General information
- Location: 425 South Cherokee Street; Denver, Colorado
- Coordinates: 39.708511°N 104.993028°W
- Owner: Regional Transportation District
- Line: Central Corridor
- Platforms: 1 island platform, 1 side platform
- Tracks: 2
- Connections: RTD Bus: 3, 4, 52, ART, Platte Valley FlexRide

Construction
- Structure type: At-grade
- Cycle facilities: 8 racks, 12 lockers
- Accessible: Yes

History
- Opened: October 8, 1994

Passengers
- 2025: 2,247 (average daily)
- Rank: 9 out of 75

Services
Preceding station	RTD	Following station
10th & Osage toward Union Station	C Line	I-25 & Broadway toward Littleton–Mineral
10th & Osage toward Union Station	E Line	I-25 & Broadway toward RidgeGate Parkway
Terminus	T Line	I-25 & Broadway toward Lincoln
Former services
Preceding station	RTD	Following station
10th & Osage toward 18th & California/Stout	D Line	I-25 & Broadway toward Littleton–Mineral
10th & Osage toward 18th & California	F Line	I-25 & Broadway toward RidgeGate Parkway
Future services
Preceding station	RTD	Following station
10th & Osage toward 18th & California/Stout	H Line Suspended	I-25 & Broadway toward Florida
10th & Osage toward 30th & Downing	L Line Suspended	I-25 & Broadway Terminus
Location

Alameda station is an RTD light rail station in Denver, Colorado. The station opened on October 8, 1994, and is operated by the Regional Transportation District. It is currently served by the C, E, and T Lines, and is the northern terminus of the T Line.

The station is typically served by the H Line, which is suspended as of September 2026 due to the Downtown Rail Reconstruction Project. The L Line, which is also suspended due to the project, is planned to be extended through the station to I-25 & Broadway. When the project is completed in 2027, the H and L Lines will be restored and the T Line will be eliminated.

== Station layout ==
1F

Platform Level

South Cherokee Street; bus bays
Side platform, northbound only; doors will open on the right
Northbound
← toward Union Station (10th & Osage)
Island platform, southbound only; doors will open on the left
Southbound
toward Littleton-Mineral (I-25 & Broadway) →
toward RidgeGate Parkway (I-25 & Broadway) →
toward Lincoln (I-25 & Broadway) →

Alameda station is located in the Baker neighborhood of Denver. In recent years, the station has been the site of transit-oriented development. As of 2026, six large apartment complexes have been constructed along South Cherokee Street near the station. To this end, the station's parking lot has been removed and re-developed. The station is located three blocks west of South Broadway.
