= F Line (RTD) =

Former light rail line in the Denver metropolitan area

- F
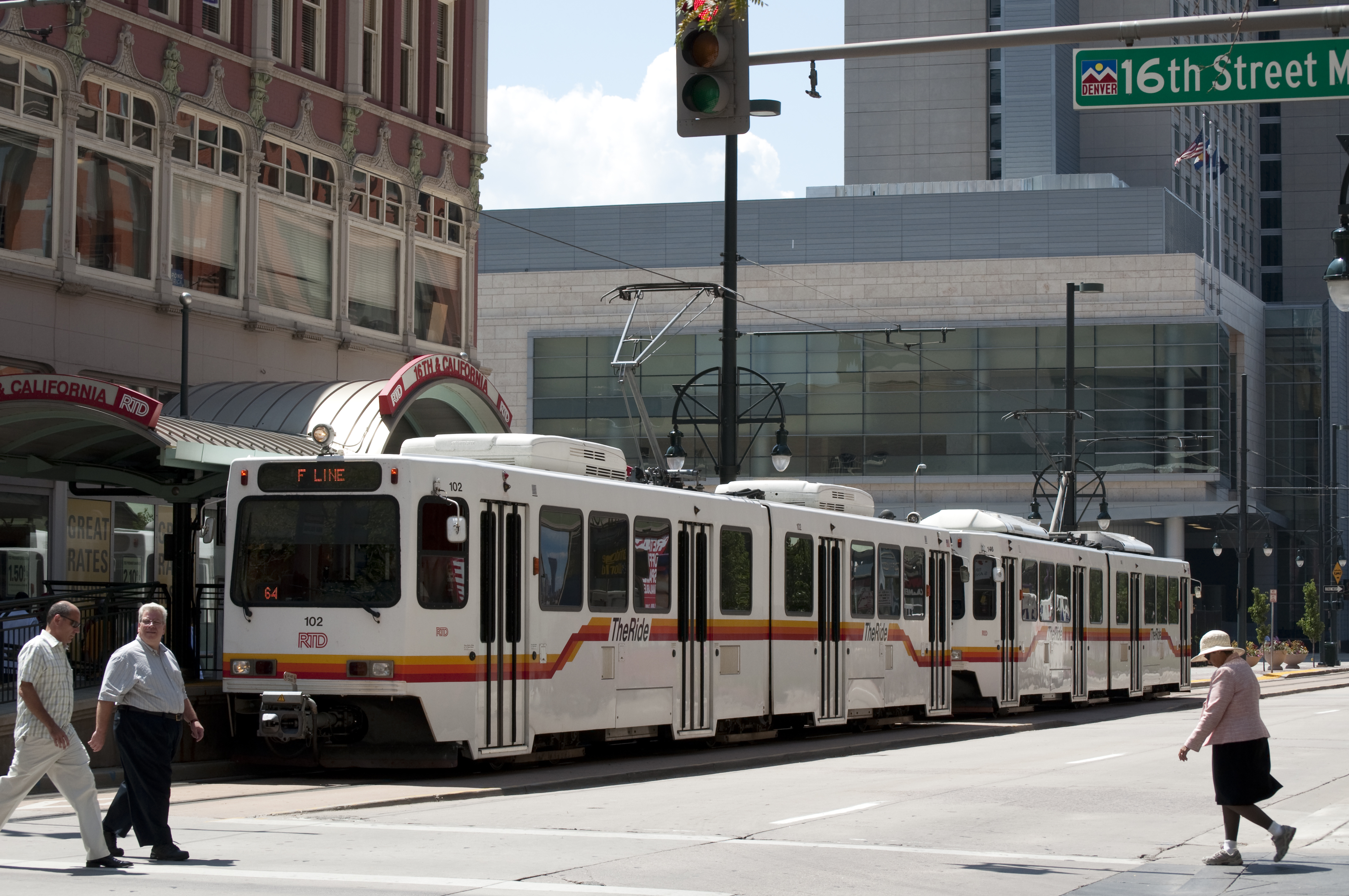
- F Line at 16th & California station

Overview
- Status: Discontinued
- Owner: Regional Transportation District
- Locale: Denver metropolitan area
- Termini: 18th & California/18th & Stout; RidgeGate Parkway
- Stations: 21

Service
- Type: Light rail
- System: RTD Rail
- Operator: Regional Transportation District

History
- Opened: November 17, 2006
- Closed: September 20, 2020

Technical
- Track gauge: 4 ft 8 1/2 in (1,435 mm) standard gauge
- Electrification: Overhead line, 750 V DC
Route map
F Line highlighted in red

The F Line was a light rail line operated by the Regional Transportation District in the Denver-Aurora Metropolitan Area in Colorado. It operated from 2006 until 2020, when it was suspended due to the COVID-19 pandemic.

== Route ==
The F Line began in the downtown loop and proceeded south from downtown Denver, along with the D and H Lines. It joined the C and E Lines near the Auraria campus, and the five lines travelled south to I-25 & Broadway. The F Line diverged along with the E and H Lines onto a flyover, and then ran parallel to Interstate 25 for the rest of its route. The line's final southern terminus was at RidgeGate Parkway in Lone Tree, shared with the E and R Lines.

== History ==
RTD suspended the F Line due to the COVID-19 pandemic in its September 2020 service change. The line never returned to service and was officially eliminated in RTD's January 2023 service change.

All stations along the F Line were shared with at least two other RTD rail lines. Its elimination helped to de-interline the network. The line's former route is now served by the E and H Lines, with a transfer at I-25 & Broadway.

== Stations ==
The table below shows the F Line's final service pattern and connections in 2020.

Station	Municipality	Opened	Major connections & notes
18th & California (northbound); 18th & Stout (southbound)	Denver	October 8, 1994	Flatiron Flyer
16th & California (northbound); 16th & Stout (southbound)	Denver	October 8, 1994	MallRide
14th & California (northbound); 14th & Stout (southbound)	Denver	October 8, 1994	Closed November 27, 2004
Theatre District–Convention Center	Denver	November 28, 2004	Regional Transportation District D Line (RTD) H Line (RTD)
Colfax at Auraria	Denver	October 8, 1994	Regional Transportation District D Line (RTD) H Line (RTD)
10th & Osage	Denver	October 8, 1994	Regional Transportation District C Line (RTD) D Line (RTD) E Line (RTD) H Line (RTD)
Alameda	Denver	October 8, 1994	Park and ride: 240 spaces
I-25 & Broadway	Denver	October 8, 1994	Park and ride: 1,248 spaces
Louisiana–Pearl	Denver	November 17, 2006	Regional Transportation District E Line (RTD) H Line (RTD)
University of Denver	Denver	November 17, 2006	Park and ride: 540 spaces
Colorado	Denver	November 17, 2006	Park and ride: 363 spaces
Yale	Denver	November 17, 2006	Park and ride: 129 spaces
Southmoor	Denver	November 17, 2006	Park and ride: 788 spaces
Belleview	Denver	November 17, 2006	Park and ride: 817 spaces
Orchard	Greenwood Village	November 17, 2006	Park and ride: 48 spaces
Arapahoe at Village Center	Greenwood Village	November 17, 2006	Park and ride: 817 spaces
Dry Creek	Centennial	November 17, 2006	Park and ride: 235 spaces
County Line	Lone Tree	November 17, 2006	Park and ride: 388 spaces
Lincoln	Lone Tree	November 17, 2006	Park and ride: 1,734 spaces
Sky Ridge	Lone Tree	May 17, 2019	Regional Transportation District E Line (RTD) R Line (RTD)
Lone Tree City Center	Lone Tree	May 17, 2019	Regional Transportation District E Line (RTD) R Line (RTD)
RidgeGate Parkway	Lone Tree	May 17, 2019	Park and ride: 1,300 spaces

== FasTracks ==
The 2004 voter-approved FasTracks initiative included the Southeast Corridor extension for the E and F Line, which extended the lines by 2.3 mi (3.70 km) to southern Lone Tree. The extension cost $223 million to construct and was opened on May 17, 2019. It included three new stations, Sky Ridge, Lone Tree City Center, and RidgeGate Parkway, the latter with a 2,000-stall parking facility. The F Line only served these stations for around a year before it was suspended from service, and eventually eliminated.
