= D Line (RTD) =

Former light rail line in the Denver metropolitan area

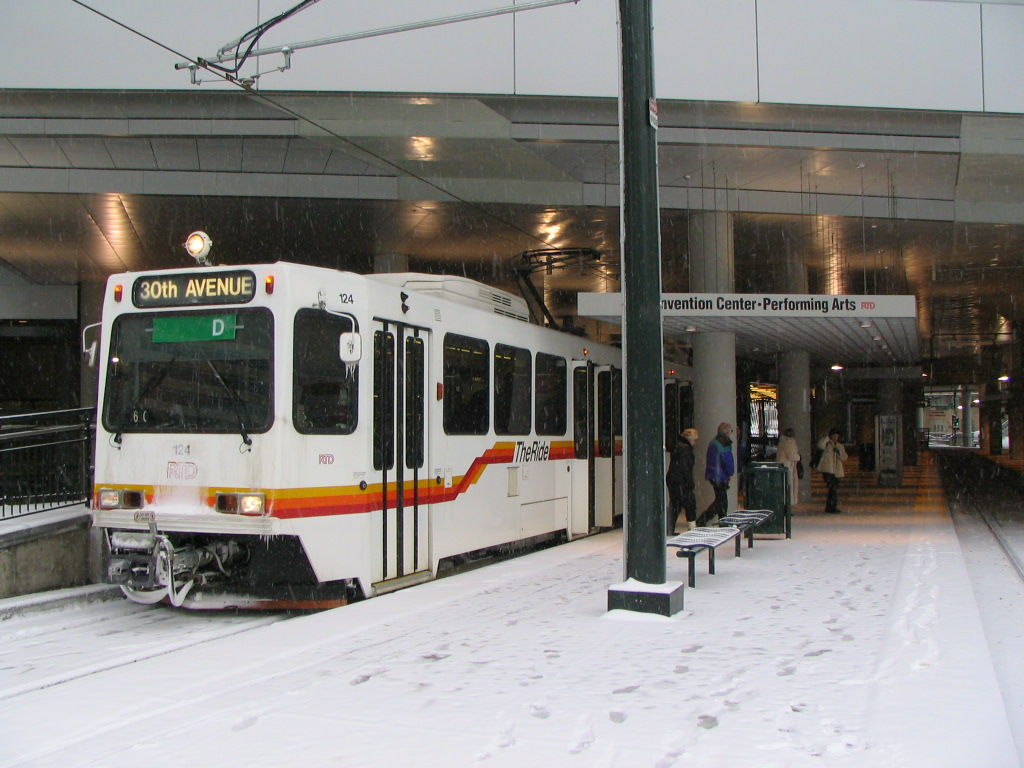
- D Line at Convention Center station

Overview
- Status: Discontinued
- Owner: Regional Transportation District
- Locale: Denver metropolitan area
- Termini: 18th & California/18th & Stout; Littleton–Mineral
- Stations: 12

Service
- Type: Light rail
- System: RTD Rail
- Operator: Regional Transportation District
- Ridership: 2,666,000 (FY2023, annual)

History
- Opened: October 7, 1994
- Closed: June 7, 2026

Technical
- Track gauge: 4 ft 8 1/2 in (1,435 mm) standard gauge
- Electrification: Overhead line, 750 V DC
Route map
D Line highlighted in green

The D Line was a light rail line operated by the Regional Transportation District in the Denver–Aurora Metropolitan Area in Colorado. It operated from 1994 until 2026.

It was the first line in the system when it opened, traveling from Denver's Five Points neighborhood through downtown Denver and terminating at I-25 & Broadway. It was extended along the Southwest Corridor to Littleton in 2000. Because it was the first and only line in the system, it had no letter or color designation until the Central Platte Valley Spur opened in 2002. During this time, it was designated internally as Route 101.

The D Line was eliminated in 2026, as a part of two separate RTD service changes which re-configured service on the Southwest Corridor.

== Route ==
In its final configuration, the D Line began in the downtown loop and proceeded south from downtown Denver, along with the H Line. It joined the E Line near the Auraria campus, and the three lines travelled south to I-25 & Broadway. South of this station, it diverged from the E and H Lines onto RTD's Southwest Corridor, paralleling US 85 and the Colorado Joint Line. Its southern terminus was at Littleton-Mineral.

== History ==
When it began service in 1994, its northern terminus was 30th & Downing station in Five Points. Its northern terminus was cut back to downtown with the commencement of L Line service in January 2018. Until 2020, it also ran alongside the F Line from the downtown loop to I-25 & Broadway, and the C Line from 10th & Osage station to Littleton-Mineral. Both lines were suspended due to the COVID-19 pandemic and officially eliminated in 2023.

Due to the Downtown Rail Reconstruction Project, the D Line's northern terminus had been diverted to Union Station in the summers of 2024 and 2025, following the route of the C Line but retaining the D Line designation. In June 2026, the D Line was instead suspended - rather than diverted - following resumption of construction, and trains using the Southwest Corridor began using the C Line designation for the first time since the pandemic. This temporary service pattern became permanent in RTD's September 2026 service change, restoring the C Line and eliminating the D Line from service.

== Stations ==
The table below shows the D Line's final service pattern and connections in 2026.

Station	Municipality	Opened	Major connections & notes
18th & California (northbound); 18th & Stout (southbound)	Denver	October 8, 1994	Flatiron Flyer
16th & California (northbound); 16th & Stout (southbound)	Denver	October 8, 1994	MallRide
14th & California (northbound); 14th & Stout (southbound)	Denver	October 8, 1994	Closed November 27, 2004
Theatre District–Convention Center	Denver	November 28, 2004	Regional Transportation District H Line (RTD)
Colfax at Auraria	Denver	October 8, 1994	Regional Transportation District H Line (RTD)
10th & Osage	Denver	October 8, 1994	Regional Transportation District E Line (RTD) H Line (RTD)
Alameda	Denver	October 8, 1994	Park and ride: 240 spaces
I-25 & Broadway	Denver	October 8, 1994	Park and ride: 988 spaces
Evans	Denver	July 14, 2000	Park and ride: 99 spaces
Englewood	Englewood	July 14, 2000	Park and ride: 910 spaces
Oxford–City of Sheridan	Sheridan	July 14, 2000	
Littleton–Downtown	Littleton	July 14, 2000	Park and ride: 361 spaces
Littleton–Mineral	Littleton	July 14, 2000	Park and ride: 1,227 spaces
