= H Line (RTD) =

Light rail line in the Denver metropolitan area

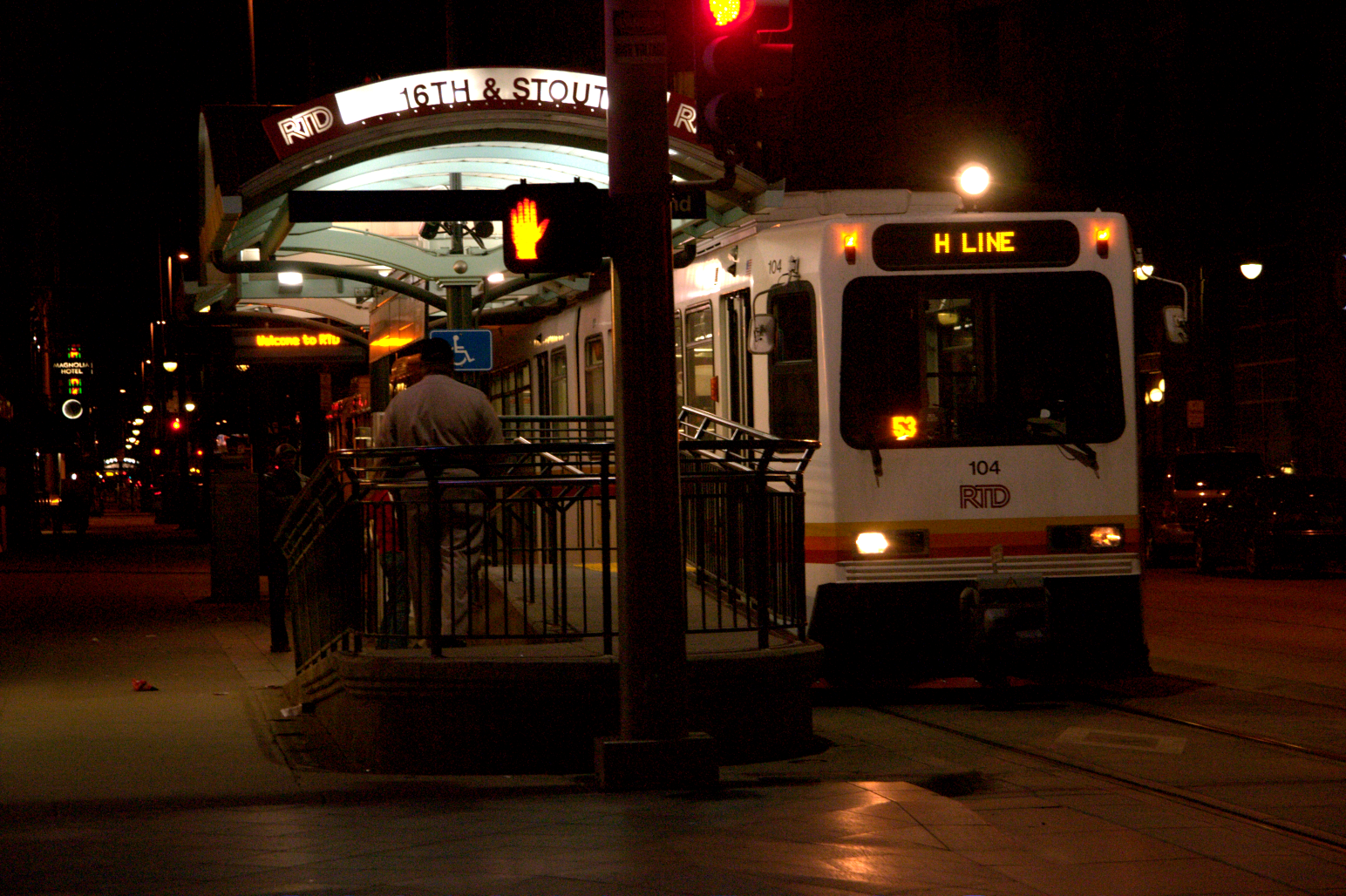
- H Line train at 16th & Stout station

Overview
- Other name: Aurora Line
- Status: Suspended
- Owner: Regional Transportation District
- Locale: Denver metropolitan area
- Termini: 18th & California/18th & Stout; Florida
- Stations: 16

Service
- Type: Light rail
- System: RTD Rail
- Operator: Regional Transportation District
- Ridership: 2,232,000 (FY2023, annual)

History
- Opened: November 17, 2006

Technical
- Track gauge: 4 ft 8 1/2 in (1,435 mm) standard gauge
- Electrification: Overhead line, 750 V DC
Route map
H Line highlighted in blue

The H Line is a Regional Transportation District (RTD) light rail line that serves stations in Denver and Aurora, Colorado. The line began service on November 17, 2006, with the completion of the Aurora Line as a part of the T-REX Project. When it opened, it was the first RTD rail service to Aurora, and remained the only such service until 2017. It is colored blue on system maps.

It is one of three routes that are part of the RTD's service plan for the corridor, alongside the E and R Lines. The H Line is currently suspended due to RTD's Downtown Rail Reconstruction Project. The line will resume operations following the conclusion of the project in 2027.

== Route ==
The H Line's route forms a "V" shape between downtown Denver and central Aurora, with its apex at the interchange between Interstate 25 and Interstate 225 in southeast Denver. The line begins in the downtown loop, proceeding out of downtown towards the Auraria campus. It joins the C and E Lines north of 10th & Osage station, and travels with them to I-25 & Broadway. The E and H Lines diverge from the C Line onto a flyover and parallel I-25 southeast to Southmoor station. At the interchange between I-25 and I-225, it diverges from the E Line and joins the R Line, now heading northeast. The two lines travel together to Florida station in Aurora, where the H Line terminates.

All stations along the H Line are shared with at least one other RTD rail line. The line's routing is indirect and many bus routes offer comparable or quicker travel times between downtown Denver and Aurora. However, the line is useful for passengers originating in south Denver or transferring to it from other lines for service to the downtown loop.

== History ==
When the H Line began operations in 2006, it operated from the downtown loop alongside the D Line to I-25 & Broadway and the F Line to Southmoor. It then joined with the G Line to its original terminus at Nine Mile station. The G Line was eliminated in 2009, leaving the H Line as the only service operating to Nine Mile until 2017. Service was extended northeast to Florida station in 2017 to coincide with the opening of the R Line, which utilized the G Line's former routing from Nine Mile to Lincoln station.

The F Line was suspended in 2020 as a result of the COVID-19 pandemic, and never returned to service. It was eliminated in RTD's January 2023 service change. The D Line was eliminated in RTD's June 2026 service change, which also restored the C Line. As a result of these service changes, the H Line is the only service operating from the downtown loop to points south of Denver.

As of September 2026, the H Line is suspended due to the Downtown Rail Reconstruction Project. Capacity along the line is being replaced by increased frequency on the R Line as well as a temporary "T Line" from I-25 & Broadway to Lincoln. When construction is complete, the H Line will be restored and the L Line will be extended to I-25 & Broadway station. This will replace capacity between that station and the downtown loop lost from the elimination of the D Line.

== Stations ==
Station	Municipality	Opened	Major connections & notes
18th & California (northbound); 18th & Stout (southbound)	Denver	October 8, 1994	Flatiron Flyer
16th & California (northbound); 16th & Stout (southbound)	Denver	October 8, 1994	MallRide
14th & California (northbound); 14th & Stout (southbound)	Denver	October 8, 1994	Closed November 27, 2004
Theatre District–Convention Center	Denver	November 28, 2004	Regional Transportation District L Line (RTD)
Colfax at Auraria	Denver	October 8, 1994	Regional Transportation District L Line (RTD)
10th & Osage	Denver	October 8, 1994	Regional Transportation District C Line (RTD) E Line (RTD) L Line (RTD)
Alameda	Denver	October 8, 1994	Park and ride: 240 spaces
I-25 & Broadway	Denver	October 8, 1994	Park and ride: 988 spaces
Louisiana–Pearl	Denver	November 17, 2006	Regional Transportation District E Line (RTD)
University of Denver	Denver	November 17, 2006	Park and ride: 540 spaces
Colorado	Denver	November 17, 2006	Park and ride: 363 spaces
Yale	Denver	November 17, 2006	Park and ride: 129 spaces
Southmoor	Denver	November 17, 2006	Park and ride: 788 spaces
Dayton	Aurora	November 17, 2006	Park and ride: 250 spaces
Nine Mile	Aurora	November 17, 2006	Park and ride: 1,225 spaces
Iliff	Aurora	February 24, 2017	Park and ride: 600 spaces
Florida	Aurora	February 24, 2017	Regional Transportation District R Line (RTD)

== FasTracks ==
The 2004 voter-approved FasTracks initiative extended the H Line approximately 3.5 mi (5.63 km) to the north along Interstate 225 with stops at Iliff Avenue and Florida Avenue. Work began in 2012, and the two station extension was combined with I-225 corridor light-rail line in 2013. Construction was long expected to be completed in 2016, however opening was delayed until February 24, 2017.
