= BYD K10MR =

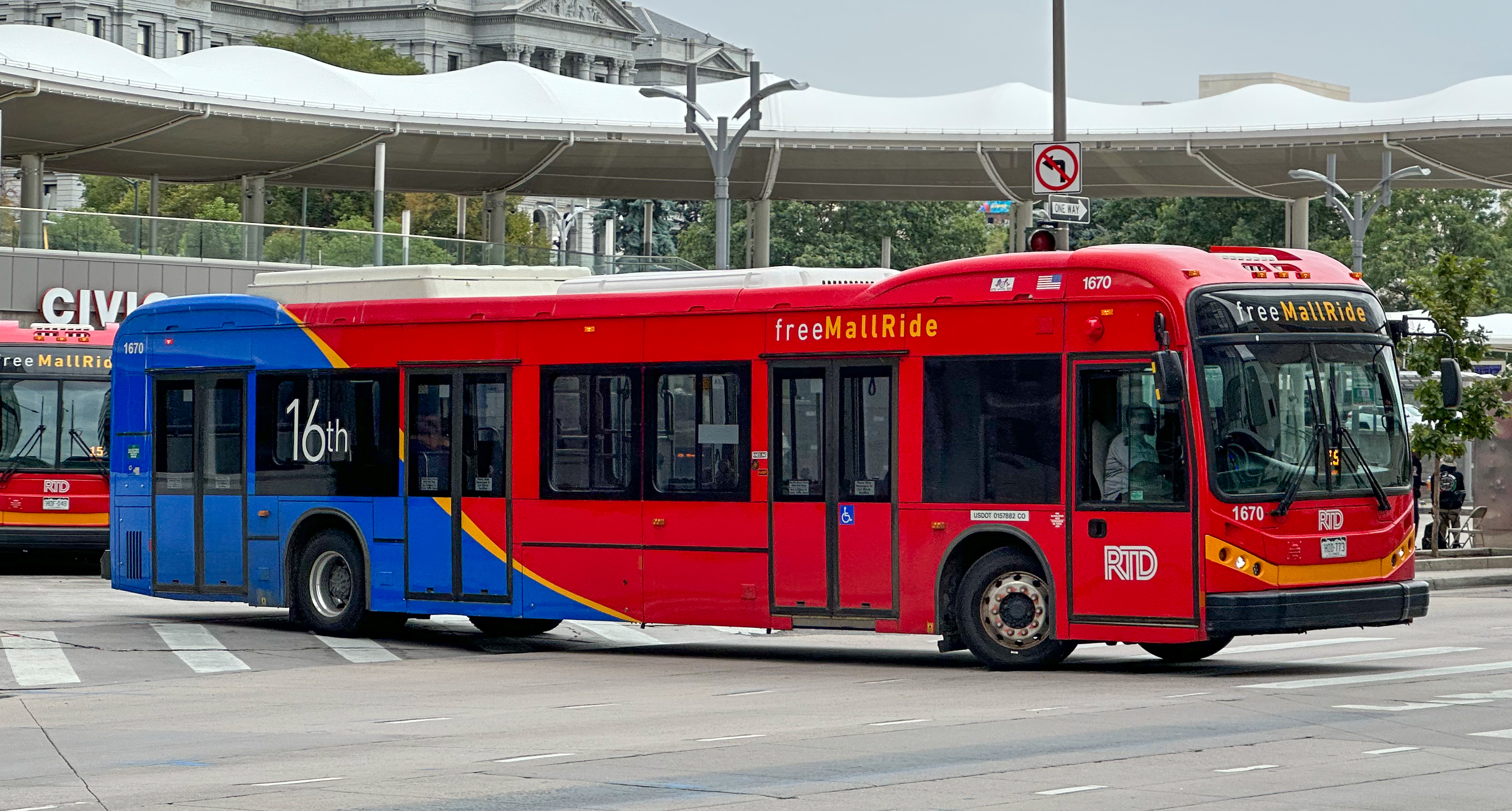
- BYD K10MR operating on the 16th Street FreeRide

Overview
- Manufacturer: BYD Auto
- Production: 2015–2016
- Assembly: Lancaster, California

Body and chassis
- Class: Transit bus
- Body style: Monocoque stressed-skin
- Related: BYD K series

Powertrain
- Electric motor: 2 × 90 kW (120.7 hp)
- Battery: 292 kWh lithium iron phosphate @ 540 V DC
- Plug-in charging: 80 kW @ 480 V AC

Dimensions
- Length: 45 ft (13.7 m)
- Curb weight: 30,000 lb (13,608 kg)

The BYD K10MR is a battery electric bus manufactured by BYD Auto for the Regional Transportation District's (RTD) 16th Street FreeRide shuttle in Denver, Colorado. It was developed specifically for operation on the 16th Street pedestrian mall.

== Design ==
The K10MR is a modified version of the BYD K10M, configured with right-hand drive, a fully low-floor layout, three passenger doors, and a separate driver's door. Since service began on the pedestrian-oriented 16th Street Mall, RTD has used custom-designed right-hand-drive buses. This configuration gives operators improved visibility of passengers boarding and alighting from the curb side, as well as pedestrians in the open mall setting. The low-floor design and open interior, combined with three doors, allow near-level boarding and accommodate fast passenger flow.

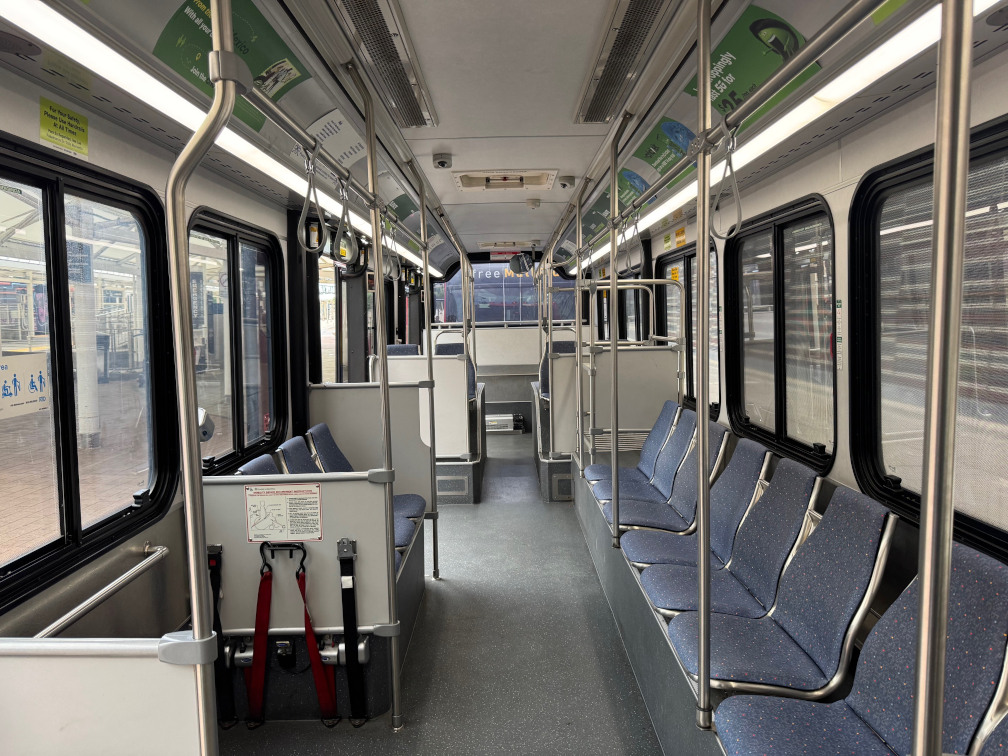
Interior of a BYD K10MR operating on the 16th Street FreeRide

The driver's compartment is separated from the passenger area, has an independent HVAC system, and is equipped with a "co-pilot seat" for trainers or supervisors. Passenger amenities include full air conditioning (a first for 16th Street shuttles), an automatic stop announcement system, a security camera system covering the interior and exterior, and a luggage rack for travelers connecting from Denver Union Station, which has train service to Denver International Airport. Accessibility features include two wheelchair securement areas, a manually operated ramp, and kneeling capability. Passenger capacity is 106 (18 seated, the remainder standing).

The buses have two operating modes: on-mall, which limits the maximum speed to 12 miles per hour (19 km/h) and lowers the suspension to curb height, and off-mall, which increases the maximum speed to 35 miles per hour (56 km/h) and returns the suspension to normal height. Propulsion is provided by two 90 kilowatts (120 hp) electric motors. The K10MR uses lithium iron phosphate batteries with a total capacity of 292 kWh, arranged in two 540 V DC packs in parallel. The buses produce zero tailpipe emissions and require no external heating or cooling of the batteries. Noise generators are fitted to alert visually impaired pedestrians. Battery state of charge and other data are transmitted every three minutes via a cellular Health Alert Management System (HAMS) and monitored remotely.

== Operation ==
In August 2015, RTD approved a US$27.1 million contract (equivalent to $35.9 million in 2024) to purchase 36 all-electric buses from BYD. Funding came from a combination of state transit funds and RTD local sources. The first K10MR was unveiled on August 29, 2016, with full fleet deployment over the following weeks.

The fleet is typically scheduled for a maximum of eight continuous service hours per day to maintain adequate battery reserves. Upon return to the depot, buses are cleaned, sorted by state of charge, and assigned to one of 30 charging stations. The sorting allows buses with the highest charge to be dispatched first. Each 80 kW, 480 V AC charger can replenish a bus from 20% to 100% in about 3.5 hours.

Compared to the compressed natural gas (CNG)-powered fleet they replaced, the K10MR buses are projected to reduce annual emissions by 13.34 pounds (6.05 kg) of nitrogen oxides (NO_{x}), 0.45 pounds (0.20 kg) of fine particulate matter (PM_{2.5}), and 88,680 pounds (40,220 kg) of greenhouse gases. Early estimates suggested energy consumption at one-sixth to one-eighth that of comparable diesel or CNG buses.
