= I-25 & Broadway station =

Light rail station in Denver, Colorado

I-25•Broadway
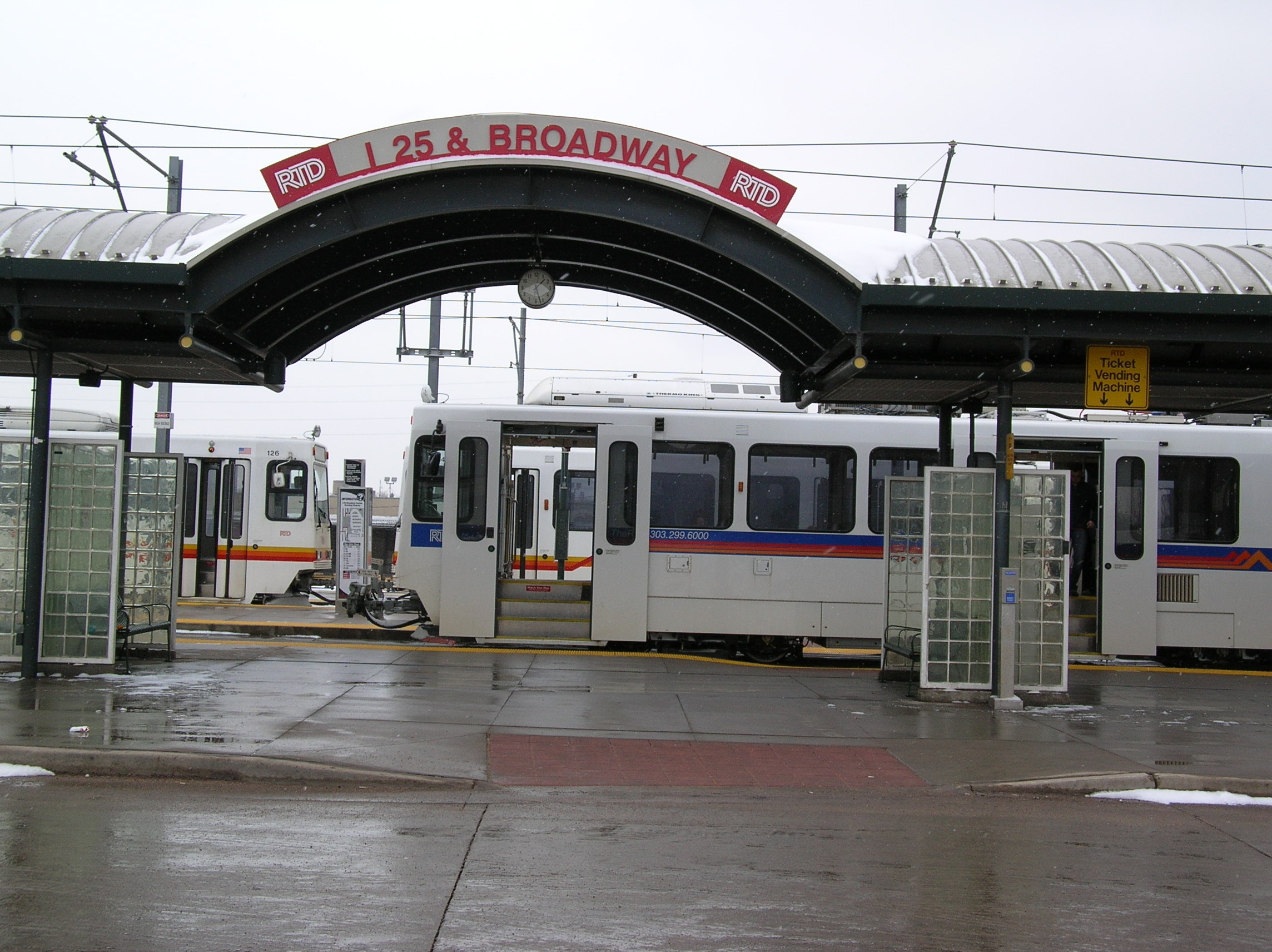
- Trains at the I-25 & Broadway station

General information
- Other names: I-25•Broadway
- Location: 901 South Broadway; Denver, Colorado
- Coordinates: 39.701698°N 104.990072°W
- Owner: Regional Transportation District
- Line: Central Corridor
- Platforms: 2 island platforms, 1 side platform
- Tracks: 3
- Connections: RTD Bus: 0, 0L, 11, 14

Construction
- Structure type: At-grade
- Parking: 988 spaces
- Cycle facilities: 38 racks, 30 lockers
- Accessible: Yes

History
- Opened: October 8, 1994

Passengers
- 2025: 4,196 (average daily)
- Rank: 4 out of 75

Services
| Preceding station | RTD | Following station |
|---|---|---|
| Alameda toward Union Station | C Line | Evans toward Littleton–Mineral |
| Alameda toward Union Station | E Line | Louisiana–Pearl toward RidgeGate Parkway |
| Alameda Terminus | T Line | Louisiana–Pearl toward Lincoln |
Former services
| Preceding station | RTD | Following station |
|---|---|---|
| Alameda toward 18th & California/Stout | D Line | Evans toward Littleton–Mineral |
| Alameda toward 18th & California | F Line | Louisiana–Pearl toward RidgeGate Parkway |
Future services
| Preceding station | RTD | Following station |
|---|---|---|
| Alameda toward 18th & California/Stout | H Line Suspended | Louisiana–Pearl toward Florida |
| Alameda toward 30th & Downing | L Line Suspended | Terminus |
Location

I-25 & Broadway station (sometimes stylized as I-25•Broadway) is a three-platform RTD light rail station in Denver, Colorado. The station was opened on October 8, 1994, and is operated by the Regional Transportation District. It is currently served by the C, E, and T lines.

As its name implies, the station is located at the interchange between Interstate 25 and South Broadway in south-central Denver. It is the final station shared by all lines southbound from 10th & Osage station, and is the designated transfer point for southbound passengers traveling to Englewood and Littleton on the C Line, and to the Denver Tech Center, Centennial, and Lone Tree on the E and T Lines.

The station is typically served by the H Line, which is suspended as of September 2026 due to the Downtown Rail Reconstruction Project. The L Line, which is also suspended due to the project, is planned to be extended to the station. When service on the H and L Lines is restored, the station will serve as the southern terminus of the L Line, and will resume being the designated transfer point for southbound passengers traveling to Aurora on the H Line.

== Station layout ==
1F

Platform Level

South Broadway; West Kentucky Avenue; bus bays; parking
Side platform, doors will open on both sides
Northbound
← toward Union Station (Alameda)
← toward Alameda (Terminus)
Island platform, doors will open on both sides
Southbound
toward RidgeGate Parkway (Louisiana & Pearl) →
toward Lincoln (Louisiana & Pearl) →
Island platform, doors will open on the left or both sides
Southbound
toward Littleton-Mineral (Evans) →

I-25 & Broadway station includes three tracks in order to accommodate the Southeast and Southwest Corridors, which split from one another immediately south of the station. To access the island platforms in the station, the northbound, and possibly southeast-bound, tracks must be crossed at-grade. The station has parking lots around the entrance, with a bus bay sitting between them and the train platforms.

Tracks in this station are laid out in a wye. Trains originating at the yard south of Evans Station and bound for the Southeast Line bypass I-25 & Broadway platforms, but operate in service from Evans Station. Trains returning to the yard do not operate in service. I-25 & Broadway is the southernmost transfer station for all lines leading north toward the 10th & Osage station.

== History ==
When the system was first opened in 1994, I-25 & Broadway was the southern terminus of the entire light rail system, at the time being served by just one route to 30th & Downing. On July 14, 2000, the station began seeing onward southbound service with the opening of the Southwest Corridor, and was eventually served by the C and D Lines. I-25 & Broadway became a major transfer point on November 17, 2006 with the completion of the T-REX project, upon which the station began seeing service to the southeast on the E, F, and H lines.

Service at I-25 & Broadway has varied throughout its history. The C and F Lines were suspended in January 2021 and October 2020, respectively, due to a reduction in ridership caused by the COVID-19 pandemic. Both lines were eliminated on January 8, 2023., leaving the E Line to serve passengers bound for Union Station, and the D and H Lines to serve passengers bound for the downtown loop.

On June 7, 2026, the C Line returned to service for the first time since 2021 due to the Downtown Rail Reconstruction Project. The D Line was suspended in the same service change; while initially temporary, this service pattern became permanent on September 27, 2026. The L Line is planned to be extended to the station in 2027 in order to replace service toward the downtown loop lost by the elimination of the D Line. Therefore, when the Downtown Rail Reconstruction Project is complete, the station will see service toward Union Station on the C and E Lines, and toward the downtown loop on the H and L Lines.

In 2023, the City of Denver approved plans to construct a pedestrian bridge from the I-25 & Broadway station to the west, in order to provide pedestrian access to a future development adjacent to the station as well as the South Platte River Trail. The bridge will be 375 feet upon its completion, with the 220 foot center section being the longest unsupported single span truss in the state of Colorado. The pedestrian bridge will also connect the station to Denver Summit FC Stadium, a 14,000-seat soccer-specific venue that will be the first in the city purpose-built for a women's sports team.

== Public art ==
I-25 & Broadway station features three granite sculptures titled The Welcoming Committee, as a part of RTD's Art-n-Transit program. The art piece, created by Elaine Calzolari, was installed in 1997 within the station's bus loop. The sculptures are made up primarily of salvaged materials from demolished buildings, an old mausoleum, and granite quarries.

== Gallery ==
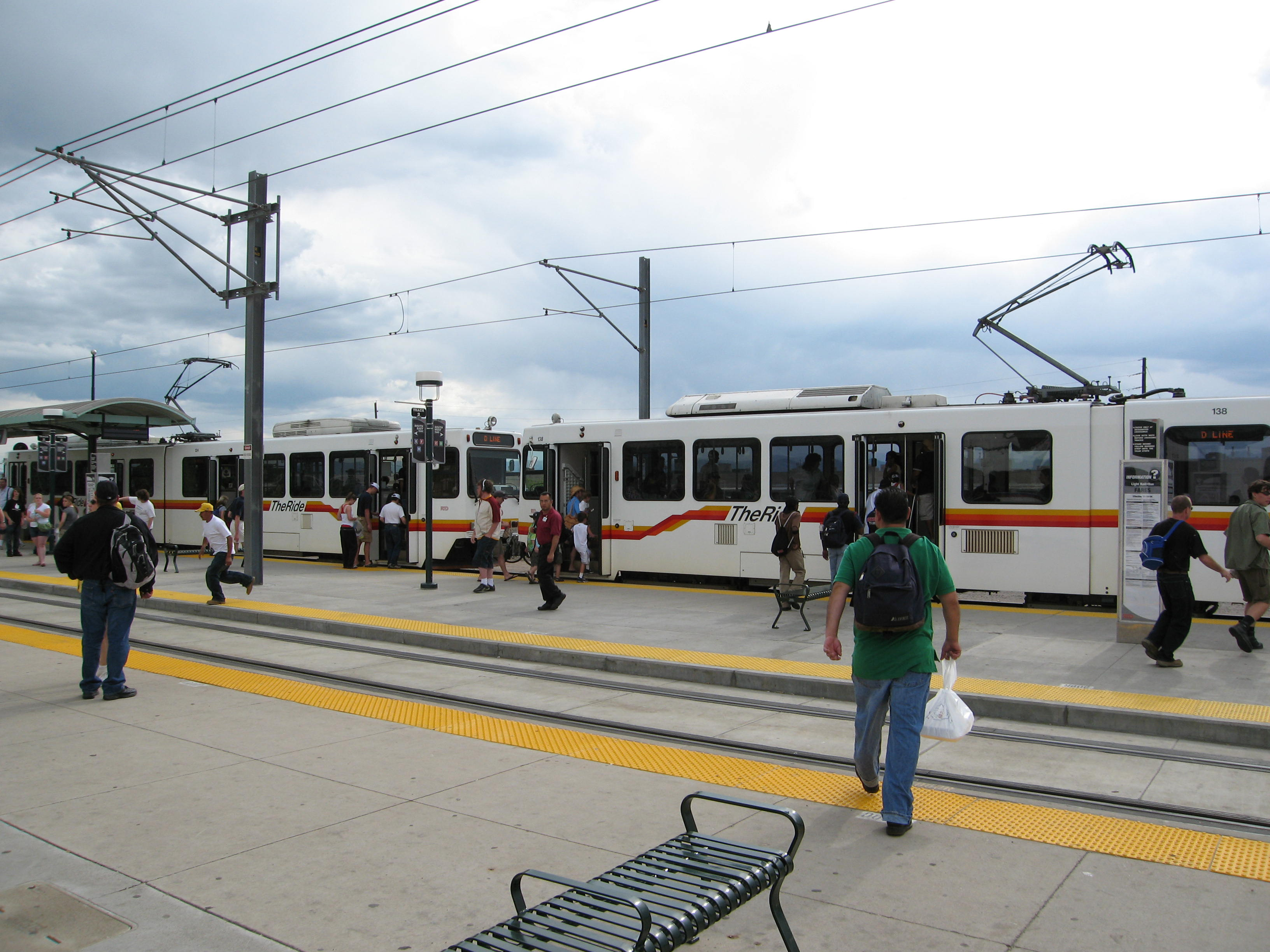
I-25 & Broadway Station

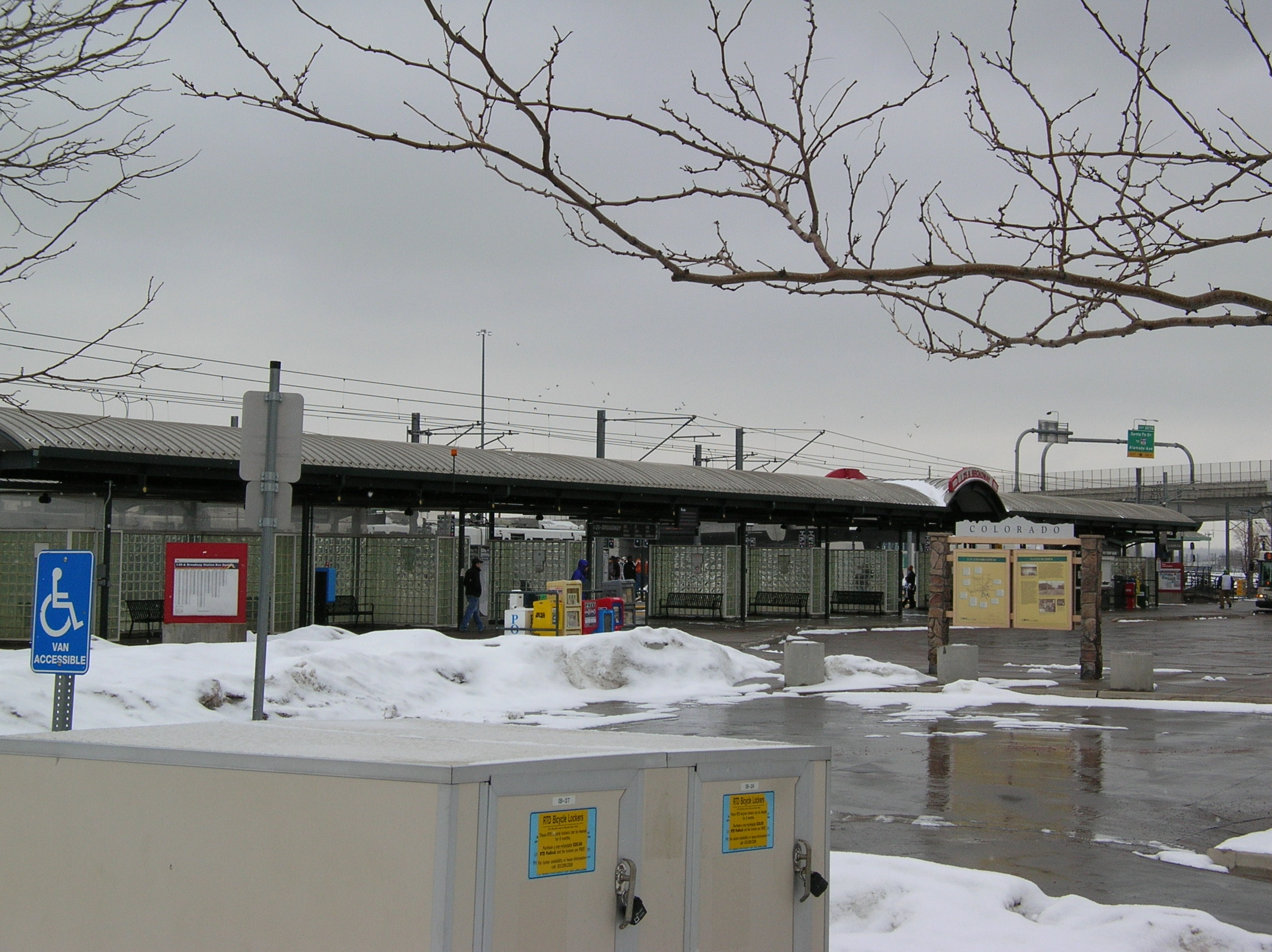
I-25 & Broadway Station

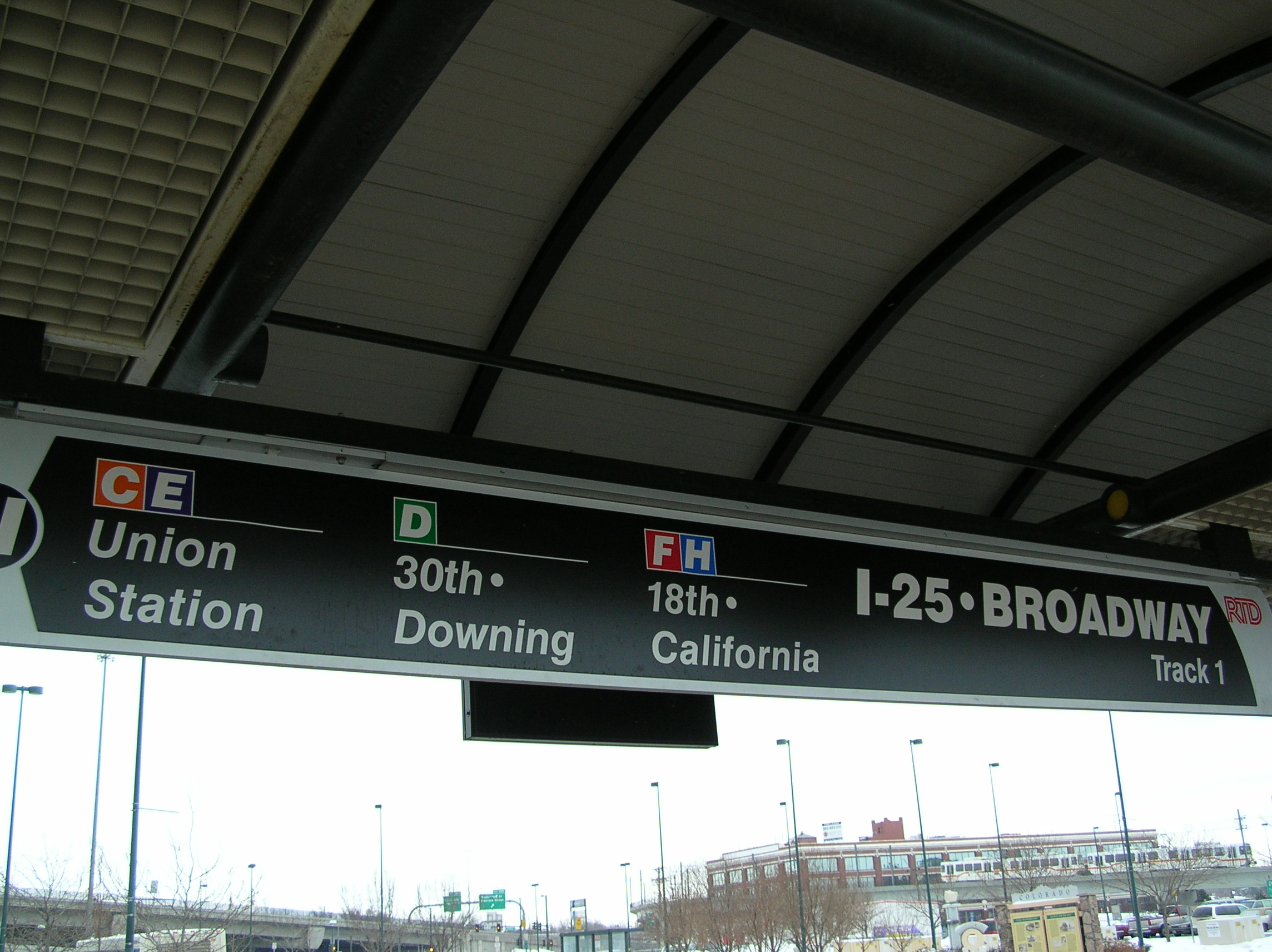
Signage at the I-25 & Broadway Station (2006-2018)
