= L Line (RTD) =

Light rail line in the Denver metropolitan area

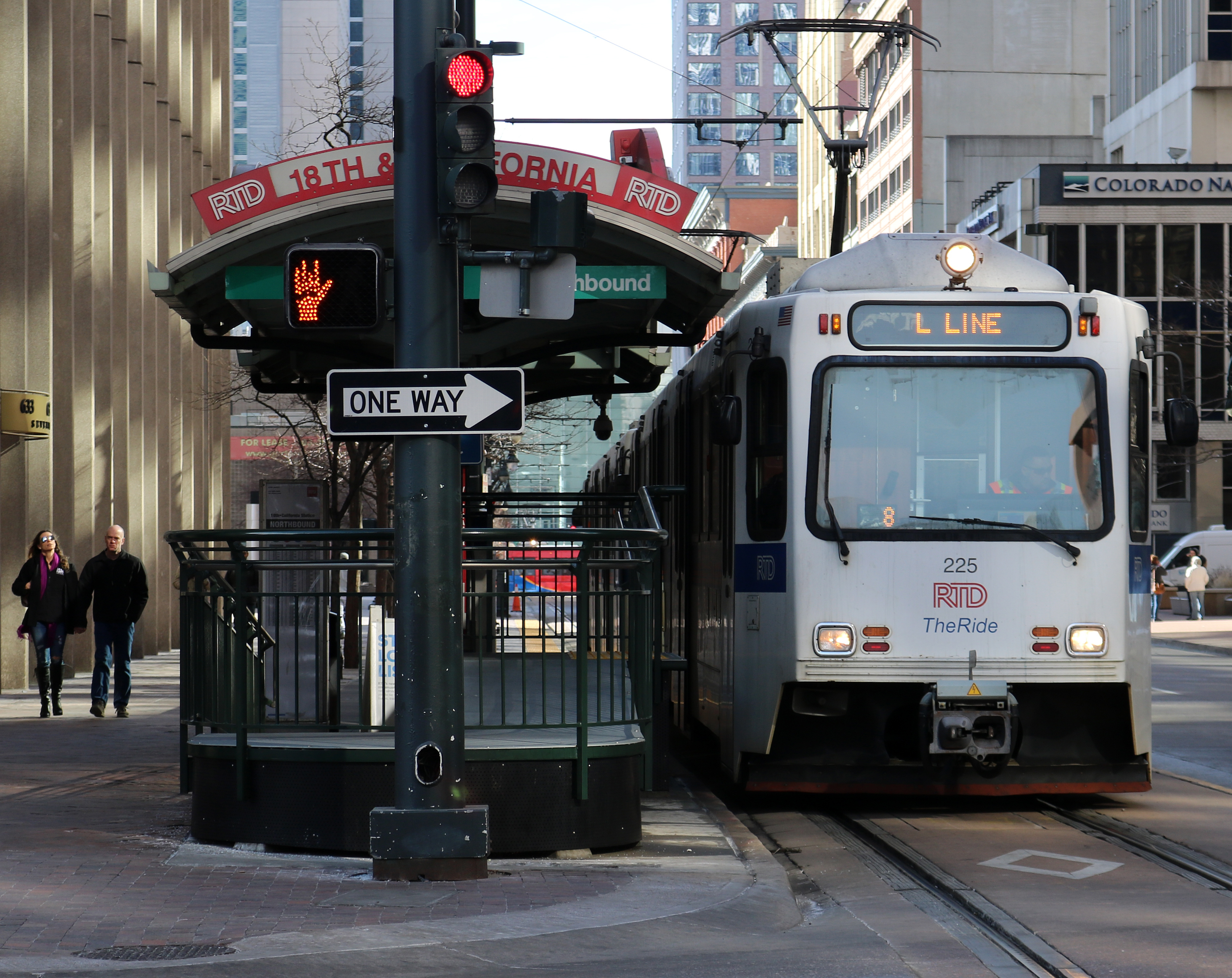
- Northbound L Line train at 18th & California station

Overview
- Other name: Central Line
- Status: Suspended
- Owner: Regional Transportation District
- Locale: Denver
- Termini: 30th & Downing; 16th & California/16th & Stout I-25 & Broadway (2027)
- Stations: 11

Service
- Type: Light rail
- System: RTD Rail
- Operator: Regional Transportation District
- Ridership: 339,000 (FY2023, annual)

History
- Opened: January 14, 2018

Technical
- Number of tracks: 1–2
- Track gauge: 4 ft 8 1/2 in (1,435 mm) standard gauge
- Electrification: Overhead line, 750 V DC
Route map
L Line highlighted in yellow

The L Line is a Regional Transportation District (RTD) light rail line that serves stations exclusively in downtown Denver, Colorado. It began operations as a part of RTD's January 2018 service change along the Central Line and was formed by a truncated section of the D Line, which formerly served the route. It is colored yellow on system maps.

The L Line is currently suspended due to RTD's Downtown Rail Reconstruction Project. The line will resume operations following the conclusion of the project in 2027.

== Route ==
The L Line begins at 30th & Downing station in Denver's Five Points neighborhood. From there, it runs southwest along Welton Street using a single track. The line becomes double-tracked at 24th Street and continues southwest, before turning on 19th Street, where it meets the H Line and begins its journey through the downtown loop. The loop consists of 19th Street, Stout Street, 14th Street, and California Street, with stations serving 16th Street at both of the loop's intersections with it. The L Line completes the loop upon leaving 18th & California station, at which point it heads back to 30th & Downing along Welton Street.

The L Line "terminates" at 16th & Stout station, in the downtown loop. The station is the transfer point to continue south of downtown on the H Line. However, the train does not go out of service and passengers can remain on board as the train loops back to 16th & California station, one block southeast of 16th & Stout.

== History ==
RTD's 2014 Central Rail Extension Mobility Study Final Report proposed that the D Line stations from 20th & Welton to 30th & Downing be operated on an independent route. This route would operate exclusively between the downtown loop and Five Points, with a new transfer for D Line riders as the D Line's new northern terminus would be in the downtown loop (nominally 18th & California station).

RTD's board of directors approved the introduction of this line, effective as of its January 2018 service change. It is the first, and only as of 2026, new RTD service to wholly utilize existing track.

=== Extension to I-25 & Broadway ===
The D Line was eliminated from service in 2026 as a part of two separate RTD service changes re-configuring the Southwest Corridor. When the L Line resumes service in 2027, it will be extended to I-25 & Broadway station and replace lost capacity toward the downtown loop from the D Line. It will also eliminate the need to transfer at 16th & Stout going southbound and 18th & California going northbound. All transfers will be consolidated at I-25 & Broadway, which has a much higher transfer capacity.

This service pattern was trialed in late 2025 following the completion of the previous phase of the Downtown Rail Reconstruction Project. With the L Line still suspended, RTD introduced a special holiday " S Line" service, running between I-25 & Broadway and 30th & Downing. The S Line ran from November 2025 through January 2026, at which point the L Line resumed as a part of RTD's January 2026 service change.

=== Planned extension to 38th & Blake ===
FasTracks provisions for an extension of the L Line north along Downing Street, to a new terminus at 38th & Blake station. This would provide a direct connection from Five Points and the downtown loop to Aurora and Denver International Airport via the A Line. Two intermediate stations at 33rd & Downing and 35th & Downing are also planned. As of 2026, this extension is unfunded and there is no estimated completion date.

== Stations ==
The table below shows the L Line's future service pattern and connections when the line resumes operations in 2027.

The entire route is in Denver. From north to south, six Denver neighborhoods are served by the L Line: Whittier, Five Points, Central Business District, Auraria, La Alma-Lincoln Park, and Baker.

Station	Opening year	Major connections & notes
38th & Blake	—N/a	Park and ride: 200 spaces
35th & Downing	—N/a	
33rd & Downing	—N/a	
30th & Downing	October 8, 1994	Park and ride: 27 spaces
29th & Welton	October 8, 1994	Closed January 6, 2013
27th & Welton	December 19, 1995	
25th & Welton	October 8, 1994	
20th & Welton	October 8, 1994	
18th & California (northbound); 18th & Stout (southbound)	October 8, 1994	Flatiron Flyer
16th & California (northbound); 16th & Stout (southbound)	October 8, 1994	MallRide
14th & California (northbound); 14th & Stout (southbound)	October 8, 1994	Closed November 27, 2004
Theatre District–Convention Center	November 28, 2004	Regional Transportation District H Line (RTD)
Colfax at Auraria	October 8, 1994	Regional Transportation District H Line (RTD)
10th & Osage	October 8, 1994	Regional Transportation District C Line (RTD) E Line (RTD) H Line (RTD)
Alameda	October 8, 1994	Park and ride: 240 spaces
I-25 & Broadway	October 8, 1994	Park and ride: 988 spaces
