= 18th & California and 18th & Stout stations =

Light rail stations in Denver, Colorado

18th•California 18th•Stout
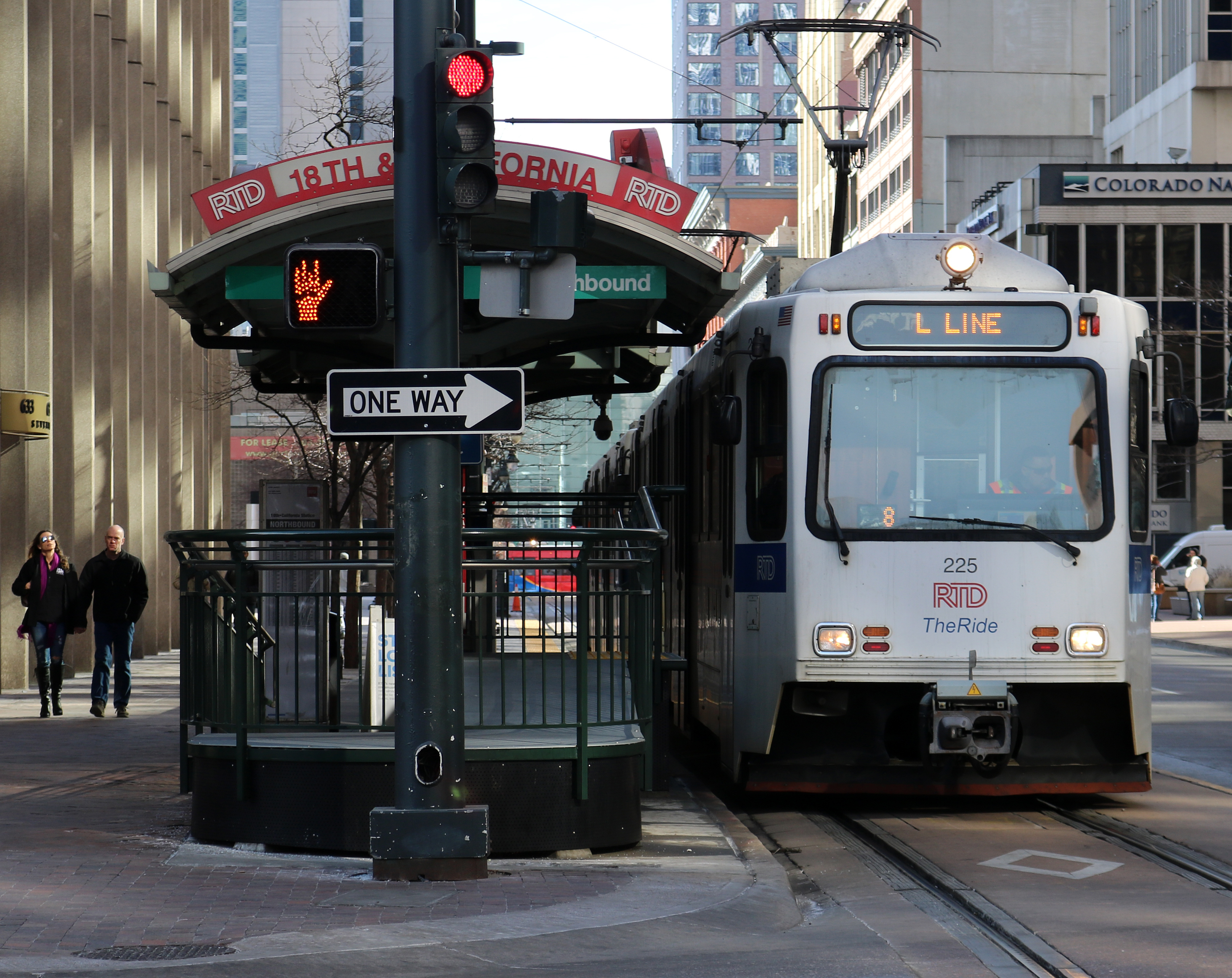
- Northbound L Line train at 18th & California station platform

General information
- Location: 1776 California Street; 1816 Stout Street; Denver, Colorado
- Coordinates: 39.747369°N 104.990208°W
- Owner: Regional Transportation District
- Line: Central Corridor
- Platforms: 2 split side platforms
- Tracks: 2
- Connections: RTD Bus: MetroRide, 0, 1, 6, 9, 10, 15, 15L, 19, 20, 28, 32, 38, 43, 44, 48, 52, ART

Construction
- Structure type: At-grade
- Accessible: Yes

History
- Opened: October 8, 1994

Passengers
- 2025: 2,230 (average daily)
- Rank: 10 out of 75 (combined)

Services
Preceding station	RTD	Following station
Terminus	H Line Suspended	16th & California/Stout toward Florida
20th & Welton toward 30th & Downing	L Line Suspended	16th & California/Stout toward I-25 & Broadway
Former services
Preceding station	RTD	Following station
Terminus	D Line	16th & California/Stout toward Littleton–Mineral
Terminus	F Line	16th & California/Stout toward RidgeGate Parkway
Location

18th & California and 18th & Stout stations (sometimes styled as 18th•California and 18th•Stout) are a pair of light rail stations in Downtown Denver, Colorado, United States. They are served by the H and L lines, operated by the Regional Transportation District (RTD), and were opened on October 8, 1994. The stations have one track each and are one city block apart. 18th & California is served only by northbound trains and 18th & Stout is served only by southbound trains.

18th & California is the inbound terminus of the H Line; passengers must transfer to L Line trains to continue along Welton Street and toward 30th & Downing.

== Station layout ==
=== 18th & Stout ===
1F

Platform Level

MetroRide toward Union Station or Civic Center; other bus connections
Side platform, doors will open on the right
Southbound
← toward Florida (16th & Stout)
← toward 16th & Stout (Terminus)
Stout Street (one way) →

=== 18th & California ===
1F

Platform Level

← California Street (one way)
Northbound
terminates (loop track to 18th & Stout) →
toward 30th & Downing (20th & Welton) →
Side platform, doors will open on the right
MetroRide toward Civic Center or Union Station; other bus connections

== Gallery ==
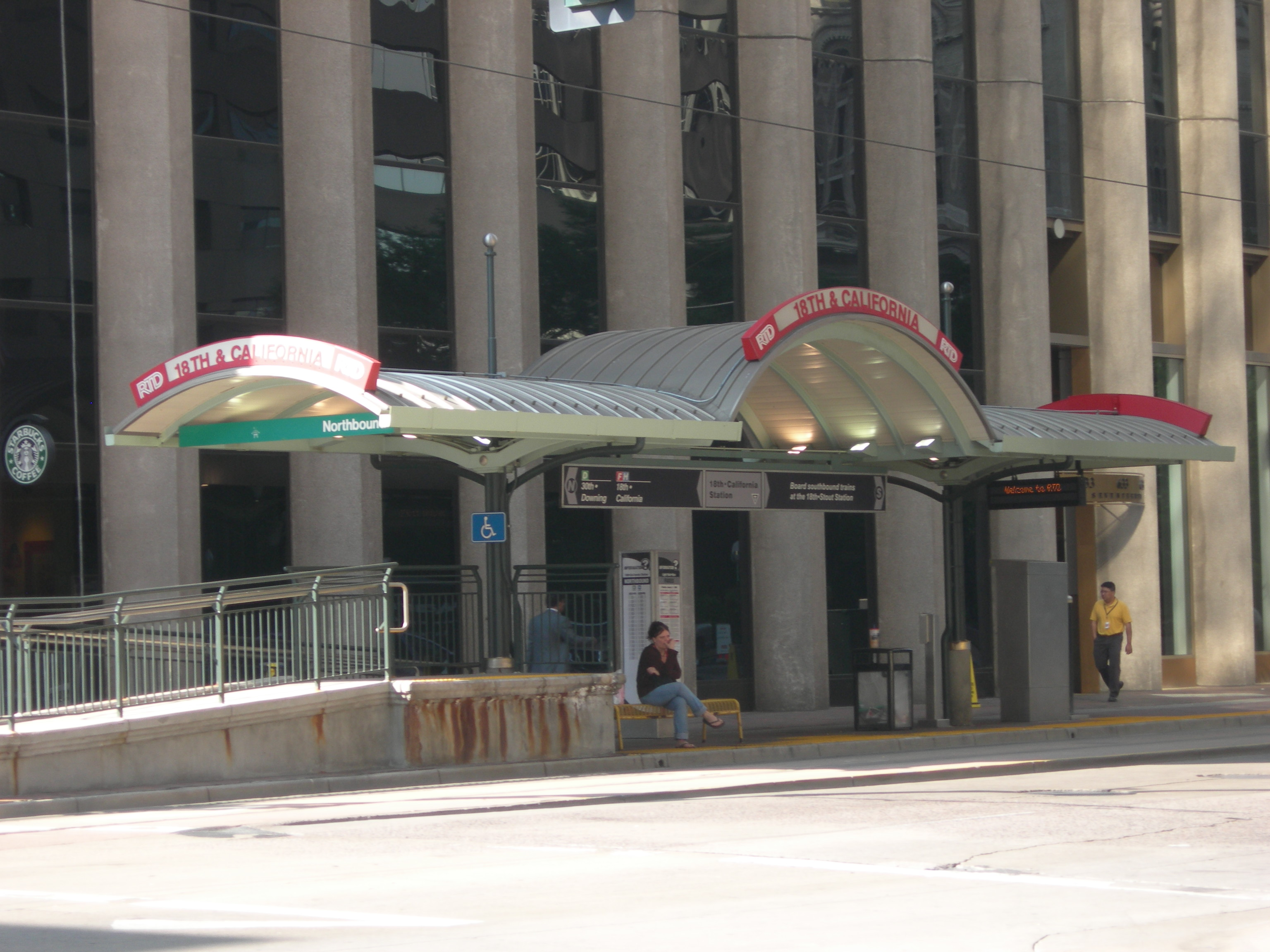
18th & California station

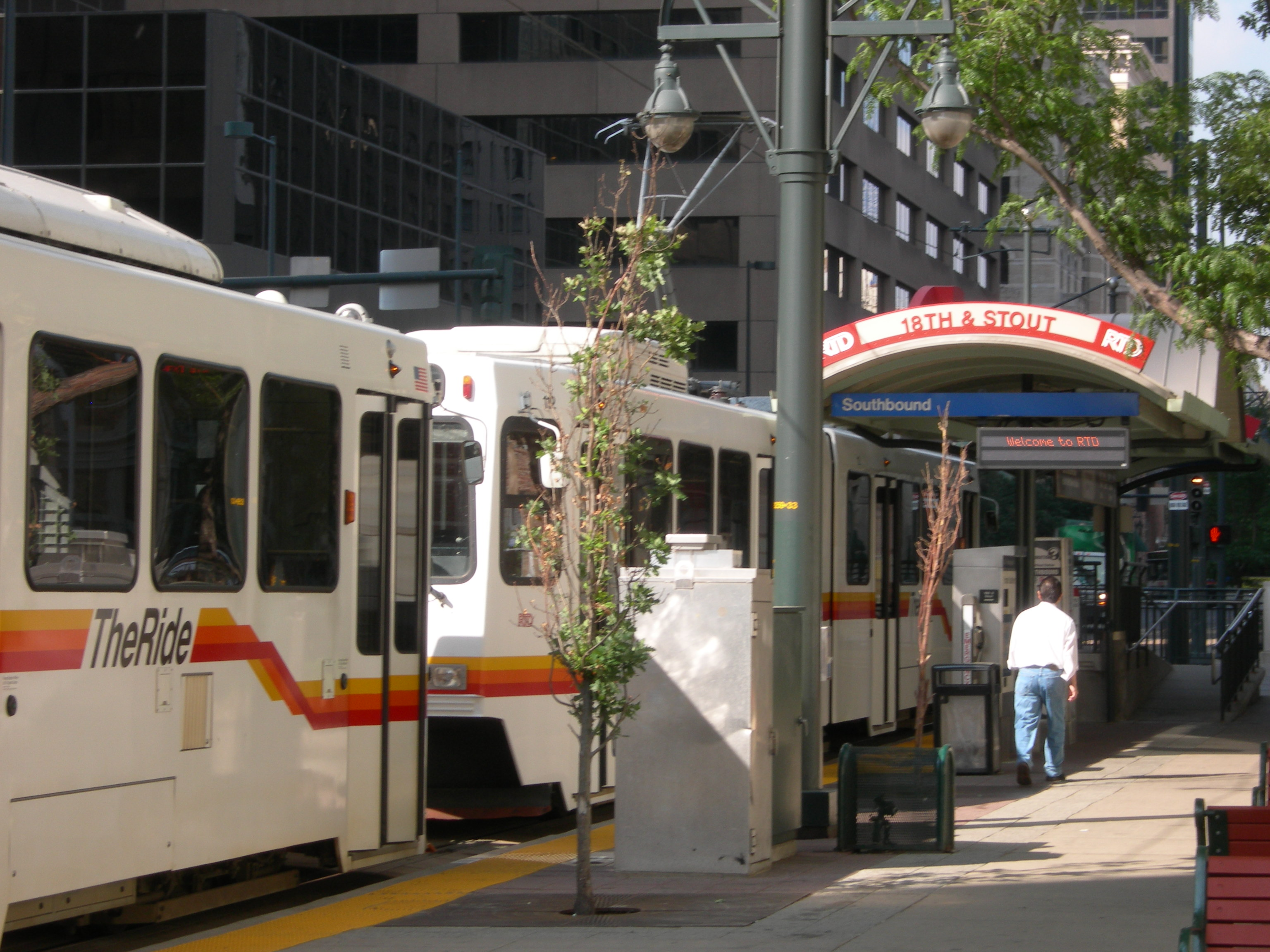
18th & Stout station
