= 16th Street (Denver) =

Pedestrian and transit mall in Denver, Colorado, United States

Coordinates: 39°44′55″N 104°59′48″W

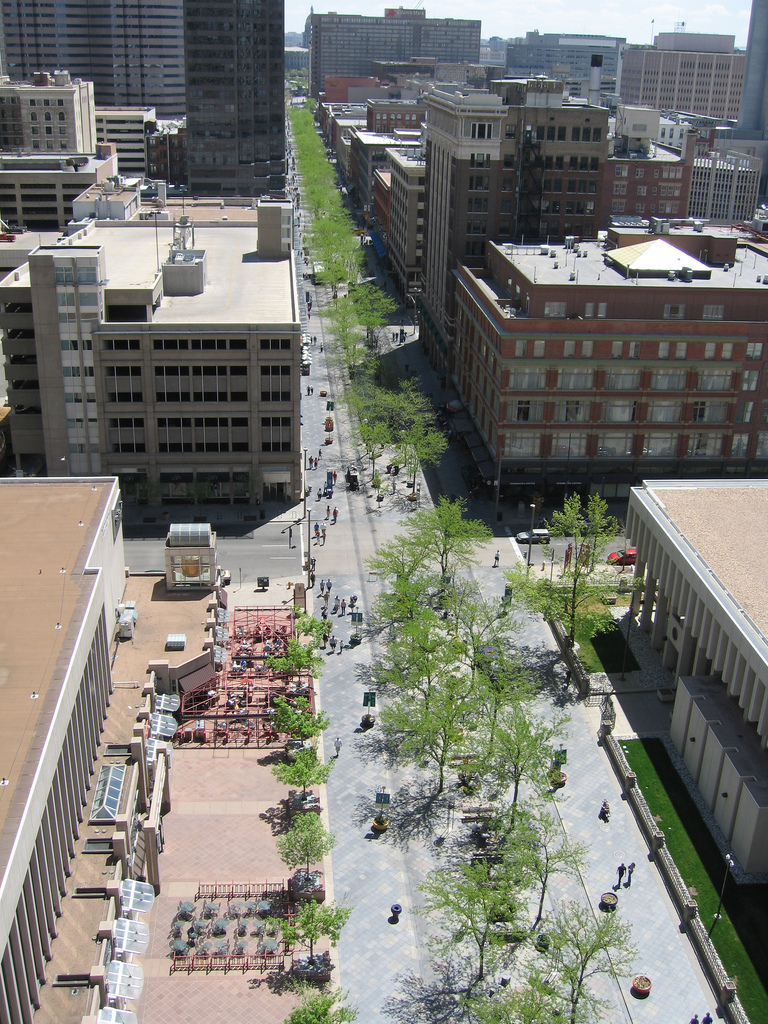
16th Street Mall as seen from the Daniels & Fisher Tower

16th Street, formerly the 16th Street Mall, is a 1 1/4-mile (2.0 km) pedestrian and transit mall in downtown Denver, Colorado, opened in 1982 to ease bus congestion and improve pedestrian access. The original portion was designed by architect I. M. Pei, its granite paving forms an intricate pattern inspired by the western diamondback rattlesnake and Navajo weaving. The pedestrian only parts of the street extend from Wynkoop Street to Civic Center Station at Broadway, with the 16th Street FreeRide shuttle bus stopping at every intersection and extending to Union Station. The street hosts hundreds of stores and restaurants, including the Denver Pavilions shopping center.

== History ==
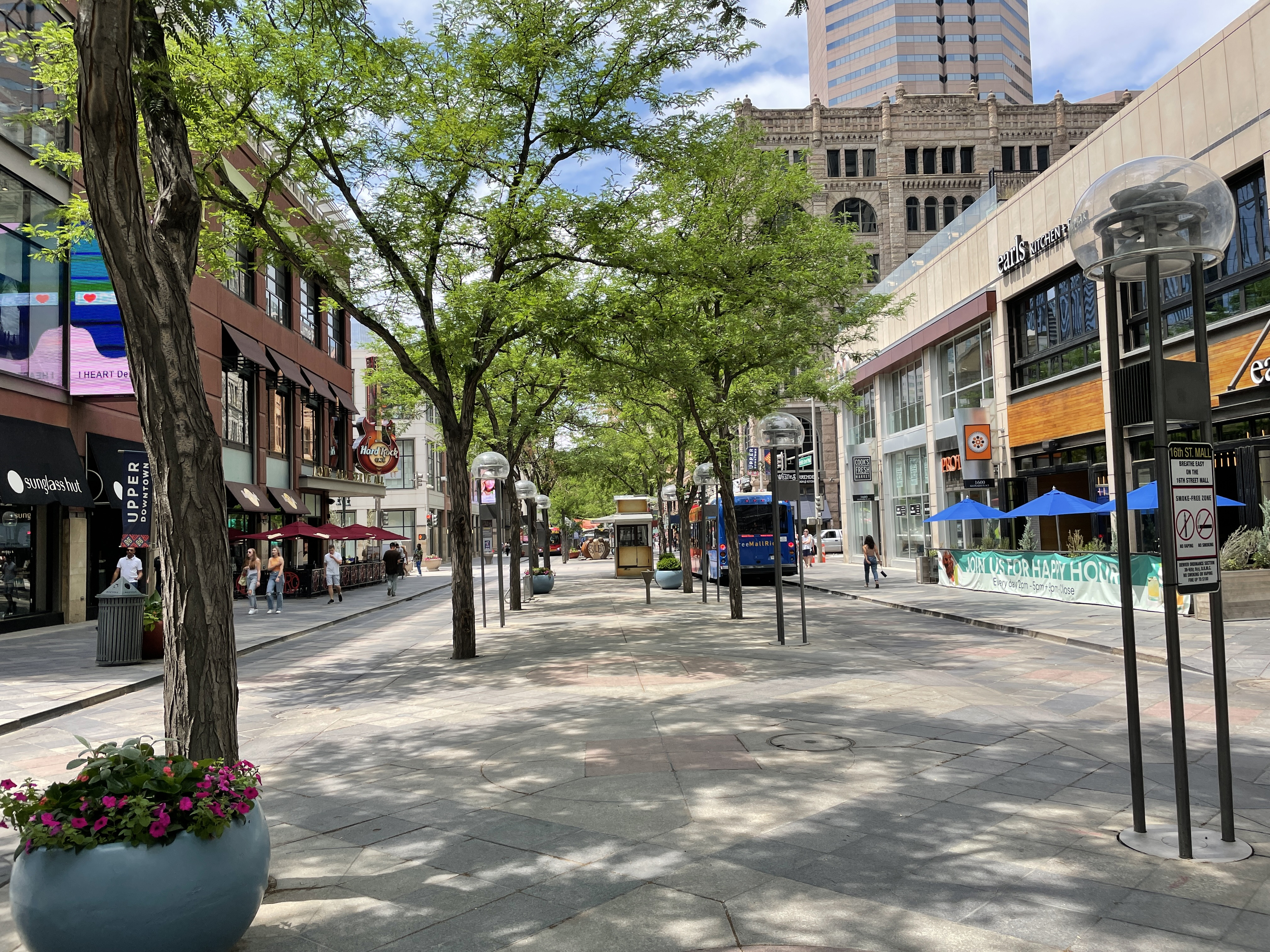
16th Street Mall looking northwest past Tremont Place

For Denver, 16th Street has long been an important commercial street. In the 1960s it was lined with movie theaters, department stores, banks, and retail outlets. However, by the 1970s, downtown Denver faced severe bus congestion on 16th and 17th streets, more than 600 daily trips, contributing to air pollution and traffic congestion. The area's design also discouraged pedestrian activity. To address these issues, the downtown business community and the Regional Transportation District (RTD) proposed building bus transfer stations at Market Street and Broadway, connected by a pedestrian mall with a free shuttle bus service. The final design was developed by I. M. Pei & Partners in collaboration with the urban design and landscape architecture firm OLIN. Construction was funded by a US$75 million grant (equivalent to $293.1 million in 2025) from Federal Interstate Highway Transfer Funds and the Federal Urban Mass Transit Administration, with RTD providing a local match.

The original 12 1/2-block, 4/5-mile (1.3 km) 16th Street Mall is considered a landmark of late-20th-century design, combining post–World War II Modernist geometry and lighting with Postmodern references to western motifs. Its granite paving—19-inch (48 cm) square blocks in charcoal gray, light gray, and "Colorado red"—forms a diamond pattern inspired by Navajo blankets and diamondback rattlesnake skin. Other unique elements include distinctive light standards, northern red oaks and honey locust trees in engineered root boxes, fiberglass street furniture, and metal signage.

After two years of construction, the Mall opened on October 4, 1982, with a ceremony that drew more than 200,000 visitors downtown. The Mall initially ran from Market Street Station to Civic Center Station at Broadway. Consolidating shuttle service along the route removed about 870 daily bus trips from surrounding streets, by funneling express and regional commuter buses to the bus stations. The Federal Transit Administration classifies the mall as a "fixed guideway", enabling RTD to receive operating funds under the same formula as a rail line. In 1994, the addition of light rail service on California and Stout streets added a third transit hub to the mall.

The improvements on the street were extended three block into Lower Downtown in 1994 reaching Wynkoop Street, which included the demolition of the 16th Street Viaduct. Four more blocks into the Central Platte Valley district were added in 2012 ending at Wewatta Street. These extensions feature wide sidewalks and streetscape upgrades but not the older Mall's granite paving, reaching a total length of 1 1/4-mile (2.0 km) and 18 1/2-blocks. However, the segment from Wewatta to Wynkoop Streets is partly open to local vehicle traffic.

RTD purchased Union Station in 2001 and started the process of redeveloping the historic station along with 19.85 acres (8.03 ha) of land in LoDo, to create a new transit hub that would replace Market Street Station. To enable the project, the Free MallRide was extended west from Market Street to Wynkoop Street that year and to Union Station in 2002, coinciding with the opening of a new light rail spur. In 2014, RTD opened an underground bus concourse at Union Station and closed Market Street Station. The land was sold to a developer for $11 million, which helped fund the redevelopment of Union Station, and the station site was transformed into a mixed-use building with residential, office, retail and restaurant space.

By the 2010s, the granite paving was showing significant deterioration, prompting multiple studies calling for comprehensive reconstruction. In April 2022, work began on a $149 million rebuild, with a planned completion date of fall 2025. The project removed the 22-foot-wide (6.7 m) median "amenity zone" between Arapahoe and Tremont streets—which was considered underutilized due to its isolation—and replaced it with a center-running transitway, with 28-foot-wide (8.5 m) pedestrian zones on each side, which will provide patios and other amenity areas, while leaving 10-foot (3.0 m) unobstructed walkways. Of the 199 honey locust trees and 83 northern red oaks of the original mall, only 143 locusts were still alive and the majority of the oaks had died by 2023. The remaining trees were nearing the end of their lifespan and removed and replanted with new honey locusts as well as overcup oaks, swamp white oaks, Kentucky coffeetrees, 'Morton' elms, and 'Morton' Miyabe maples. The renovation project concluded in 2025 with a cerebration of the reopening on October 4. With the end of the project it was officially renamed as simply 16th Street, dropping mall from the name of the pedestrian portion of the street.

== FreeRide ==
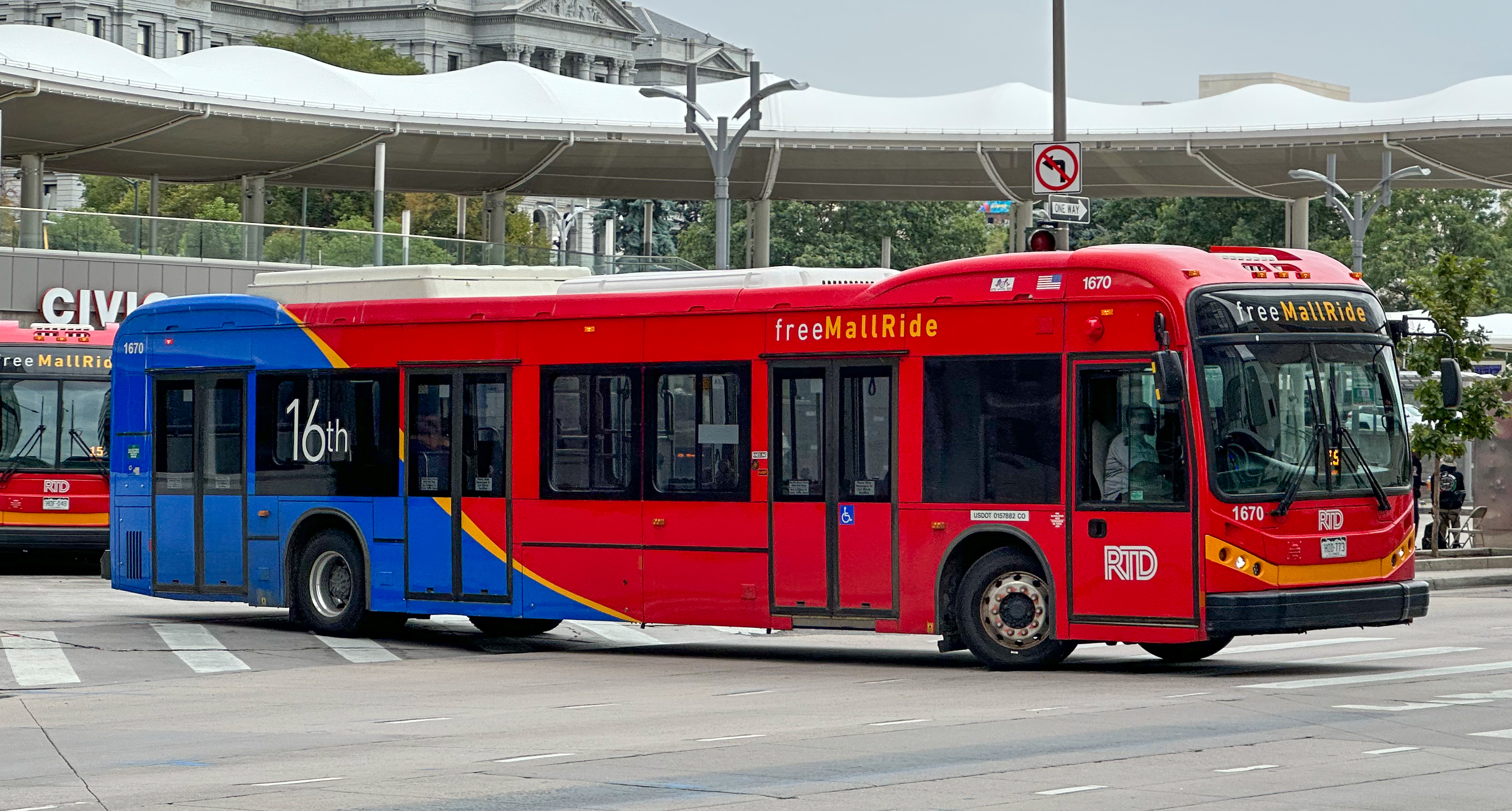
Third-generation BYD K10MR used on the FreeRide, a battery electric bus

The 16th Street FreeRide is a free shuttle bus service operated by the RTD along the length of the 16th Street Mall, with buses stopping at every intersection.

The service began in 1982 as the 16th Street MallRide, originally running between Market Street Station and Civic Center Station (16th & Broadway), two major RTD bus hubs at either end of downtown. In 1994, light rail transit service was added at 16th & California and 16th & Stout stations, creating a third transit hub along the mall. In 2011, the route was extended north of the mall on 16th Street to Denver Union Station. In 2014, Market Street Station was closed and replaced by the Union Station Transit Center. In 2025, coinciding with the dropping of "Mall" from the 16th Street Mall name, the service was renamed 16th Street FreeRide.

As of 2026, the route provides connections between the A Line, B Line, C Line, E Line, G Line, N Line, W Line, and the bus hub at Union Station; the H Line and L Line at 16th & California and 16th & Stout stations; and the bus hub at Civic Center Station. In 2018, the route saw an average weekday ridership of 43,971, making it the busiest operated by RTD.

Buses operate from 5:30 a.m. to midnight on weekdays, with slightly shorter service hours on weekends and holidays. During peak periods, shuttles can run as frequently as every 90 seconds, with service reduced to every 10 minutes in the early morning and late evening.

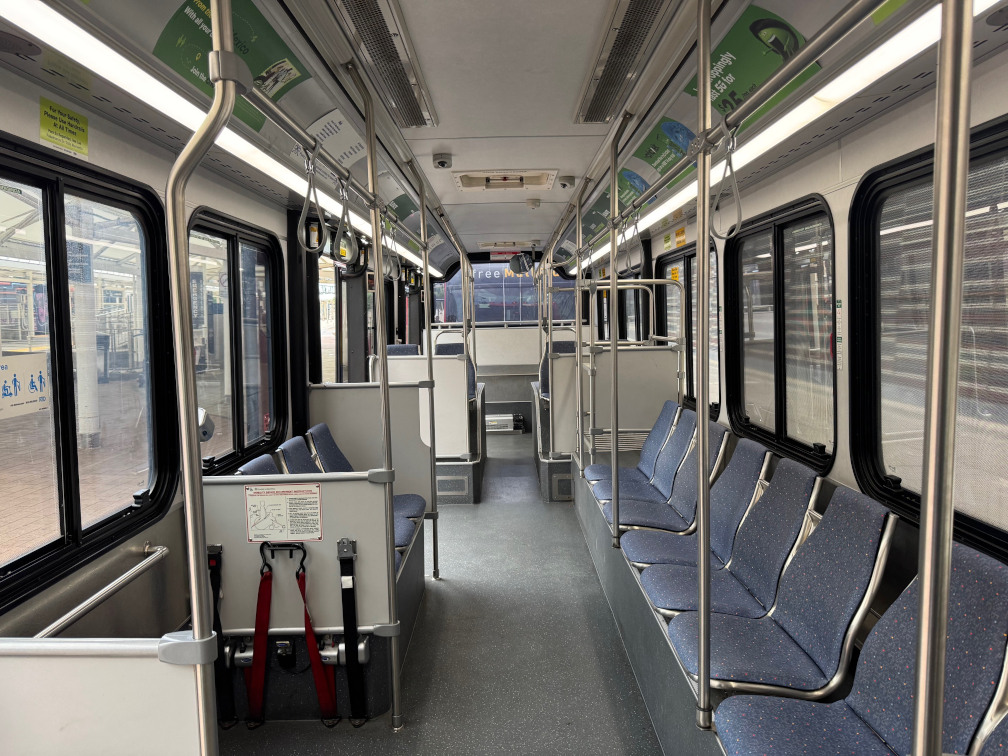
Interior of a BYD K10MR FreeRide bus

Since the service's inception, RTD has used custom-designed right-hand drive buses. This configuration gives operators improved visibility of passengers boarding and alighting from the curb side, as well as pedestrians who often move close to the buses, which travel at speeds up to 12 miles per hour (19 km/h) in the open mall setting. The buses also feature a low-floor design with an open interior with minimal seating (currently 18 seats, out of a capacity of 106), and three doors, enabling near-level boarding and accommodating fast passenger flow both inside the bus and during boarding and alighting.

The first-generation buses, used from 1982 to 1999, were diesel-powered and front-wheel drive. The second-generation "EcoMark" buses, used from 1999 to 2016, were series hybrids with wheel hub motors powered by batteries charged from a 70 horsepower (52 kW), 1.6-liter compressed natural gas engine supplied by Ford. The third-generation BYD K10MR buses, introduced in 2016, are fully battery electric.

== Impact as an urban space ==
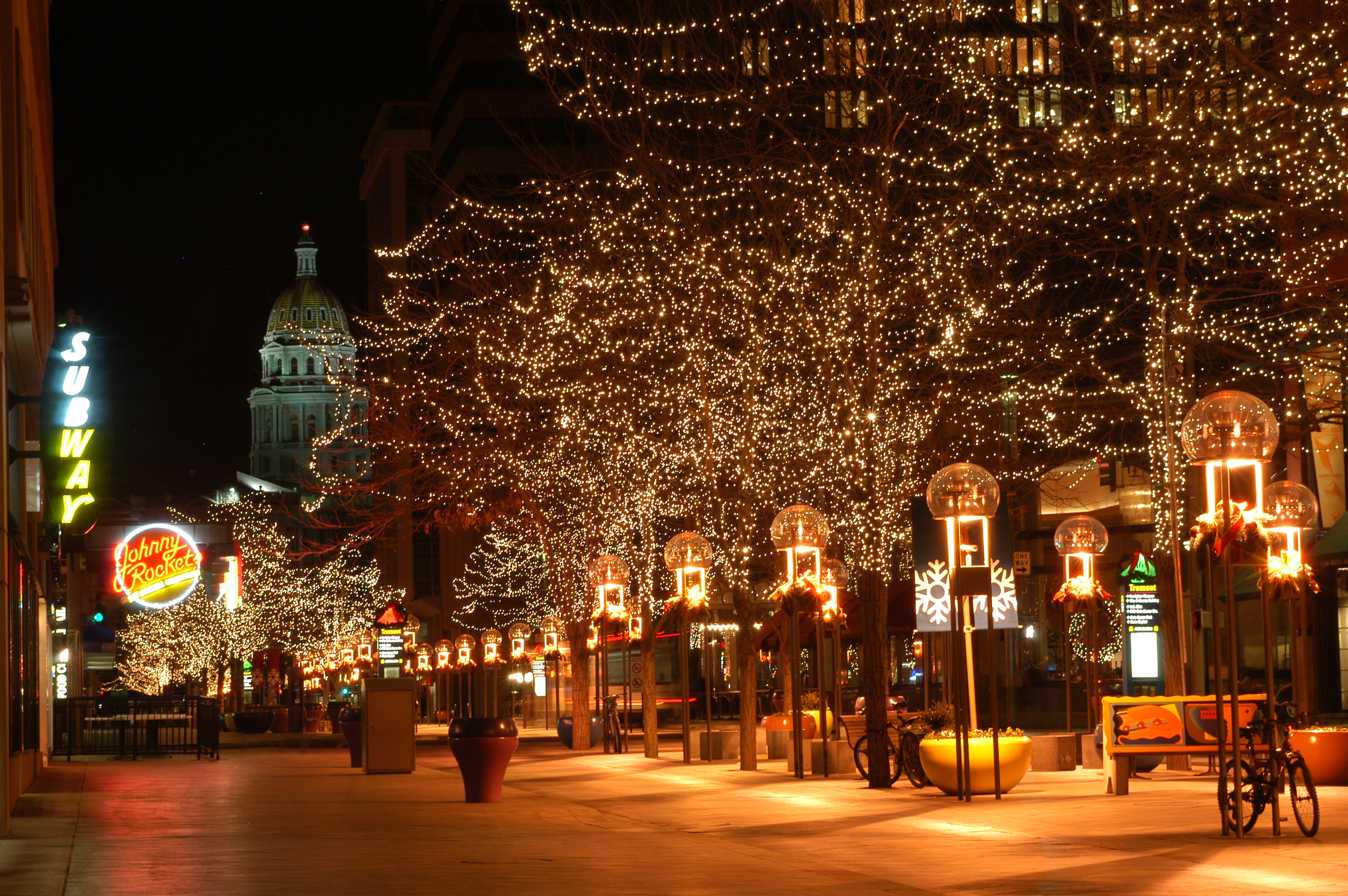
16th Street Mall with Colorado State Capitol in background

The Project for Public Spaces says of the Mall that it "provides the entire downtown with shuttle bus circulation and high quality pedestrian access to Union Station. However, its success as a place has to do with its edge uses, over 300 shops and 50 restaurants that line the Mall with cafés, window displays, and buskers."

In summer 2014, and again in 2015, the Downtown Denver Partnership and Downtown Denver Business Improvement collaborated on several Meet in the Street Sunday events, rerouting the Mall Shuttle to adjacent streets and opening much of the mall to pedestrians and cyclists, and featuring various activities to bring people together.

On May 20th, 2025, Denver City Leaders and Mayor Mike Johnston announced that 90% of a $175.4 million renovation had been completed and the area will drop "Mall" from its moniker and be known as simply "16th Street" and will also be referred to as "The Denver Way", the main street of downtown, it is The Denver Way, by which you can make your way through downtown.
