= RidgeGate Parkway station =

Light rail station in Lone Tree, Colorado

RidgeGate Parkway
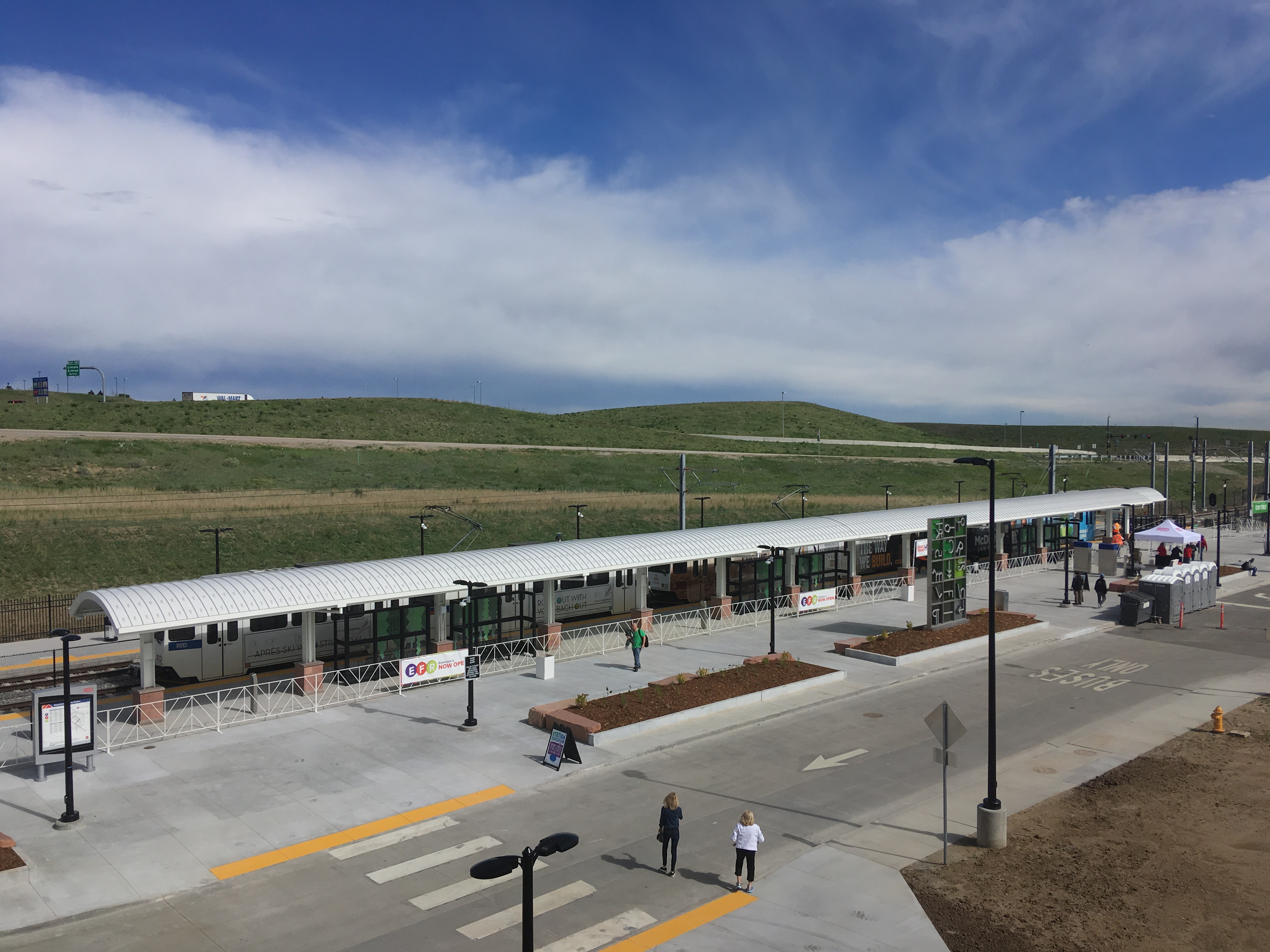
- RidgeGate Parkway station platform, as seen from the station's parking garage in 2019

General information
- Location: 10791 S Havana Street; Lone Tree, Colorado
- Coordinates: 39°31′14″N 104°51′56″W
- Owner: Regional Transportation District
- Line: Southeast Rail Extension
- Platforms: 2 side platforms
- Tracks: 2

Construction
- Structure type: At-grade
- Parking: 1,300 spaces
- Cycle facilities: 8 racks
- Accessible: Yes

History
- Opened: May 17, 2019

Passengers
- 2025: 1,193 (average daily)
- Rank: 32 out of 75

Services
Preceding station	RTD	Following station
Lone Tree City Center toward Union Station	E Line	Terminus
Lone Tree City Center toward Peoria	R Line	Terminus
Former services
Preceding station	RTD	Following station
Lone Tree City Center toward 18th & California	F Line	Terminus
Location

RidgeGate Parkway station is a light rail station in Lone Tree, Colorado. It is operated by the Regional Transportation District (RTD), and was opened on May 17, 2019. It is currently served by the E and R Lines, and is the southern terminus of both lines.

== Station layout ==
1F

Platform Level

Havana Street; parking
Side platform, doors will open on the left
Northbound
← toward Union Station (Lone Tree City Center)
← toward Peoria (Lone Tree City Center)
Northbound
← toward Union Station (Lone Tree City Center)
← toward Peoria (Lone Tree City Center)
Side platform, doors will open on the right
I-25

The station consists of two side platforms located adjacent to the interchange of Interstate 25 and RidgeGate Parkway. It also has a 1,300-stall parking garage and bicycle facilities. As the southernmost station in the RTD rail system, it attracts riders from communities in Denver's southernmost suburbs (such as Castle Rock, Castle Pines, and Parker) and Colorado Springs, who use the station as a gateway to the Denver metro area.

The RidgeGate area was annexed into Lone Tree in 2000 and is planned to anchor a major office and residential development, comprising much of Lone Tree's planned city center.

== History ==
When the station opened on May 17, 2019, it was served by the E, F, and R Lines. Due to the COVID-19 pandemic, the F Line was suspended and the R Line's southern terminus was cut back to Lincoln. The F Line never returned to service and was officially eliminated in RTD's January 2023 service change. R Line service has not been restored on a permanent basis due to low demand south of Lincoln. As such, passengers must transfer there for service to Aurora and Denver International Airport.

As of September 2026, R Line service south of Lincoln has been temporarily restored, returning its southern terminus to RidgeGate Parkway. This configuration will remain through the completion of the Downtown Rail Reconstruction Project, at which point the R Line terminus will return to Lincoln.

== Location ==
RidgeGate Parkway station sits within the planned RidgeGate development, a 3,500-acre mixed-use community developed by Coventry Development Corporation that spans both sides of Interstate 25 south of Lincoln Avenue. At buildout, RidgeGate is projected to house 30,000 residents and 50,000 jobs.

The station's west side contains a shopping center and a hotel. The east side of I-25, where the station is located, began large-scale residential and commercial development in 2020, with transit-oriented development concentrated around the station including market-rate and affordable apartment complexes, senior housing, and retail.

The low ridership that contributed to the R Line's service reduction was attributed in part to the station's development still being in early stages at the time of its opening. Since then, development around the station has accelerated significantly. A 540-unit market-rate apartment building was completed adjacent to the station in 2023. Additional transit-oriented development is planned and under construction as of 2026.

== Public art ==
End of Line is a permanent public art installation located in the station plaza created by Erik Carlson and Erica Carpenter. It was commissioned by RTD and completed in February 2019. RTD received more than 300 proposals that were evaluated by an art selection committee that included members of the Lone Tree Arts Commission, the RTD Board of Directors, and local arts administrators. The commission budget was $150,000. Fabrication and installation were carried out by Junoworks, with glass fabrication by Glas-Pro.

The sculpture, which measures 17 feet 6 inches (5.33 m) tall and 9 feet 6 inches (2.90 m) wide, is constructed from stainless steel and glass with integrated LED lighting. Its icons are arranged in a grid echoing the street plan of the surrounding RidgeGate neighborhood, and draw from livestock brands of historic nearby ranches and the language of computer programming. This is meant to reflect Lone Tree's agrarian past and its modern identity as a technology and business hub. The title carries a double meaning, referencing both the station's role as the terminus of the line and the broader theme of endings and beginnings as the surrounding landscape transforms. In 2020, End of Line was named to the Codaworx Top 100 Projects Award, which recognizes outstanding commissioned artworks from around the world.
