= Littleton–Downtown station =

Light rail station in Littleton, Colorado

Littleton•Downtown
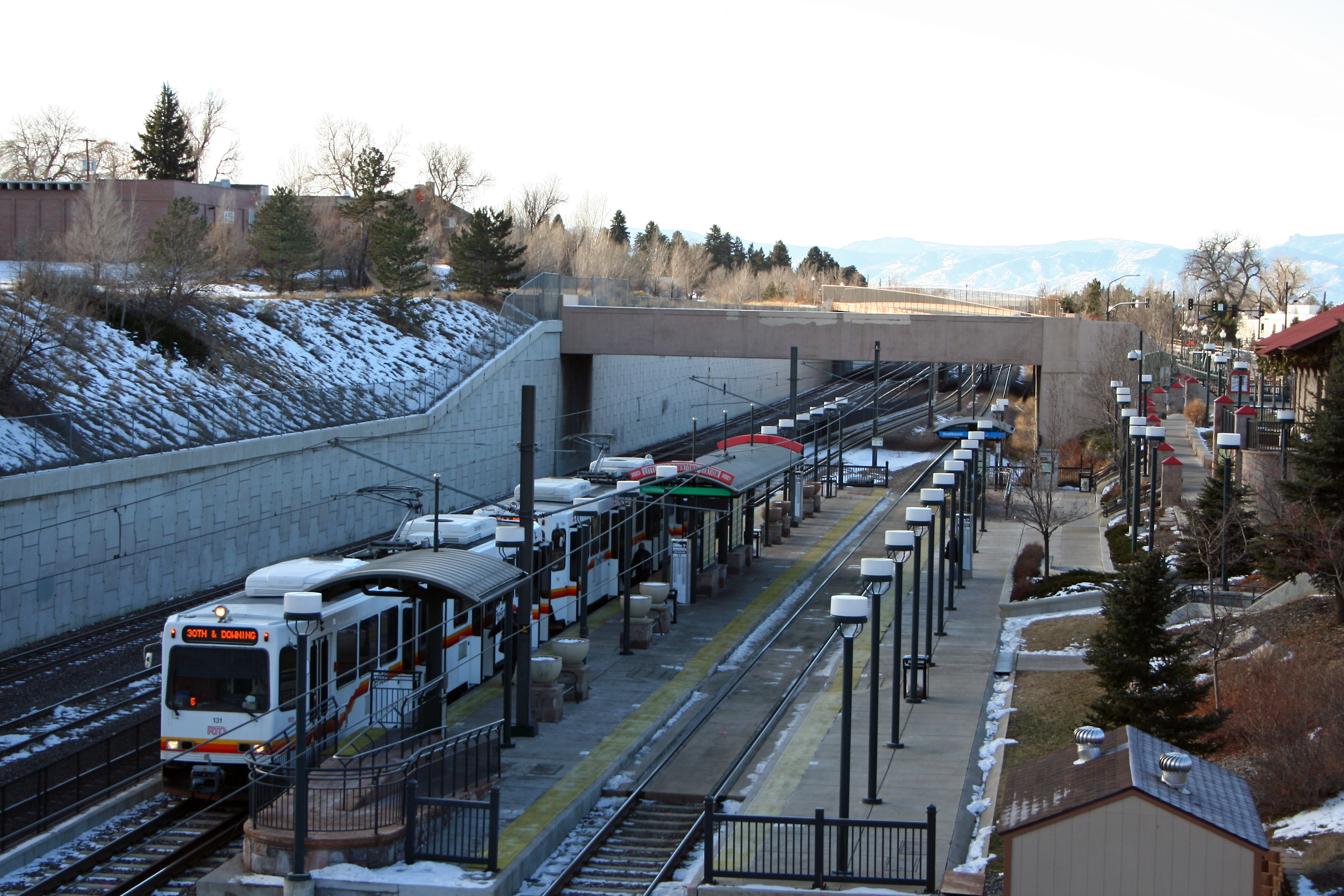
- The Littleton–Downtown station in Littleton, Colorado

General information
- Other names: Littleton•Downtown
- Location: 5777 South Prince Street; Littleton, Colorado
- Coordinates: 39.611993°N 105.014901°W
- Owner: Regional Transportation District
- Line: Southwest Corridor
- Platforms: 1 side platform, 1 island platform
- Tracks: 2
- Connections: RTD Bus: 36, 66, South Jeffco Flexride

Construction
- Structure type: Open cut
- Parking: 361 spaces
- Cycle facilities: 28 racks, 12 lockers
- Accessible: Yes

History
- Opened: January 1, 1872 (Royal Gorge Route); July 14, 2000 (RTD light rail)

Passengers
- 2025: 1,168 (average daily)
- Rank: 33 out of 75

Services
| Preceding station | RTD | Following station |
|---|---|---|
| Oxford–City of Sheridan toward Union Station | C Line | Littleton–Mineral Terminus |
Former services
| Preceding station | Denver and Rio Grande Western Railroad | Following station |
|---|---|---|
| Castle Rock Depot toward Ogden | Royal Gorge Route | Denver Terminus |
| Preceding station | RTD | Following station |
| Oxford–City of Sheridan toward 18th & California/Stout | D Line | Littleton–Mineral Terminus |
Location

Littleton–Downtown station (sometimes styled as Littleton•Downtown) is an RTD light rail station in Littleton, Colorado, United States. Operation as a light rail station began on July 14, 2000, with both bus and light rail run by the Regional Transportation District. The station initially saw service on the C Line and D Line. C Line service was initially permanently discontinued in 2021, but was reinstated in 2026 along with the permanent discontinuation of the D Line.

== History ==
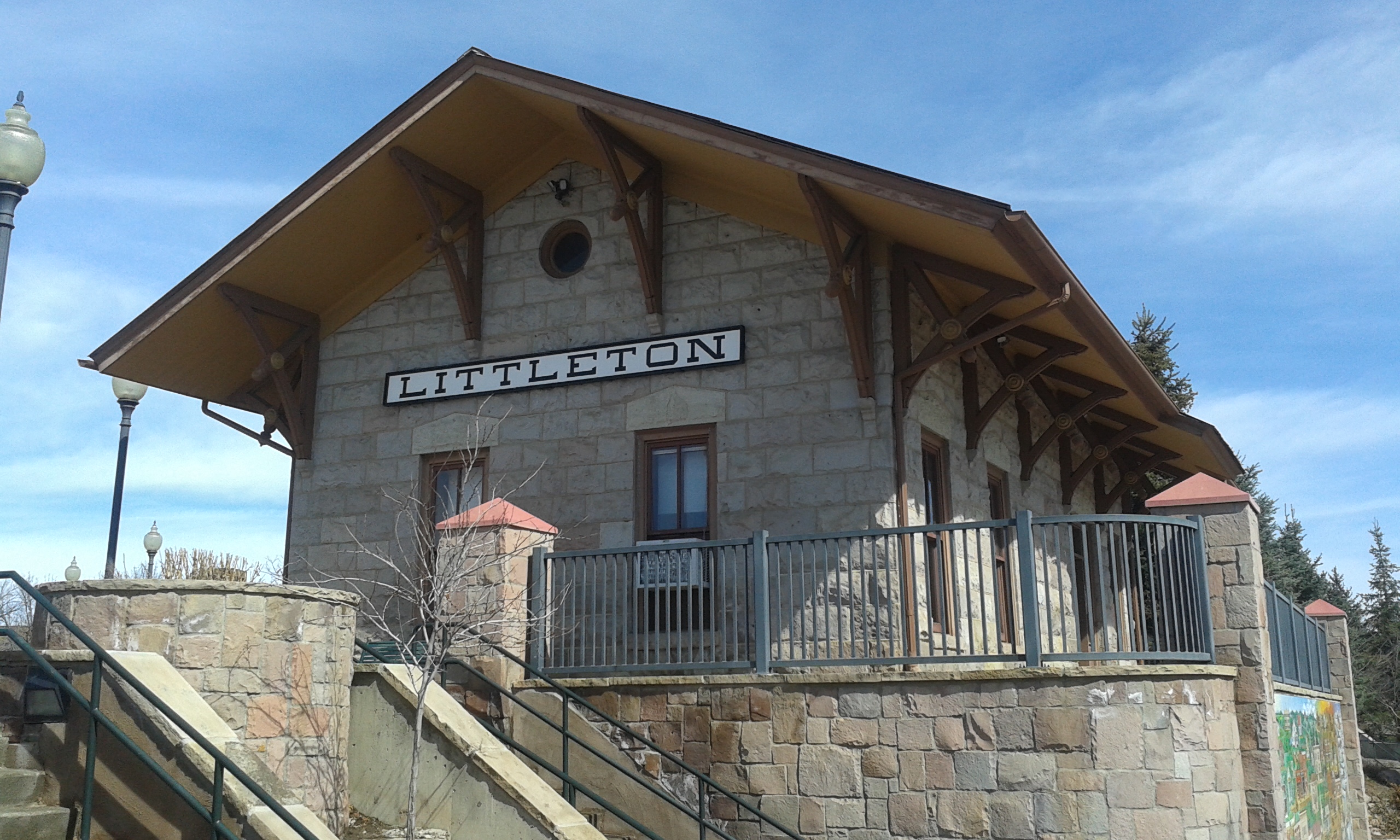
Littleton–Downtown station building as viewed from the station platform. It was originally used as a Denver & Rio Grande Deopt, then as a coffee shop from 2000-2020 and 2022-2024.

=== Denver & Rio Grande Depot ===
Littleton–Downtown station's depot opened on January 1, 1872 as a flag stop on the Denver & Rio Grande Railroad's Royal Gorge Route. A wooden frame was constructed at the stop in 1873, with the stone building that still stands today being built in 1875. Regular scheduled railroad service to the Littleton depot would begin in 1889. A separate baggage room was added in 1906, which was then connected to the main building in 1942. Between the Denver & Rio Grande Railroad, and the adjacent Denver, South Park and Pacific Railroad and Atchison, Topeka and Santa Fe Railway, downtown Littleton saw 24 daily intercity passenger trains at its peak. Passenger service to the depot, and thus the entire city of Littleton, ended in 1967.

The depot was then moved twice: first in 1984, and then again in 1998 to accommodate RTD service. The station depot is historically significant as one of a few remaining examples of small stone Victorian era train depots in Colorado. Additionally, it unique among RTD rail stations as most do not predate RTD passenger rail service. It is also unique as one of only a few RTD stations with a dedicated station building with heating and air conditioning.

==== Coffee shop ====
The station building began use as a coffee shop in 2000, coinciding with the beginning of RTD service to the station. The first coffee shop to occupy the building, Romancing the Bean, closed in 2020 due to the COVID-19 pandemic. In 2022, Nook Coffee began using the building with support from Littleton's City Council, but shut down in March 2024.

=== 2009 BNSF derailment ===
On January 16, 2009, a southbound BNSF freight train consisting of three locomotives and 68 train cars derailed on the freight tracks adjacent to the station. Three of the train cars were punctured, releasing roughly 100 US gallons (380 L) of liquid sulfur onto the tracks. The sulfur did not pose a health risk to the surrounding area but did release a strong "rotten egg" odor in the area. Light rail service to the station was suspended and replaced with bus shuttle to Englewood station.

== Station layout ==
1F
South Prince Street; bus bays; parking
B1

Platform Level

Colorado Joint Line
Northbound
← toward Union Station (Oxford-City of Sheridan)
Island platform, northbound only; doors will open on the left
Southbound
toward Littleton-Mineral (Terminus) →
Side platform, southbound only; doors will open on the right

Littleton–Downtown station has two platforms, one side platform for southbound service and an island platform for northbound service. The station platform is located in the open cut Colorado Joint Line, necessitating the use of stairs or a ramp to access it. The station's park-and-ride, depot, and bus loop are located at street level and are accessible via South Prince Street. Additionally, the station is accessible to pedestrians and bicycles through the Little's Creek Trail.

== Location ==
Littleton–Downtown station is located on the western edge of Downtown Littleton, with the Sterne park neighborhood directly to the south and east. The Littleton Main Street Historic District is kitty-corner to the station's northwest, which also includes the Town Hall Arts Center. The Geneva Home is then a few blocks further north. Across the Colorado Joint Line right of way to the east of the station is the Colorado Center for the Blind. Several blocks to the east are the Knight-Wood House and Littleton Public Schools headquarters. The Arapahoe Community College campus is located directly to the southeast of the station, with college's Art and Design Center facing the station.

=== Transit oriented development ===
Three developments have been constructed in the area around Littleton–Downtown station in cooperation with RTD. The closest to the station and largest of these is the Vita apartment complex, which was completed in 2017 containing 11,000 square feet of retail and 159 apartment units marketed as for ages 55 and up. The building is located next to the Colorado Center for the Blind. Nearby on Littleton Boulevard is the first transit oriented development around Littleton–Downtown station, the Littleton Station apartments. It consists of 37 residential units and 10,000 square feet of office space, having been opened in 2008. The furthest development from the station itself, roughly half a mile away, is the Nevada Place condominiums, which consist of 31 strictly residential units. Completed in 2011, they are located to the northeast of the station.

== Services ==
Littleton–Downtown station is served by the C Line, which runs from Littleton to LoDo via Sheridan, Englewood, Overland, Baker, Lincoln Park, and Auraria. It is the first station on the C Line northbound from Littleton–Mineral and the tenth station on the C Line south from Denver Union Station, situated between Oxford-City of Sheridan to the north and Littleton-Mineral to the south. C Line trains serve Littleton–Downtown station from 4:00 a.m. to 12:30 a.m. Monday through Thursday, however service lasts until 1:00 a.m. on Sundays and holidays, and until 2:00 a.m. on Fridays and Saturdays. During most hours of the day, the C Line serves Littleton–Downtown station every 15 minutes, however headways become longer early in the morning and late at night. The station is approximately 25 minutes from Union Station in downtown Denver and three minutes from Littleton–Mineral station.

The station is also served by four RTD bus routes. Route 30 serves Littleton–Downtown every 15 minutes, running north from the station along Federal Boulevard to the Colfax and Federal bus hub. Route 36 travels on a 60 minute headway between the same termini as Route 29, however it runs primarily via Lowell Boulevard instead of Federal. Route 59 runs west from the station to West Coal Mine Avenue, however it terminates at Southwest Plaza on Sundays. Finally, Route 66 stops at Littleton–Downtown station in route between Arapahoe Community College and Arapahoe at Village Center station on an hourly frequency.

RTD's on demand transit service, branded as FlexRide, also serves Littleton–Downtown station. The station is included in the South Jeffco service area, with on demand shuttles bookable to other places within that service area from 5:30 a.m. to 7:00 p.m. Monday through Friday and 8:00 a.m. to 10 p.m. on Saturdays. FlexRide does not serve the station on Sundays.

== Public art ==
Littleton–Downtown station features a mural titled Seasons of Littleton. The art piece was created by Michelle Lamb and installed in 2000. At 40 feet wide and seven feet tall, the mural had to be installed on eight metal panels which are attached to the western platform wall of the station. The painting was inspired by the Robert McQuarie book Settlement to Centennial as well as photos from the Littleton Historical Museum. The mural depicts 50 historical structures, most of which are located near the station.
