= Oxford–City of Sheridan station =

Light rail station in Englewood, Colorado

Oxford•City of Sheridan
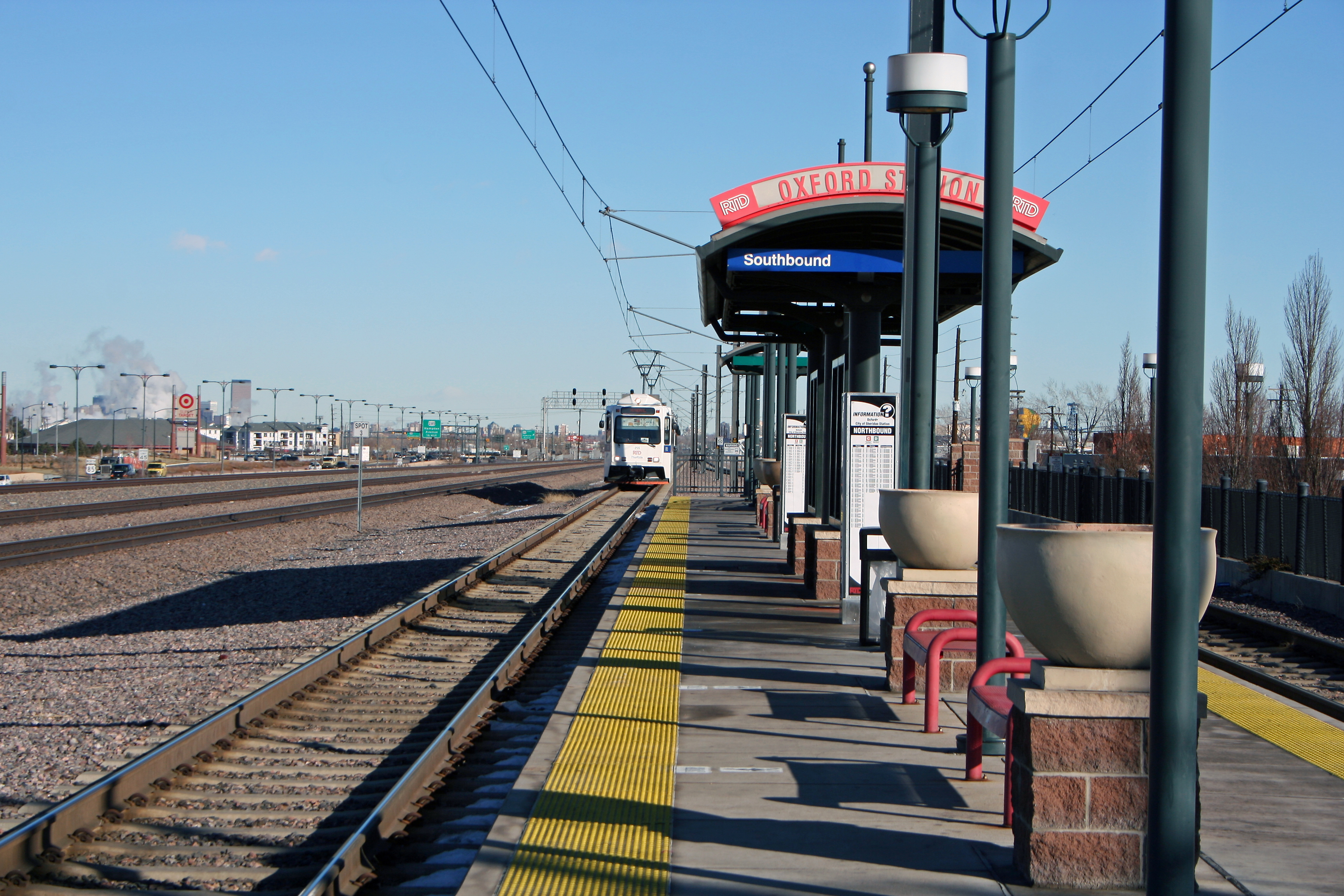
- Oxford–City of Sheridan station in Sheridan, Colorado.

General information
- Other names: Oxford•City of Sheridan
- Location: 4101 Windermere Street; Sheridan, Colorado
- Coordinates: 39.6429°N 105.004849°W
- Owner: Regional Transportation District
- Line: Southwest Corridor
- Platforms: 1 island platform
- Tracks: 2
- Connections: RTD Bus: 51

Construction
- Structure type: At-grade
- Accessible: Yes

History
- Opened: July 14, 2000

Passengers
- 2025: 454 (average daily)
- Rank: 61 out of 75

Services
Preceding station	RTD	Following station
Englewood toward Union Station	C Line	Littleton–Downtown toward Littleton–Mineral
Former services
Preceding station	RTD	Following station
Englewood toward 18th & California/Stout	D Line	Littleton–Downtown toward Littleton–Mineral
Location

Oxford–City of Sheridan station (sometimes styled as Oxford•City of Sheridan) is an island platformed RTD light rail station on the boundary of Sheridan and Englewood, Colorado, United States. Operating as part of the C Line, the station was opened on July 14, 2000, and is operated by the Regional Transportation District. Rare for a suburban RTD station, there is no parking at Oxford-City of Sheridan.

== Station layout ==
1F

Platform Level

South Windermere Street; bus bays
Northbound
← toward Union Station (Englewood)
Island platform, doors will open on the left
Southbound
toward Littleton-Mineral (Littleton-Downtown) →
Colorado Joint Line
US 85 / Santa Fe Drive
