= Evans station (RTD) =

Light rail station in Denver, Colorado

Evans
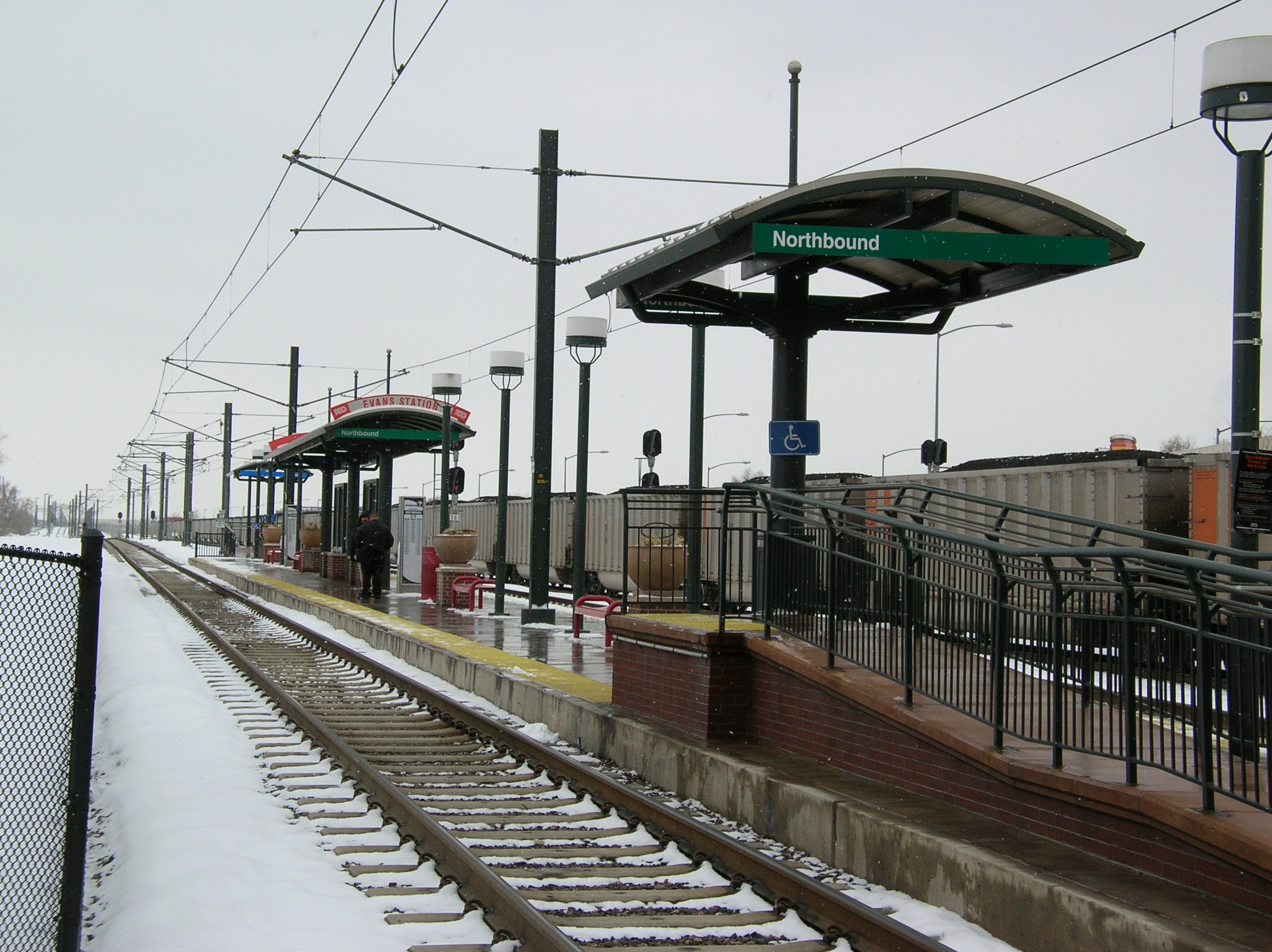
- Evans station platform

General information
- Location: 2150 South Delaware Street; Denver, Colorado
- Coordinates: 39.67765°N 104.992846°W
- Owner: Regional Transportation District
- Line: Southwest Corridor
- Platforms: 1 island platform
- Tracks: 2
- Connections: RTD Bus: 21, 22

Construction
- Structure type: At-grade
- Parking: 99 spaces
- Cycle facilities: 10 racks, 8 lockers
- Accessible: Yes

History
- Opened: July 14, 2000

Passengers
- 2025: 623 (average daily)
- Rank: 50 out of 75

Services
| Preceding station | RTD | Following station |
|---|---|---|
| I-25 & Broadway toward Union Station | C Line | Englewood toward Littleton–Mineral |
Former services
| Preceding station | RTD | Following station |
|---|---|---|
| I-25 & Broadway toward 18th & California/Stout | D Line | Englewood toward Littleton–Mineral |
Location

Evans station is an island platformed RTD light rail station in Denver, Colorado, United States. Operating as part of the C Line, the station was opened on July 14, 2000, and is operated by the Regional Transportation District. It is the northernmost station served exclusively by the C Line. Evans features a public art installation entitled People Hereabouts, created by Jack Unruh of the Overland Neighborhood Association in Denver, and dedicated in 2000.

== Station layout ==
1F

Platform Level

South Delaware Street; bus bays; parking
Northbound
← toward Union Station (I-25 & Broadway)
Island platform, doors will open on the left
Southbound
toward Littleton-Mineral (Englewood) →
Colorado Joint Line
US 85 / Santa Fe Drive

Evans station is located in the Overland neighborhood, four blocks west of South Broadway. There is no pedestrian bridge crossing US 85 at the station. Passengers wishing to cross the freeway must either use the sidewalks along West Evans Avenue - intersecting the freeway's entrance and exit ramps - or walk two blocks north to use a pedestrian bridge crossing at West Jewell Avenue.
