= The River Mile =

Future master planned community in Denver, Colorado

- Location within Colorado
- Country: United States
- State: Colorado
- County: Denver
- Named for: South Platte River

Area
  - Total: 62 acres (25 ha)
- Elevation: 5,280 ft (1,610 m)
- Time zone: UTC−07:00 (MST)
  - Summer (DST): UTC−06:00 (MDT)

The River Mile is a planned 62-acre (250,000 m^{2}) master-planned, mixed-use community in Denver, Colorado. The site is currently home to Elitch Gardens Theme Park, an amusement park and water park dating back to its current location in 1995. The development gets its name from the adjacent South Platte River, of which the development runs about 1 mile (1.6 km) along the river. The project largely follows a New Urbanist design, emphasizing the "human-scale" development over auto-centric development. The project would be complimented by more mixed-use redevelopments occurring around the Ball Arena, Mile High Stadium, and Auraria Campus, all of which emphasize similar goals as The River Mile.

== History ==
In March 2018, the owners of Elitch Gardens, Revesco, revealed the redevelopment plan for the theme park. Elitch Gardens was considered to be aging and in need of relocation, and considered to be a "donut hole" surrounded by the denser center of the city. The property was unique for an urban setting as it was entirely owned by one company, making it easy for redevelopment. The project was said to take 25 years to build fully.

On December 17, 2018, Denver City Council approved the redevelopment. The City Council had to create new zoning types for the development in order to allow for the many high-rises and skyscrapers within the project. Revesco agreed to set aside 15% of units for affordable housing. The new zoning required any building over five stories to include affordable housing. Additionally, 12% of the land is required to be public parks and open space, including a possible recreation center. The new zoning also includes parking maximums and bicycle parking minimums.

The project is to be built in multiple phases, with each neighborhood being built one at a time. Complete restoration of the river is supposed to conclude by the end of 2024. The first neighborhood, Headwater, is to be completed in 2026–2027. As of 2024, Elitch Gardens is still operating for the season, thus no construction has started yet.

In June 2025, Kroenke Sports and Entertainment acquired Revesco's interest in the River Mile development, leaving the future of the River Mile in KSE's hands. KSE said that Elitch Gardens will continue to operate in its current site, stating that they intend to keep it that way and “better than ever.” Despite the claims that Headwater will be completed by 2027, construction has not begun. Despite this, the owners still plan to eventually move Elitch Gardens to another location.

== Design ==
The River Mile emphasizes that it will not be a car dependent neighborhood, but instead will be a walkable, cyclable, transit-oriented, sustainable, and easily accessible to Downtown Denver and various attractions in the area. The South Platte River is heavily emphasized as a focal point of the development. Greenery is also a core component of the development, with plentiful trees and green space throughout. Building design is to ensure that the ground gets lots of sunlight and fresh air. The River Mile is broken down into 47% office space (6.65M sq ft), 41% residential (5.85M sq ft), 5.5% hotel (790k sq ft), 3.5% retail (520k sq ft), 2.5% community/institutional (350k sq ft), and 0.5% Meow Wolf. Overall, the development is supposed to house about 15,000 residents.

=== Neighborhoods ===
The River Mile is divided into three neighborhoods, each built in each successive phase of development. The developer claims that each neighborhood is to be distinct from each other with their own relationship to the river. However, each neighborhood is to utilize mixed-used design, so residences, workplaces, retail, dining, and nature are all aspects included in each neighborhood.

==== Headwater ====
Headwater is to be the first neighborhood to be built within the development and is the northernmost part of the development. The utilization of this neighborhood is broken down into 43% office space (2.5M sq ft), 42% residential (2.5M sq ft), 3% hotel (200k sq ft), 7% retail (400k sq ft), and 5% community/institutional (300k sq ft). Along the riverbank, Headwater will include a large lawn space and a public plaza. A pedestrian bridge will connect the neighborhood to Fishback Park across the river. The central transit plaza adjacent to the light rail station will be located at the border of the Headwater neighborhood and The Bend neighborhood.

==== The Bend ====
The Bend is the central part of The River Mile. This neighborhood will include a central plaza with pocket parks, major residential development alongside the river, a community center, and the shared transit plaza with Headwater.

==== The Banks ====
The Banks is the southernmost neighborhood, and is much smaller and very narrow than Headwater or The Bend. Buildings here will be lower scale, and will focus on riverfront residential and retail. Additionally, the Meow Wolf art exhibit, which opened in 2021, will be incorporated into The River Mile as the southernmost structure.

== Infrastructure ==
=== Infrastructure ===
Street design is to prioritize pedestrians, cyclists, and transit users first, and cars second. Streets will include public transportation lanes, dedicated bike lanes, wide sidewalks, and narrow roadways. Every street is supposed to be designed differently, with some streets being pedestrian only. An abundance of greenery, colorful plantings, and textural elements such as permeable pavers will be included in street design. Four new bridges are to be constructed across the river as well.

Art, culture, and education are points highlighted by the developer. A new elementary school will be built in the development. Public art will be scattered throughout the development.

== Transportation ==
The River Mile would be bordered by two light rail stations, the Ball Arena-Elitch Gardens station and Empower Field at Mile High station.

Additionally, The River Mile will have an autonomous shuttle circulating throughout the development, utilizing the dedicated transportation lanes. A transit plaza adjacent to the Ball Arena-Elitch Gardens station will include a new bridge connecting the development to the Ball Arena, as well as stops for the shuttle.

== South Platte River ==
As a focal point of the development, the South Platte River is to be integrated into the development in order to reconnect the river with the city. The developer plans on investing $100 million into revitalizing the one mile of river, including the instream, banks, and riparian habitat. Plans are to dredge six to eight feet of sand to deepen the river and narrow the river channel to reduce flood risk. Additionally, invasive species will be removed and replaced with native plants. Reintroduction of trout to the section of the river is also in the plan, with fish species that have been planned to be reintroduced include fathead minnow, brown trout, creek chub, longnose sucker, smallmouth bass, white sucker, and rainbow trout. The redesign of the river is meant to handle 100-year flood events.

The river will have lots of new access points, parks, recreational opportunities, and riverfront plazas and trails. New access points include paths, stone steps, and rocky outcroppings that lead directly into the river. ADA-accessible beach access is included. New lawn spaces with plentiful seating are included. The dam and whitewater area at nearby Confluence Park will be relocated to turn it into a whitewater wave recreational feature. Other recreational activities include paddleboarding, kayaking, canoeing, fishing, amongst others. The existing trails on the west side are to be enhanced, while all new trails will be built on the east side of the river, which will include both a pedestrian and bike lane.

== See also ==
- Elitch Gardens Theme Park
