= Ball Arena–Elitch Gardens station =

Light rail station in Denver, Colorado

Ball Arena•Elitch Gardens
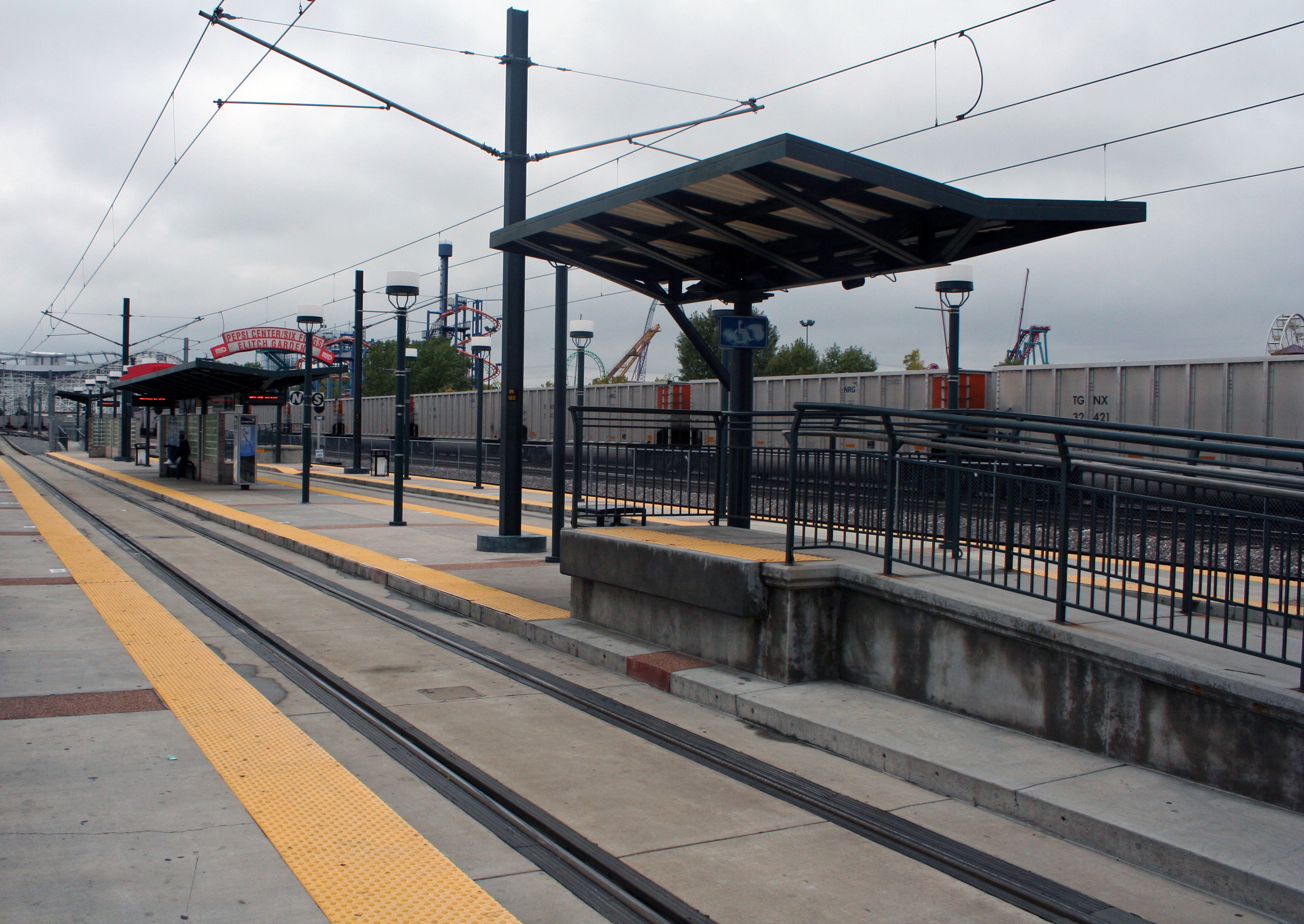
- An empty coal train passes by Ball Arena–Elitch Gardens station on adjacent tracks

General information
- Other names: Ball Arena•Elitch Gardens
- Location: 1700 Ninth Street; Denver, Colorado
- Coordinates: 39.748668°N 105.009643°W
- Owner: Regional Transportation District
- Line: Central Platte Valley
- Platforms: 2 island platforms, 1 side platform
- Tracks: 3

Construction
- Structure type: At-grade
- Accessible: Yes

History
- Opened: April 5, 2002
- Former names: Pepsi Center/Six Flags Elitch Gardens

Passengers
- 2025: 974 (average daily)
- Rank: 37 out of 75

Services
Preceding station	RTD	Following station
Union Station Terminus	C Line	Empower Field at Mile High toward Littleton–Mineral
Union Station Terminus	E Line	Empower Field at Mile High toward RidgeGate Parkway
Union Station Terminus	W Line	Empower Field at Mile High toward JeffCo Gov't Cntr•Golden
Location

Ball Arena–Elitch Gardens (sometimes stylized as Ball Arena•Elitch Gardens) is an at-grade light rail station on the C, E, and W lines of the RTD Rail system. It is located near the intersection of 9th Street and Chopper Circle in Denver, Colorado, near Ball Arena and Elitch Gardens Theme Park, after which the station is named.

== Station layout ==
2F
Pedestrian bridge
1F

Platform Level

Ball Arena
Side platform, doors will open on both sides
Inbound
← toward Union Station (Terminus)
Island platform, doors will open on both sides
Outbound
toward Littleton-Mineral (Empower Field at Mile High) →
toward RidgeGate Parkway (Empower Field at Mile High) →
toward Jeffco Government Center-Golden (Empower Field at Mile High) →
Island platform, doors will open on the left or both sides
Outbound
(Special Events)
toward Littleton-Mineral (Empower Field at Mile High) →
toward RidgeGate Parkway (Empower Field at Mile High) →
toward Jeffco Government Center-Golden (Empower Field at Mile High) →
Elitch Gardens

The station opened on April 5, 2002, as part of the Regional Transportation District's (RTD) Central Platte Valley Light Rail Line project. It was previously known as Pepsi Center–Six Flags Elitch Gardens. The basketball and hockey arena was renamed in 2020 and Six Flags sold Elitch Gardens in 2007.

Ball Arena can be accessed immediately southeast of the station. Access to Elitch Gardens, located northwest of the station, is via a pedestrian bridge over the station and the adjacent Colorado Joint Line. The second outbound track is seldom used outside of events at Ball Arena.
