= Englewood station (RTD) =

Light rail station in Englewood, Colorado

Englewood
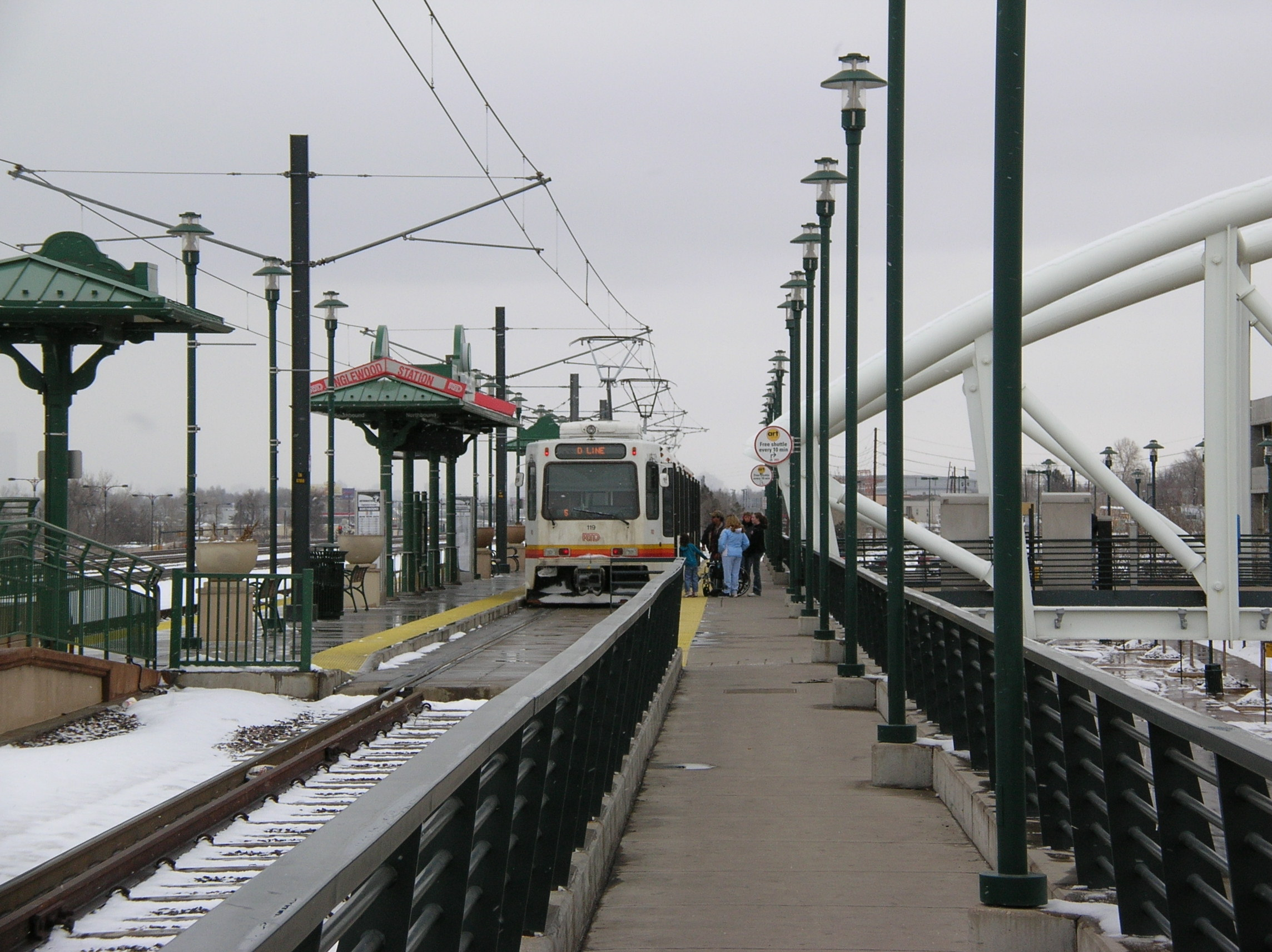
- Englewood station platform

General information
- Location: 899 West Floyd Avenue; Englewood, Colorado
- Coordinates: 39.655611°N 104.99994°W
- Owner: Regional Transportation District
- Line: Southwest Corridor
- Platforms: 1 island platform, 1 side platform
- Tracks: 2
- Connections: RTD Bus: 0, 0B, 12, 35, 51, Englewood Trolley

Construction
- Structure type: Embankment
- Parking: 910 spaces
- Cycle facilities: 24 racks, 32 lockers
- Accessible: Yes

History
- Opened: July 14, 2000

Passengers
- 2025: 1,365 (average daily)
- Rank: 26 out of 75

Services
Preceding station	RTD	Following station
Evans toward Union Station	C Line	Oxford–City of Sheridan toward Littleton–Mineral
Former services
Preceding station	RTD	Following station
Evans toward 18th & California/Stout	D Line	Oxford–City of Sheridan toward Littleton–Mineral
Location

Englewood station is an RTD light rail station in Englewood, Colorado, United States. Operating as part of the C Line, the station was opened on July 14, 2000, and is operated by the Regional Transportation District.

== Station layout ==
2F

Platform Level

Pedestrian bridges to Englewood Civic Center, bus bays, and parking
Side platform, northbound only; doors will open on the right
Northbound
← toward Union Station (Evans)
Island platform, southbound only; doors will open on the left
Southbound
toward Littleton-Mineral (Oxford-City of Sheridan) →
1F
Bus bays; pedestrian walkways to Englewood Civic Center and parking
Colorado Joint Line
US 85 / Santa Fe Drive

Englewood station sits at the interchange between two suburban freeways, US 85 and US 285. The station is adjacent to the Englewood Civic Center, site of the former Cinderella City Mall. A pedestrian bridge connects the platform level directly with the building, which contains Englewood's city hall, public library, municipal courthouse, and other city offices. A second bridge crosses directly over the bus bays and provides ramp and stairwell access down to them. There is no access to the station from west of US 85 or south of US 285.
