= Auraria West station =

Light rail station in Denver, Colorado

Auraria West
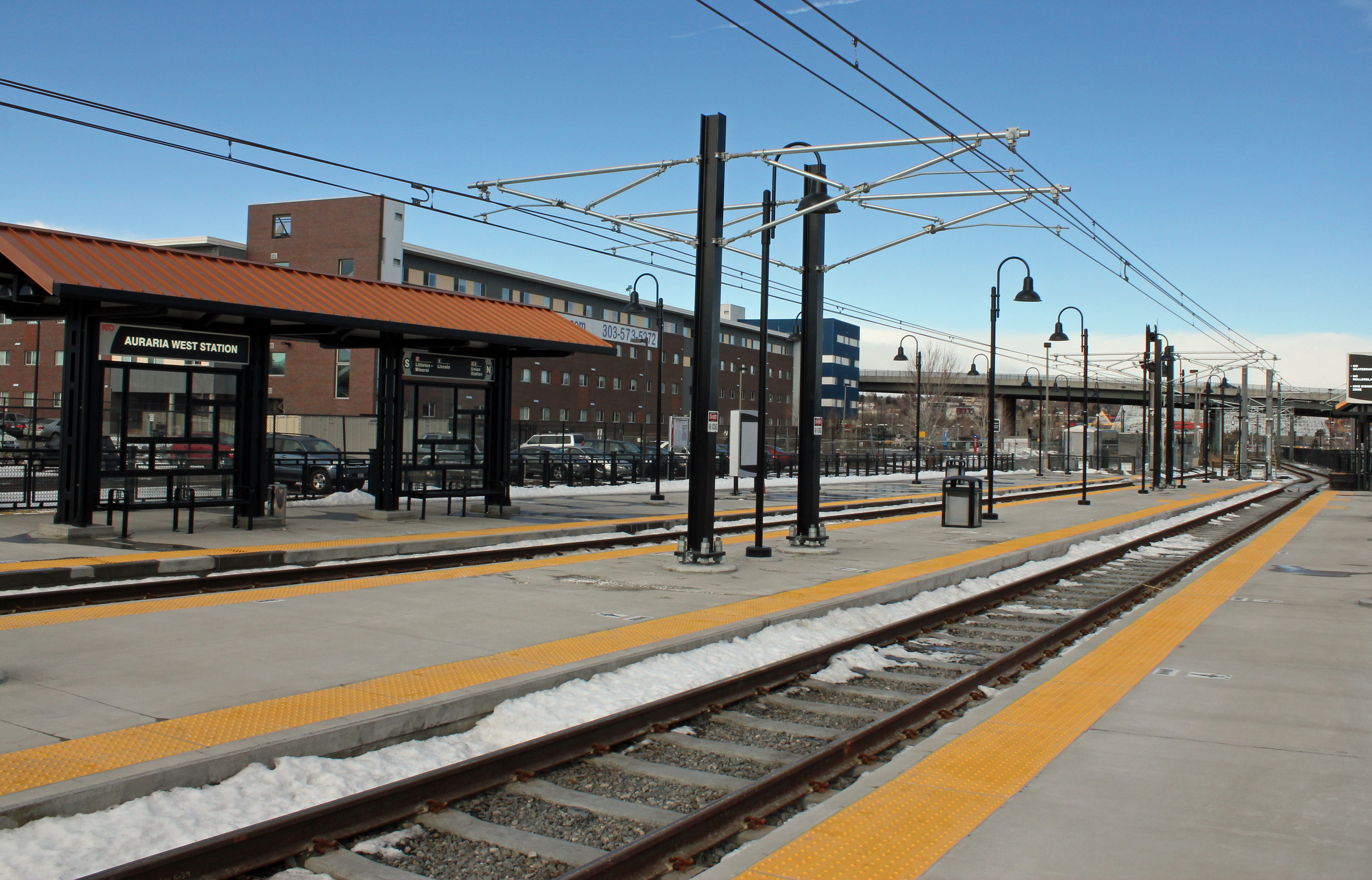
- Auraria West light rail station, 2011

General information
- Location: 1250 Fifth Street; Denver, Colorado
- Coordinates: 39.741367°N 105.010693°W
- Owner: Regional Transportation District
- Line: Central Platte Valley
- Platforms: 2 side platforms, 1 island platform
- Tracks: 2

Construction
- Structure type: At-grade
- Accessible: Yes

History
- Opened: April 5, 2002
- Rebuilt: 2011

Passengers
- 2025: 2,524 (average daily)
- Rank: 7 out of 75

Services
Preceding station	RTD	Following station
Empower Field at Mile High toward Union Station	C Line	10th & Osage toward Littleton–Mineral
Empower Field at Mile High toward Union Station	E Line	10th & Osage toward RidgeGate Parkway
Empower Field at Mile High toward Union Station	W Line	Decatur–Federal toward JeffCo Gov't Cntr•Golden
Location

Auraria West station is an RTD light rail station in Denver, Colorado. Operating as part of the C, E and W lines, the station opened on April 5, 2002, and is operated by the Regional Transportation District. It primarily serves the adjacent Auraria academic campus, home to Metropolitan State University of Denver, the Community College of Denver, and the University of Colorado Denver. It is the last transfer point for passengers travelling outbound to Lakewood and Golden on the W Line.

== Station layout ==
1F

Platform Level

5th Street; Auraria Campus
Side platform, doors will open on both sides
Inbound
← toward Union Station (Empower Field at Mile High)
Island platform, doors will open on both sides
Outbound
toward Littleton-Mineral (10th & Osage) →
toward RidgeGate Parkway (10th & Osage) →
toward Jeffco Government Center-Golden (Decatur-Federal) →
Side platform, doors will open on both sides

The station is a half mile west of Colfax at Auraria station, which also serves the Auraria campus. The original Auraria West station closed on July 23, 2011 in order to accommodate the construction of the W Line; the relocated Auraria West station opened on October 31, 2011, near Fifth and Walnut on a north–south alignment near the Consolidated Main Line tracks. The W Line diverges from the C and E Lines at a partial wye immediately south of the station. There are no bus connections from this station.

The station is less than 1,000 feet southeast of Empower Field at Mile High station. During Denver Broncos gamedays and other events at Empower Field at Mile High, Auraria West is often closed. When closed, passengers wishing to use this station must board at Empower Field at Mile High, where foot traffic and ticket checks are consolidated.
