= Sheridan School District =

Sheridan School District can refer to:

- Sheridan School District (Arkansas)
- Sheridan School District (Colorado)
- Sheridan School District (Oregon)
