= C Line (RTD) =

Light rail line in the Denver metropolitan area

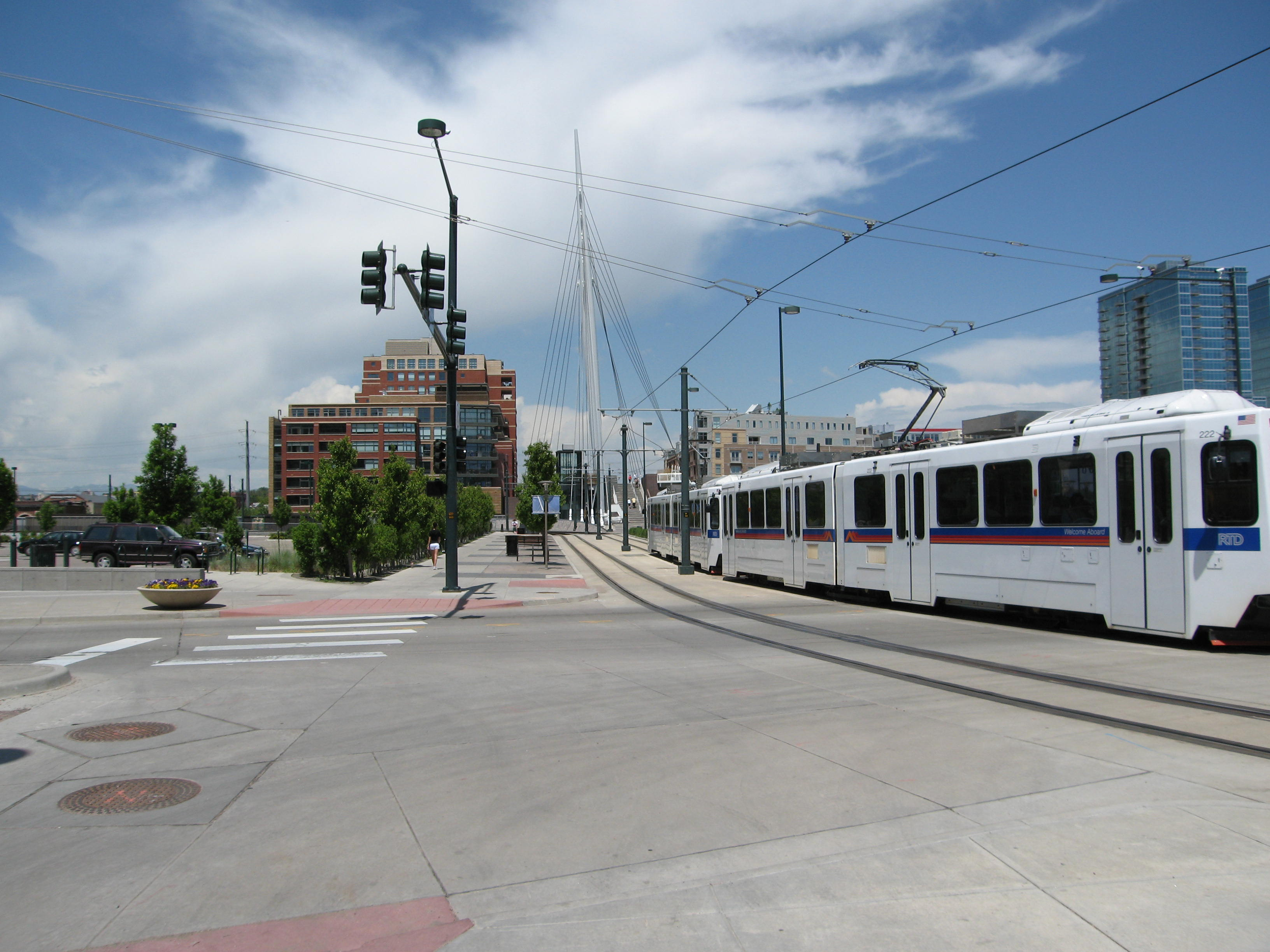
- A C Line train near Union Station

Overview
- Other name: Southwest Line
- Owner: Regional Transportation District
- Locale: Denver metropolitan area
- Termini: Union Station; Littleton–Mineral
- Stations: 12

Service
- Type: Light rail
- System: RTD Rail
- Operator: Regional Transportation District
- Rolling stock: Siemens SD100 & SD160

History
- Opened: April 5, 2002
- Closed: January 10, 2021
- Reopened: June 7, 2026

Technical
- Track gauge: 4 ft 8 1/2 in (1,435 mm) standard gauge
- Electrification: Overhead line, 750 V DC
Route map
C Line highlighted in orange

The C Line is a Regional Transportation District (RTD) light rail line that serves stations in Denver, Englewood, Sheridan, and Littleton, Colorado. The line began service on April 5, 2002, coinciding with the opening of the Central Platte Valley Spur along the Southwest Line. It is colored orange on system maps.

The line did not operate between 2021 and 2026, when it was suspended as a result of the COVID-19 pandemic and then restored as a part of two separate RTD service changes which re-configured service on the Southwest Line.

== Route ==
The C Line's northern terminus is at Union Station in downtown Denver, shared with the E and W Lines. South of Auraria West station, the W Line diverges toward Golden while the H Line joins from the downtown loop. The three lines travel together to I-25 & Broadway station. Immediately south of the station, the E and H lines depart to the southeast alongside Interstate 25, while the C Line continues southwest. It parallels U.S. Route 85 and the Colorado Joint Line to its southern terminus at Littleton-Mineral station.

The five stations comprising the Southwest Corridor - from Evans station to Littleton-Mineral - are exclusive to the C Line.

== History ==
When it opened in 2002, C Line trains operated seven days a week but ran to Littleton–Mineral station only during peak hours and sporting events. At all other times, C Line service operated to between Union Station and I-25 & Broadway, with service to Littleton via the D Line. C Line trains would begin operating the full length of the line in 2003.

When the Southeast Corridor was opened in 2006, weekend C Line service was discontinued except for certain sporting events. Capacity between 10th & Osage station and Union Station was replaced by the E Line.

In 2009, the mid-day service pattern between Union Station and I-25/Broadway was resumed and evening service discontinued. Midday weekday service was discontinued in 2012 and was reinstated in 2014. When suspended, the route was served by the D and E Lines, with a transfer at I-25 & Broadway.

=== Suspension from service (2021-2026) ===
RTD suspended the C Line as a result of the COVID-19 pandemic in its January 2021 service change. The line was officially eliminated in RTD's January 2023 service change. However, due to the Downtown Rail Reconstruction Project, the D Line's northern terminus was diverted to Union Station in the summers of 2024 and 2025, following the route of the C Line but retaining the D Line designation. In June 2026, the D Line was instead suspended - rather than diverted - following resumption of construction. As a result, the C Line designation was temporarily revived for trains using the Southwest Corridor to Union Station. This temporary service pattern became permanent in RTD's September 2026 service change, restoring the C Line and eliminating the D Line from service.

=== Planned extension to Highlands Ranch ===
FasTracks provisions for a new southern terminus at C-470 and Kendrick Castillo Way in Highlands Ranch. This extension will add 2.5 mi (4.02 km) to the C Line, and feature a 1,000-space park-and-ride garage. An environmental evaluation for the station was completed in 2010. Plans for the design of this station were made along with the environmental evaluation; however, the project has not received funding and there is no timeline for the station's construction. Additionally, the 2010 evaluation suggested an intermediate station at C-470 and South Erickson Boulevard, which was not a part of the original FasTracks plan.

FasTracks also provisions for the addition of an infill station at West Bates Avenue in Englewood. No progress on the station has been made since FasTracks' approval in 2004 and as with the Highlands Ranch extension, there is no timeline for the construction of the station.

== Stations ==
Station	Municipality	Opening date	Connections & notes
Union Station	Denver	April 5, 2002	16th Street FreeRide, MetroRide, LYNX, 0, 9, 10, 15, 19, 20, 120X, LD1, LX2, FF1, FF2, FF3; California Zephyr
Ball Arena–Elitch Gardens	Denver	April 5, 2002	Mainline rail interchange
Empower Field at Mile High	Denver	April 5, 2002	Mainline rail interchange
Auraria West	Denver	April 5, 2002	Mainline rail interchange
10th & Osage	Denver	October 8, 1994	Mainline rail interchange
Alameda	Denver	October 8, 1994	3, 4, 52, ART
I-25 & Broadway	Denver	October 8, 1994	0, 0L, 11, 14; Park and ride: 988 spaces
Evans	Denver	July 14, 2000	21, 22; Park and ride: 99 spaces
Bates	Englewood	—N/a	
Englewood	Englewood	July 14, 2000	0, 0B, 12, 35, 51; Park and ride: 910 spaces
Oxford–City of Sheridan	Sheridan	July 14, 2000	51
Littleton–Downtown	Littleton	July 14, 2000	30, 59, 66; Park and ride: 361 spaces
Littleton–Mineral	Littleton	July 14, 2000	402L; Park and ride: 1,227 spaces
C-470 & Erickson	Highlands Ranch	—N/a	
C-470 & Castillo	Highlands Ranch	—N/a	
