= Littleton, Colorado =

City in Colorado, United States

- Home rule municipality
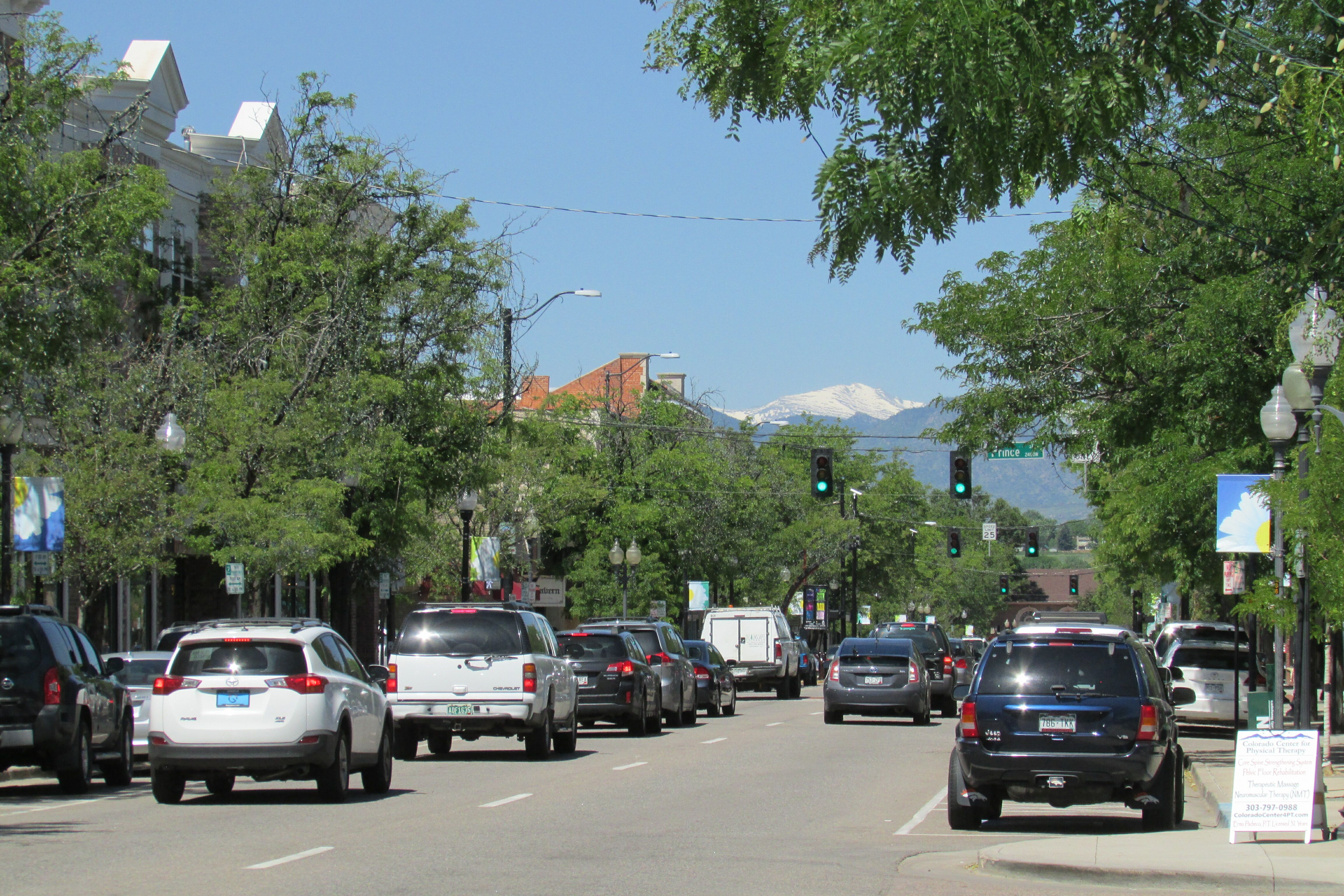
- Downtown Littleton, 2015.

- Location of the City of Littleton in Arapahoe County, Colorado
- Coordinates: 39°36′48″N 105°01′05″W
- Country: United States
- State: Colorado
- Counties: Arapahoe County
- City: Littleton
- Settled: 1862
- Incorporated: March 13, 1890
- Named for: Richard Little

Government
  - Type: Council–manager government
  - Mayor: Kyle Schlachter

Area
  - Total: 35.63 km^{2} (13.76 sq mi)
  - Land: 32.69 km^{2} (12.62 sq mi)
  - Water: 2.93 km^{2} (1.13 sq mi)
- Elevation: 1,645 m (5,397 ft)

Population (2020)
  - Total: 45,652
  - Density: 1,281.92/km^{2} (3,320.15/sq mi)
- Time zone: UTC−07:00 (MST)
  - Summer (DST): UTC−06:00 (MDT)
- ZIP codes: 80120-80130, 80160-80163 (PO Boxes), 80165, 80166
- Area codes: Both 303 and 720
- FIPS code: 08-45255
- GNIS feature ID: 2410845
- Website: littletonco.gov/

Littleton is a home rule municipality city located in Arapahoe County, Colorado, United States. Littleton is the county seat of Arapahoe County and is a part of the Denver–Aurora–Centennial, CO Metropolitan Statistical Area. The city population was 45,652 at the 2020 United States census, ranking as the 20th most populous municipality in Colorado.

== History ==
The city of Littleton's history dates back to the 1859 Pike's Peak gold rush, which brought not just gold seekers, but merchants and farmers to the community. Richard Sullivan Little was an engineer from New Hampshire who came West to work on irrigation systems. Little soon decided to settle in the area at present day Littleton and brought his wife Angeline from the East in 1862. The Littles and neighbors built the Rough and Ready Flour Mill in 1867, which provided a solid economic base in the community. By 1890, the community had grown to 245 people and the residents voted to incorporate the Town of Littleton.

Littleton grew significantly throughout the 1950s and 1960s due to its proximity to Denver and to the Martin Marietta facilities, which produced the Titan rocket and other aerospace products. Littleton is today fully engulfed in metropolitan Denver.

Littleton became widely known in 1999 when the Columbine High School massacre occurred, where two of the school's students, Eric Harris and Dylan Klebold, murdered 13 students and one teacher, injured 22 others, and then killed themselves. News media wrongly reported that the incident happened in the city because the school's ZIP code is primarily associated with Littleton. The school is actually located in the adjacent unincorporated community Columbine, which is not a place name accepted by the U.S. Postal Service; subsequently, locations in ZIP code 80123 use "Littleton" in their mailing addresses by default. Additionally, Columbine High School is in the Jefferson County Public Schools school district and is not in the Littleton Public Schools school district. Despite this, the city became linked with the massacre in the view of the public.

== Geography ==
Littleton is located in central Colorado north of the junction of U.S. Route 85 and Colorado State Highway 470; the city is 9 miles (14 km) south of downtown Denver and 55 miles (89 km) north of Colorado Springs.

Littleton lies on the South Platte River in the Colorado Piedmont region of the Great Plains a few miles east of the Front Range of the Southern Rocky Mountains. Most of the city lies on the east side of the river. Several small tributaries of the river flow northwest through the city; from north to south, these include Big Dry Creek, Slaughterhouse Gulch, Lee Gulch, and Dad Clark Gulch. In addition, several small lakes and reservoirs are located along the river in the southwestern part of the city. Immediately west of the river are Cooley Lake, Bufflehead Lake, South Platte Reservoir, Eaglewatch Lake, Redtail Lake, and Blackrock Lake. Wolhurst Lake and McLellen Reservoir are east of the river, fed and drained by Dad Clark Gulch. Chatfield Reservoir lies immediately southwest of the city.

According to the United States Census Bureau, the city has a total area of 13.87 square miles (35.9 km^{2}) of which 12.98 square miles (33.6 km^{2}) is land and 0.89 square miles (2.3 km^{2}) (6.4%) is water.

As a suburb of Denver, Littleton is part of the Denver-Aurora metropolitan area and the Front Range Urban Corridor. It shares a border with Denver and Englewood on the north, Greenwood Village on the northeast, Centennial on the east, Highlands Ranch on the south, Columbine and Columbine Valley on the west, and Bow Mar on the northwest.

Unlike most county seats of suburban counties, Littleton is on the same house numbering grid, including its downtown, as the major city, in this case, Denver.

=== Climate ===
Climate data for Littleton, Colorado (Elevation 5,310ft)
Month	Jan	Feb	Mar	Apr	May	Jun	Jul	Aug	Sep	Oct	Nov	Dec	Year
Record high °F (°C)	78 (26)	76 (24)	86 (30)	88 (31)	90 (32)	98 (37)	99 (37)	98 (37)	94 (34)	88 (31)	82 (28)	76 (24)	99 (37)
Mean daily maximum °F (°C)	43.8 (6.6)	47.2 (8.4)	53.9 (12.2)	62.6 (17.0)	69.4 (20.8)	80.3 (26.8)	85.4 (29.7)	82.7 (28.2)	75.4 (24.1)	64.1 (17.8)	51.0 (10.6)	43.0 (6.1)	63.2 (17.3)
Mean daily minimum °F (°C)	15.3 (−9.3)	19.1 (−7.2)	27.7 (−2.4)	35.1 (1.7)	43.4 (6.3)	52.6 (11.4)	57.6 (14.2)	55.8 (13.2)	46.6 (8.1)	33.7 (0.9)	22.8 (−5.1)	15.0 (−9.4)	35.4 (1.9)
Record low °F (°C)	−20 (−29)	−23 (−31)	−5 (−21)	6 (−14)	21 (−6)	36 (2)	44 (7)	42 (6)	17 (−8)	2 (−17)	−2 (−19)	−29 (−34)	−29 (−34)
Average precipitation inches (mm)	0.36 (9.1)	0.47 (12)	1.44 (37)	1.50 (38)	2.75 (70)	1.88 (48)	1.89 (48)	1.99 (51)	1.09 (28)	1.23 (31)	1.14 (29)	0.64 (16)	16.39 (416)
Average snowfall inches (cm)	8.9 (23)	7.8 (20)	11.9 (30)	7.8 (20)	0.6 (1.5)	0 (0)	0 (0)	0 (0)	0.9 (2.3)	3.0 (7.6)	12.2 (31)	12.7 (32)	65.7 (167)
Source: The Western Regional Climate Center

== Demographics ==
Historical population
Census	Pop.	Note	%±
1880	100		—
1900	738		—
1910	1,373		86.0%
1920	1,636		19.2%
1930	2,019		23.4%
1940	2,244		11.1%
1950	3,378		50.5%
1960	13,670		304.7%
1970	26,466		93.6%
1980	28,631		8.2%
1990	33,685		17.7%
2000	40,340		19.8%
2010	41,737		3.5%
2020	45,652		9.4%
2024 (est.)	44,879	▼	−1.7%
U.S. Decennial Census

=== 2020 census ===
As of the 2020 census, Littleton had a population of 45,652, and the population density was 3,215.5 inhabitants per square mile (1,241.5/km^{2}). 100.0% of residents lived in urban areas, while 0.0% lived in rural areas.

The median age was 40.9 years. 19.1% of residents were under the age of 18 and 18.7% of residents were 65 years of age or older. For every 100 females there were 93.7 males, and for every 100 females age 18 and over there were 91.8 males age 18 and over.

There were 20,204 households in Littleton, of which 24.4% had children under the age of 18 living in them. Of all households, 43.2% were married-couple households, 20.7% were households with a male householder and no spouse or partner present, and 29.0% were households with a female householder and no spouse or partner present. About 33.5% of all households were made up of individuals and 12.8% had someone living alone who was 65 years of age or older.

There were 21,476 housing units, of which 1,272 (5.9%) were vacant. The homeowner vacancy rate was 1.1% and the rental vacancy rate was 7.7%.

Racial composition as of the 2020 census
Race	Number	Percent
White	36,966	81.0%
Black or African American	657	1.4%
American Indian and Alaska Native	413	0.9%
Asian	1,035	2.3%
Native Hawaiian and Other Pacific Islander	36	0.1%
Some other race	1,995	4.4%
Two or more races	4,550	10.0%
Hispanic or Latino (of any race)	6,201	13.6%

=== 2023 estimates ===
In 2023 the racial makeup of the city was 83.1% White, 2.9% Asian, 1.6% African American, 0.8% American Indian and Alaska Native, 0.1% Pacific Islander, and 7.8% from two or more races. Hispanics and Latinos of any race were 12.6% of the population. 10.3% of residents spoke a language other than English at home; 7.0% of the city's population spoke Spanish.

There were 20,300 households, out of which 18.5% had children under the age of 18 living with them, 44.3% were married couples living together, 20.6% had a male householder with no spouse, and 27.5% had a female householder with no spouse. The average household size was 2.19.

As of 2023 the distribution of the population by age was 18.5% under the age of 18, 6.3% from 18 to 24, 31.3% from 25 to 44, 24.7% from 45 to 64, and 19.3% who were 65 years of age or older. The median age was 40.2 years. The gender makeup of the city was 49.3% male and 50.7% female.

The median income for a household in the city was $96,611, and the median income for a family was $130,080. Males had a median income of $52,674 versus $40,297 for females. The city's per capita income was $126,140. About 6.3% of the population were below the poverty line, including 4.0% of those under age 18 and 10.5% of those age 65 or over.

== Economy ==
As of 2023, 68.0% of the population over the age of 16 was in the labor force. The occupational composition of the employed civilian labor force was: 54.2% in management, business, science, and arts; 17.3% in sales and office occupations; 12.6% in service occupations; 9.3% in production, transportation, and material moving; and 6.7% in natural resources, construction, and maintenance. The three industries employing the largest percentages of the working civilian labor force were: educational services, health care, and social assistance (20.3%); professional, scientific, and management, and administrative and waste management services (16.0%); and finance and insurance, and real estate and rental leasing (9.5%).

The cost of living in Littleton is average; compared to a U.S. average of 100, the cost of living index for the community is 102.7. As of 2023, the median home value in the city was $596,700, the median selected monthly owner cost was $2,320 for housing units with a mortgage and $732 for those without, and the median gross rent was $1,731.

=== Housing ===
The city's housing stock is primarily made up of either detached single-family or apartment buildings. In 2025, there was a proposal to permit so-called "missing middle" housing (duplexes, triplexes and fourplexes) in neighborhoods that were exclusively zoned for single-family homes, but six council members voted against it while Mayor Pro Tem Stephen Barr cast the lone vote in favor of the proposal. Also in 2025, a citizen-led effort to freeze Littleton’s single family residential land use code and restrict the city council’s ability to permit “missing middle” housing passed by 54%-46% on the November ballot.

== Government ==
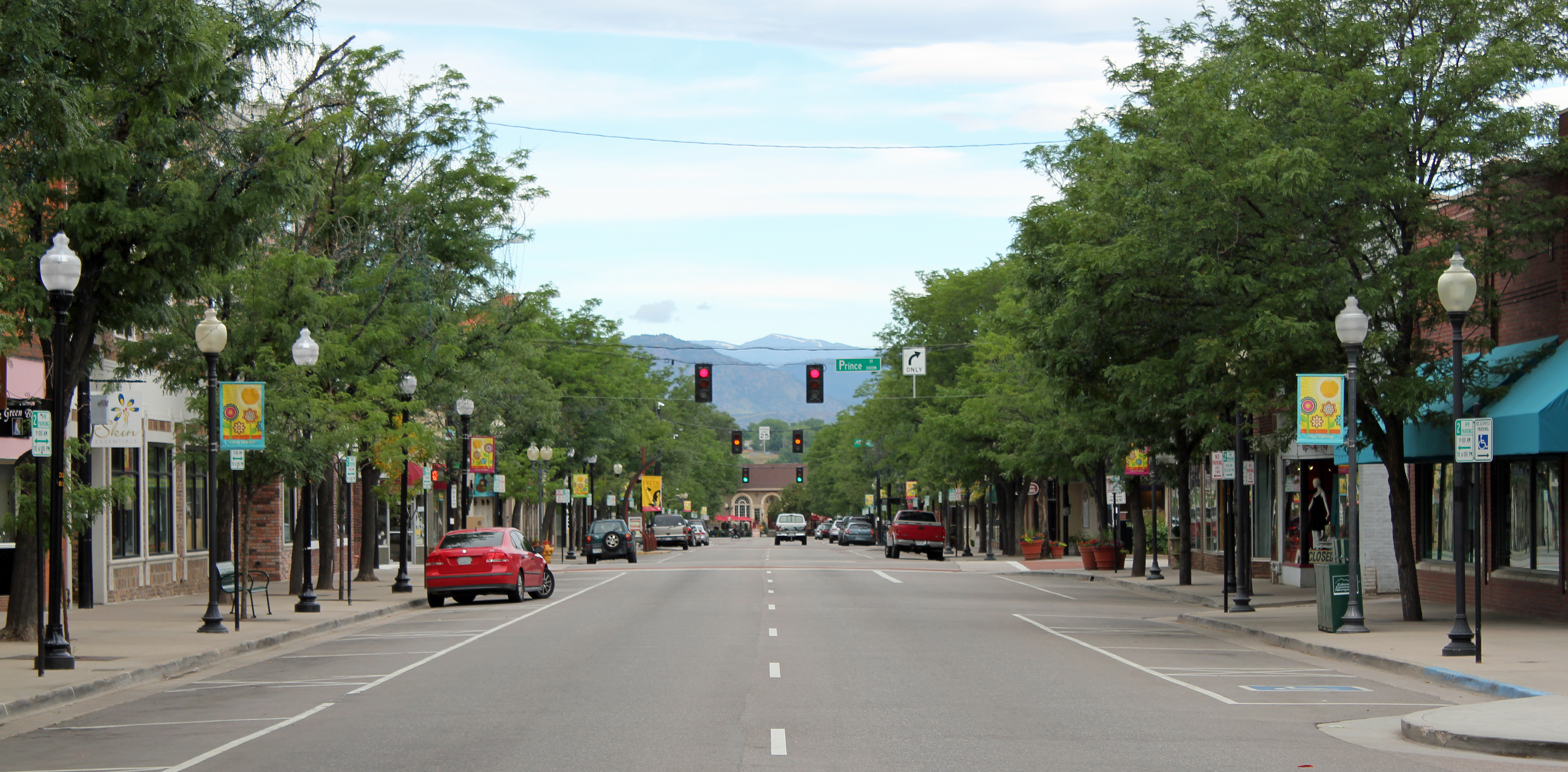
Main Street in Downtown Littleton

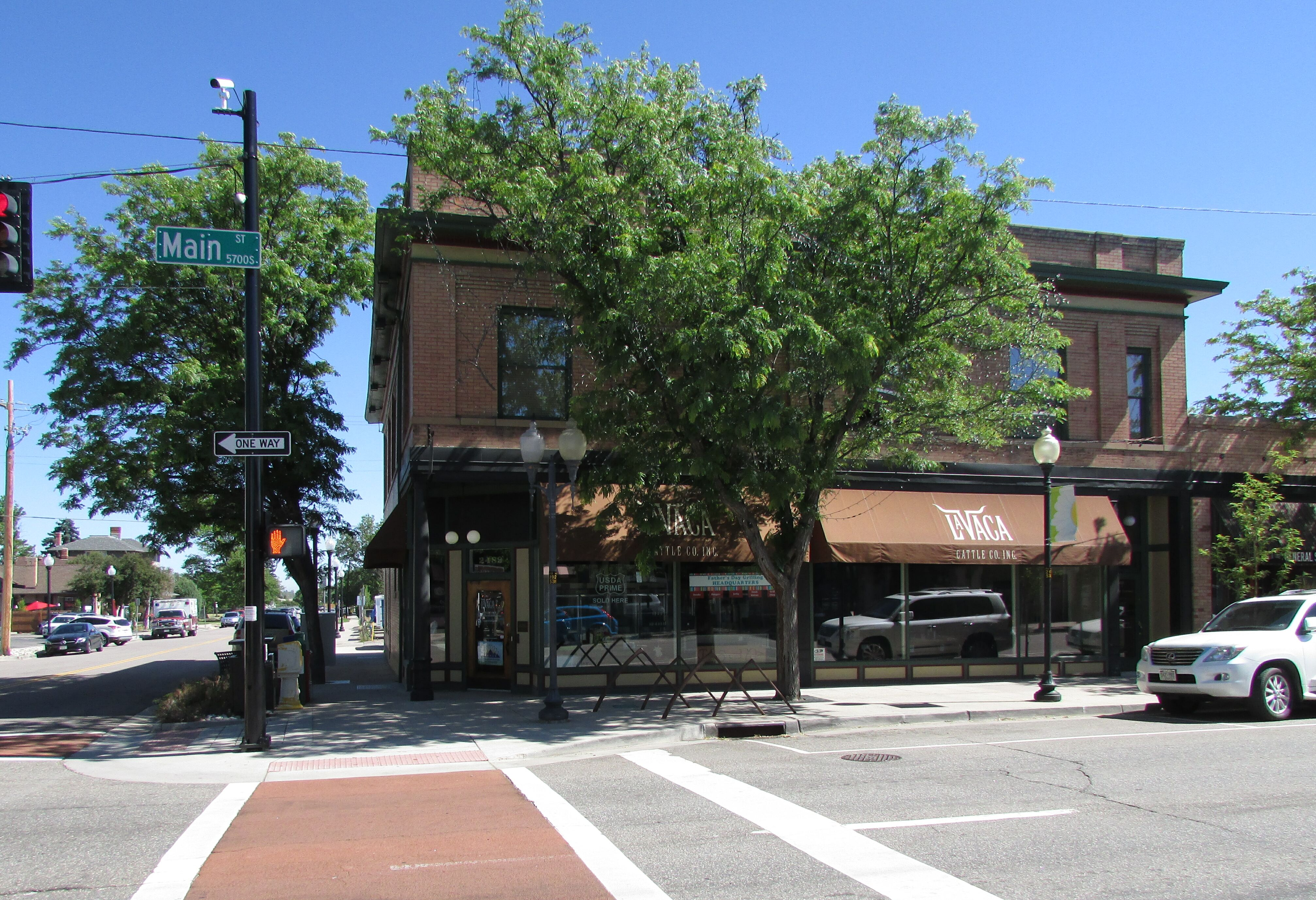
Coors Building

Littleton is a home-rule municipality with a council-manager form of government. The city council makes policy for the city and approves the annual city budget. The city manager implements the council's policies and oversees day-to-day administration of the city government and its departments.

As the county seat, Littleton is the administrative center of Arapahoe County. The county government's main Administration Building is located in Littleton, and most county government departments base their operations in the city.

Littleton lies mostly within Colorado's 6th U.S. Congressional District, but changes made to Colorado's congressional districts in 2021 put the portion of the city within Douglas County into Colorado's 4th congressional district. For the purposes of representation in the Colorado General Assembly, the city is located in the 16th and 30th districts of the Colorado Senate and the 25th, 38th, and 43rd districts of the Colorado House of Representatives.

=== Elected officials ===
The council consists of seven members - one member for each of the four legislative districts, two at-large members, and the mayor. Beginning in 2021, all council members are elected to 4-year terms. General elections for city council are held in odd-numbered years with either three or four council seats up for election. In 2021, Littleton voters elected the first popularly-elected mayor to a four-year term. Mayor Kyle Schlachter represents Littleton on the Metro Mayors Caucus (MMC) and serves as the 2026 MMC Chair.

Current Littleton City Council makeup
Member	District	Term
Kyle Schlachter	Mayor (At Large)	2025-2029
Joel Zink	At Large	2025-2029
Pam Grove	At Large	2023-2027
Merrill Stillwell	District 1	2025-2029
Robert Reichardt	District 2	2023-2027
Amanda Henderson	District 3	2025-2029
Andrea Peters	District 4	2023-2027

List of mayors of Littleton
Mayor	Term
Franklin S. Gilmore	1890–1891
Dr. D.S. Weaver	1891–1892
H.H. Shepperd	1892–1893
J. Vanatta	1893–1894
G.M. Benedict	1894–1895
H.H. Shepperd	1895–1896
G.M. Benedict	1896–1897
C.H. Barclay	1897–1898
H.H. Shepperd	1898–1901
C.W. Sittser	1901–1902
Dr. J.A. Farnsworth	1902–1905
R.F. Gill	1905–1906
H.H. Shepperd	1906–1908
Dr. W.C. Crysler	1908–1910
J.E. Maloney	1910–1912
John B. Mayers	1912–1913
J.E. Maloney	1913–1919
S.A. Noyes	1919–1921
O.C. Hoffman	1921–1924
Dr. W.C. Crysler	1924–1926
C.E. Stephenson	1926–1929
Charles G. Louthan	1929–1932
Dr. C.C. Harrod	1932–1934
Charles G. Louthan	1934–1940
H.H. Taylor	1941–1946
Roy E. Babcock	1946–1948
George Malcolm	1948–1952
Norman Granes	1952–1956
Frank A. Randall	1956–1957
A.N. (Bert) Williams	1957–1959
Everett Dawson	1959–1960
Gordon F. Taylor	1960–1963
Thomas R. Heaton	1963–1965
John G. Kinghorn	1965–1969
A.R. Bessette	1969–1971
F. Vaughn Gardinier	1971–1975
Harold Meyer	1975–1977
Sally M. Parsons	1977–1979
James P. Collins	1979–1983
Charley Emley	1983–1989
Susan Thornton	1989–1993
Dennis Reynolds	1993–1997
Pat Cronenberger	1997–1999
Susan Thornton	1999–2003
John Ostermiller	2003–2005
Jim Taylor	2005–2007
Doug Clark	2007– 2011
Debbie Brinkman	2011– 2013
Phil Cernanec	2013– 2015
Bruce Beckman	2015– 2017
Debbie Brinkman	2017– 2019
Jerry Valdes	2019– 2021
Kyle Schlachter	2021– present

=== ZIP codes ===
The place name "Littleton" was assigned to eleven ZIP codes which cover a vast area west, east, and south of the city much larger than the city itself. This area includes the following unincorporated communities:

- Acres Green
- Carriage Club (since incorporated as a neighborhood of Lone Tree)
- Columbine
- Heritage Hills
- Highlands Ranch ("Highlands Ranch" is also acceptable in place of "Littleton" in mailing addresses)
- Ken Caryl
- Roxborough Park

In addition, an extreme southwest portion of Denver, the Marston neighborhood, is located in a ZIP code (80123) with "Littleton" as the preferred place name for use in mailing addresses, though "Denver" is also acceptable. The Federal Correctional Institution, Englewood, also located in this ZIP code, is neither in Littleton nor Englewood, but in unincorporated Jefferson County.

== Education ==
=== Primary and secondary education ===
The majority of the portion in Arapahoe County is in Littleton Public Schools. Small portions are in the Sheridan School District 2 and Englewood School District 1.

The Littleton school district operates three high schools in the city limits:

- Heritage High School
- Littleton High School
- Arapahoe High School

The small portion of Littleton in Jefferson County is within Jeffco Public Schools. The small portion of Littleton in Douglas County is within Douglas County School District RE-1.

=== Colleges and universities ===
- Arapahoe Community College
- Denver Seminary

The Colorado Center for the Blind, a skills training program for blind teenagers and adults operated by the National Federation of the Blind, is located in Littleton.

== Transportation ==
=== Highways ===
Four highways run through the city of Littleton:

- US 85 (South Santa Fe Drive) is the longest highway within the municipality. It runs from the city's northern border with Englewood to the city's southern border with Highlands Ranch.
- State Highway 75 (South Platte Canyon Road) begins in Littleton at an intersection with West Bowles Avenue before continuing south into Columbine Valley. Later on it runs along the western border of Littleton with Columbine.
- State Highway 88 (East Belleview Avenue) runs near the northern edge of the city. The highway both enters and exits Littleton through Englewood.
- State Highway 470 runs along the southern edge of the city. It enters east from Highlands Ranch before going west to Columbine.

=== Mass transit ===
The Regional Transportation District provides bus and light rail service to Littleton. Light rail service to the city began on July 14, 2000, on the C and D Lines, however C Line operation ended on January 10, 2021. There are two light rail stations within the city, Littleton-Downtown station located within downtown Littleton and Littleton-Mineral station located near the Aspen Grove shopping center, which serves as the southern terminus of the D Line.

== Culture ==
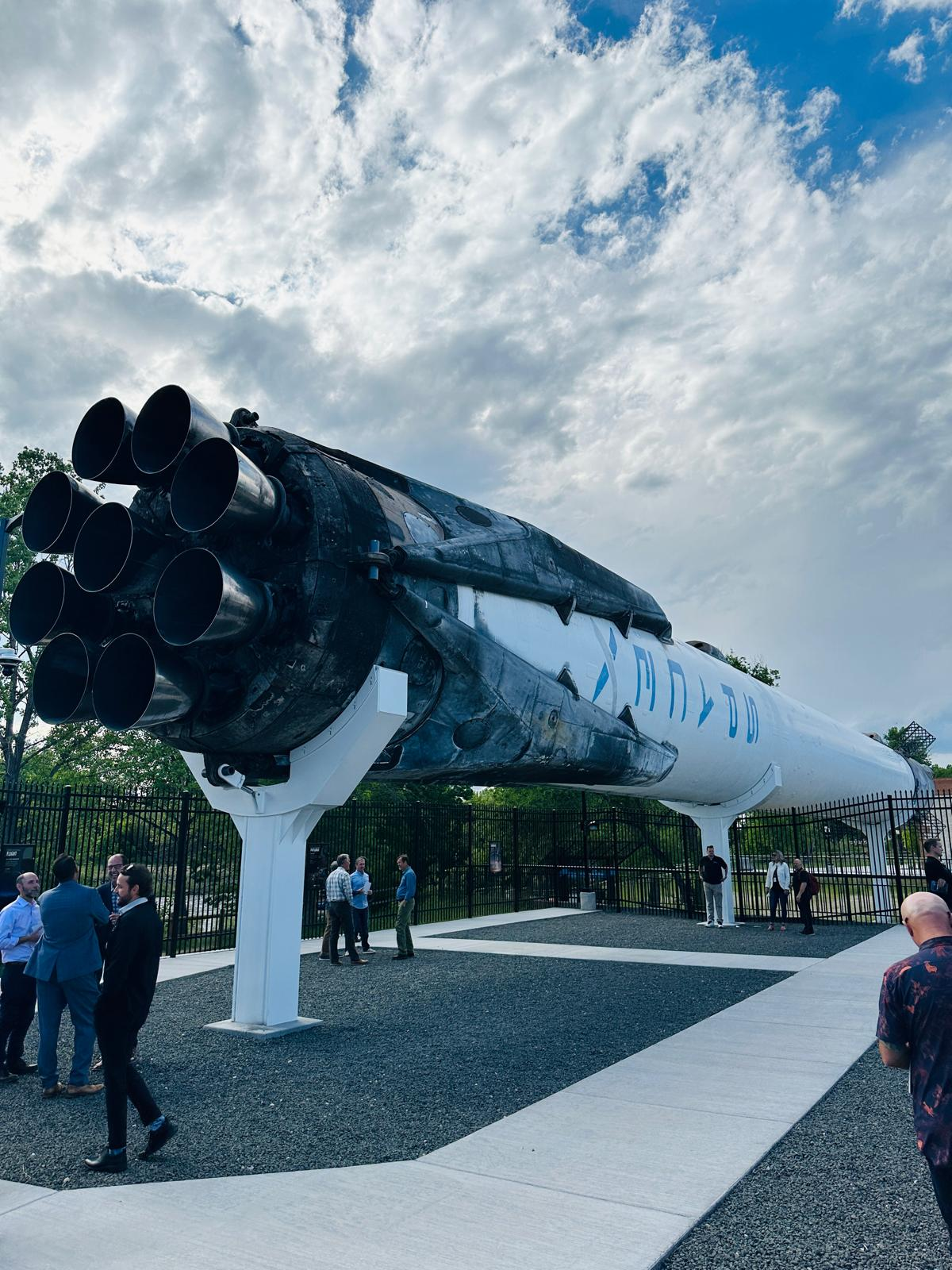
Falcon 9 Rocket Booster opened for general public at Dish Network's Littleton, CO office is a type of reusable rocket that SpaceX used for repeated launches

=== Arts and music ===
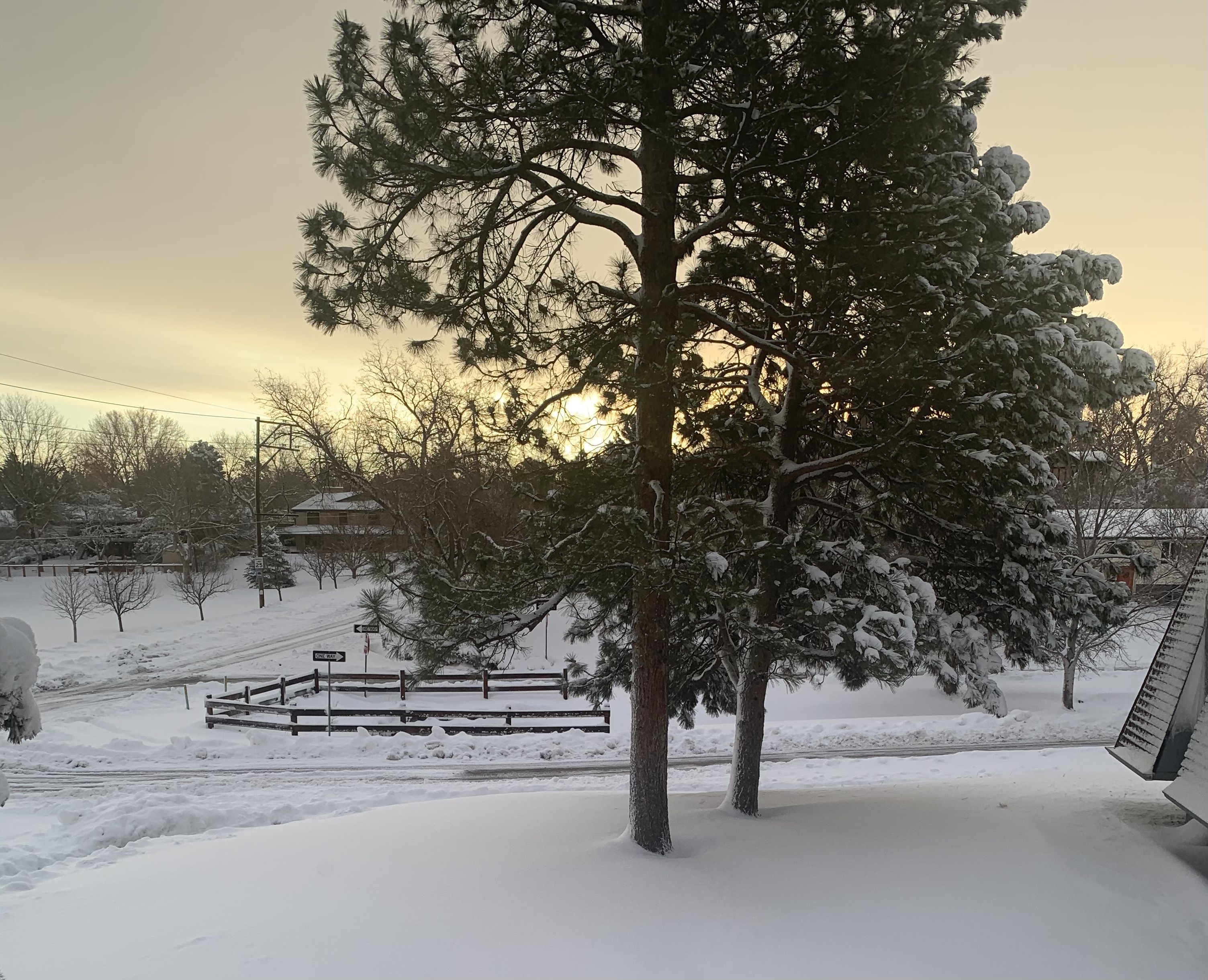
Snow in Littleton, Colorado, during March 2021

- Town Hall Arts Center
- The Depot Art Gallery and Littleton Fine Arts Guild
- Littleton Symphony Orchestra
- Voices West (fka Littleton Chorale)
- Littleton Museum
- SpaceX Falcon 9 booster

=== Events ===
Western Welcome Week
Since the late 1920s, Littleton has celebrated Western Welcome Week - an annual community celebration in the greater Littleton area. Western Welcome Week started in the late 1920s, and has been held every year since. Western Welcome Week includes over 40 events benefiting dozens of local civic and charitable organizations.

Candlelight Walk
The Candlelight Walk is a Littleton tradition, featuring an evening of holiday festivities, culminating in the illumination of the trees on Main Street.

==== Twilight Criterium ====
The Littleton Twilight Criterium occurs in the late summer in Historic Downtown Littleton on a 0.8-mile course. The event features famous athletes, concerts, and a cruiser ride for the general public.

=== Healthcare ===
The only hospital is AdventHealth Littleton.

=== Points of interest ===
- Hudson Gardens
- Town Hall Arts Center, providing professional theater to the surrounding metro area.
- The Littleton Museum
- Gravesite of Alferd Packer

== Sister cities ==
- Bega, New South Wales, Australia

== See also ==
- List of municipalities in Colorado
- List of people from Littleton, Colorado
