= Empower Field at Mile High station =

Light rail station in Denver, Colorado

Empower Field at Mile High
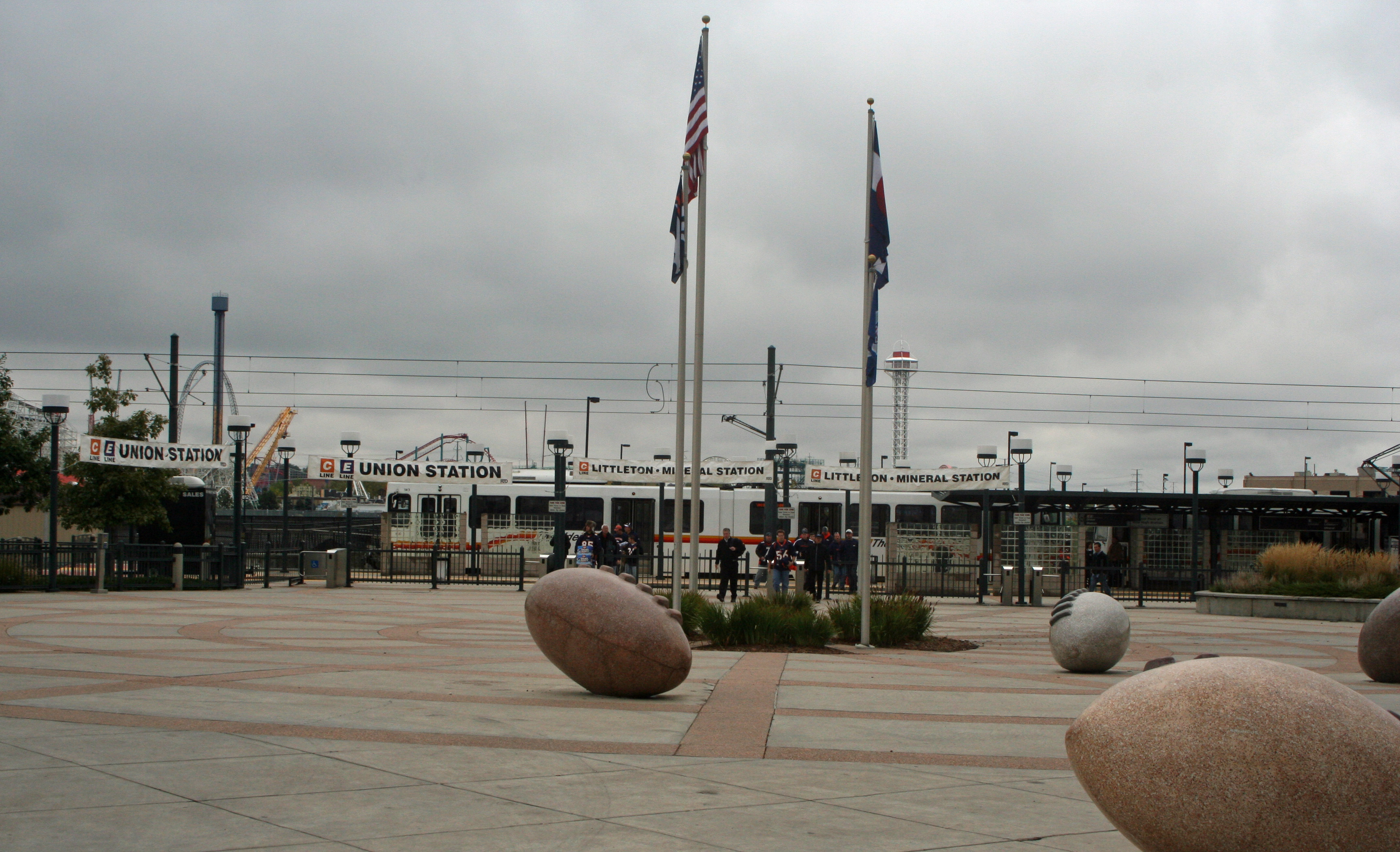
- Empower Field at Mile High station, the banners direct departing football fans to the proper train

General information
- Location: Fourth & Walnut Streets; Denver, Colorado
- Coordinates: 39.743457°N 105.013198°W
- Line: Central Platte Valley
- Platforms: 2 side platforms, 1 island platform
- Tracks: 2

Construction
- Structure type: At-grade
- Cycle facilities: Racks
- Accessible: Yes

History
- Opened: April 5, 2002
- Former names: Invesco Field at Mile High; Sports Authority Field at Mile High; Broncos Stadium at Mile High

Passengers
- 2025: 733 (average daily)
- Rank: 44 out of 75

Services
Preceding station	RTD	Following station
Ball Arena–Elitch Gardens toward Union Station	C Line	Auraria West toward Littleton–Mineral
Ball Arena–Elitch Gardens toward Union Station	E Line	Auraria West toward RidgeGate Parkway
Ball Arena–Elitch Gardens toward Union Station	W Line	Auraria West toward JeffCo Gov't Cntr•Golden
Location

Empower Field at Mile High station (formerly Invesco Field at Mile High, Sports Authority Field at Mile High and Broncos Stadium at Mile High) is an RTD light rail station in Denver, Colorado, United States. Operating as part of the C, E, and W lines, the station was opened on April 5, 2002, and is operated by the Regional Transportation District. It primarily serves the adjacent Empower Field at Mile High stadium.

== Station layout ==
1F

Platform Level

Side platform, doors will open on both sides
Inbound
← toward Union Station (Ball Arena-Elitch Gardens)
Island platform, doors will open on both sides
Outbound
toward Littleton-Mineral (Auraria West) →
toward RidgeGate Parkway (Auraria West) →
toward Jeffco Government Center-Golden (Auraria West) →
Side platform, doors will open on both sides
Pedestrian walkway to Empower Field at Mile High

The station is less than 1,000 feet northwest of Auraria West station. During Denver Broncos gamedays and other events at Empower Field at Mile High, Auraria West is often closed in order to consolidate foot traffic and ticket checks for the area at this station.
