= Sheridan, Colorado =

City in Colorado, United States

- Home rule municipality
- City of Sheridan
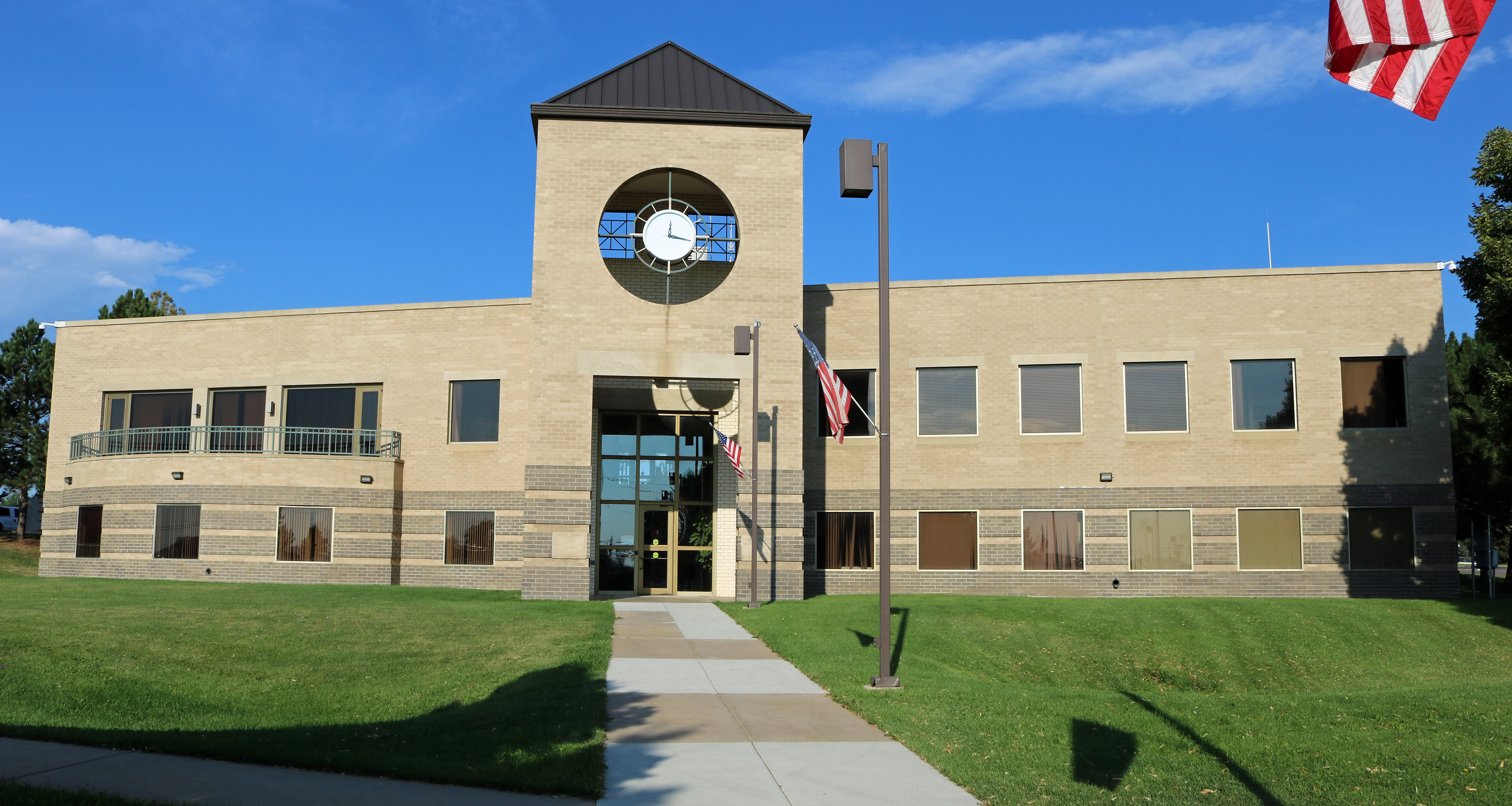
- The Sheridan City Hall

- Location of the City of Sheridan in Arapahoe County, Colorado
- Coordinates: 39°38′48″N 105°01′05″W
- Country: United States
- State: Colorado
- County: Arapahoe County
- City: Sheridan
- Incorporated: April 1890
- Named for: Philip Sheridan

Government
  - Type: Home rule municipality
  - Mayor: Sally Diagle

Area
  - Total: 2.29 sq mi (5.93 km^{2})
  - Land: 2.22 sq mi (5.76 km^{2})
  - Water: 0.066 sq mi (0.17 km^{2})
- Elevation: 5,286 ft (1,611 m)

Population (2020)
  - Total: 6,105
  - Density: 2,750/sq mi (1,060/km^{2})
- Time zone: UTC-7 (MST)
  - Summer (DST): UTC-6 (MDT)
- ZIP code: 80110
- Area codes: Both 303 and 720
- FIPS code: 08-69645
- GNIS feature ID: 2411885
- Website: www.ci.sheridan.co.us

The City of Sheridan is a home rule municipality located in Arapahoe County, Colorado, United States. Sheridan is a part of the Denver–Aurora–Lakewood, CO Metropolitan Statistical Area. The population was 6,105 at the 2020 census.

== History ==
Sheridan was originally part of the Indian Territory and has always been a small community. The first white settler of what would become Sheridan was John McBroom in the spring of 1859. He homesteaded 160 acres (0.65 km^{2}). The town was initially named Petersburg. McBroom built his first log cabin near Bear Creek which he later abandoned in 1866 when he married Emma J. Bennett. He prospered as a farmer and found a viable market in Denver for his goods. He was joined by his brother, Isaac McBroom, in June 1860, who also homesteaded a little over 160 acres (0.65 km^{2}). The laying out of the town of Sheridan is credited to Isaac. He was also responsible for the name change from Petersburg to Sheridan. Isaac McBroom's cabin can be toured at the Littleton Historical Museum.

Another prominent figure in Sheridan's early history was Peter Magnes. Originally from Sweden, Magnes was a farmer who immigrated to the United States at the age of 26. In 1859, his first daughter was born on the banks of Cherry Creek. He also purchased 160 acres (0.65 km^{2}) of land and built a small log cabin. In 1865 Magnes laid out the town of Petersburg and encouraged Swedish families to immigrate to his town. The town had a railroad, hotel, blacksmith, church, newspaper, post office and, of course, taverns. The state of Colorado was formed in 1876, putting Sheridan within its new boundaries.

Citizens began moving toward incorporation of Sheridan in January 1890. There was some dispute among the petitioners about boundaries, and the final results were filed in February 1890. On April 14, 1890, the town of Sheridan was incorporated.

Sheridan gets its name from U.S. Army General Philip H. Sheridan. General Sheridan established Fort Logan, which was originally known as the "Camp close to Denver". It was on the site known as the Johnson Tract, south of the city, with a water supply, the proximity of the railroad, "available space for a parade ground, artesian well possibilities, the beautiful view and the distance from Denver and its saloons." Because of the military post Sheridan continued to flourish. However, eventually the post was shut down, and it is now a mental health facility that borders Sheridan.

Sheridan has remained a community that continues to influence the surrounding areas, most recently with current redevelopment projects.

== Geography ==
According to the United States Census Bureau, the city has a total area of 2.3 square miles (5.9 km^{2}), of which 2.2 square miles (5.7 km^{2}) is land and 0.077 square miles (0.2 km^{2}), or 2.91%, is water.

== Demographics ==
Historical population
Census	Pop.	Note	%±
1900	442		—
1910	498		12.7%
1920	455		−8.6%
1930	587		29.0%
1940	712		21.3%
1950	1,715		140.9%
1960	3,559		107.5%
1970	4,787		34.5%
1980	5,377		12.3%
1990	4,976		−7.5%
2000	5,600		12.5%
2010	5,664		1.1%
2020	6,105		7.8%
U.S. Decennial Census

=== 2020 census ===
As of the 2020 census, Sheridan had a population of 6,105. The median age was 35.8 years. 21.3% of residents were under the age of 18 and 13.9% of residents were 65 years of age or older. For every 100 females there were 102.4 males, and for every 100 females age 18 and over there were 101.6 males age 18 and over.

100.0% of residents lived in urban areas, while 0.0% lived in rural areas.

There were 2,469 households in Sheridan, of which 30.3% had children under the age of 18 living in them. Of all households, 33.7% were married-couple households, 27.3% were households with a male householder and no spouse or partner present, and 30.0% were households with a female householder and no spouse or partner present. About 31.3% of all households were made up of individuals and 11.4% had someone living alone who was 65 years of age or older.

There were 2,635 housing units, of which 6.3% were vacant. The homeowner vacancy rate was 1.8% and the rental vacancy rate was 5.9%.

Racial composition as of the 2020 census
Race	Number	Percent
White	3,429	56.2%
Black or African American	260	4.3%
American Indian and Alaska Native	164	2.7%
Asian	211	3.5%
Native Hawaiian and Other Pacific Islander	6	0.1%
Some other race	1,074	17.6%
Two or more races	961	15.7%
Hispanic or Latino (of any race)	2,597	42.5%

== Education ==
The Sheridan School District operates area public schools.

== Transportation ==
=== Highways ===
Three highways run through the city of Sheridan:

- US 85 (South Santa Fe Drive) runs along the city's eastern edge, both entering and exiting Sheridan via Englewood
- US 285 runs east–west within the city. It runs from the city's eastern border with Englewood to its western border with Denver.
- State Highway 88 (South Federal Boulevard) runs from the city's southern border with Englewood to its northern border with Denver.

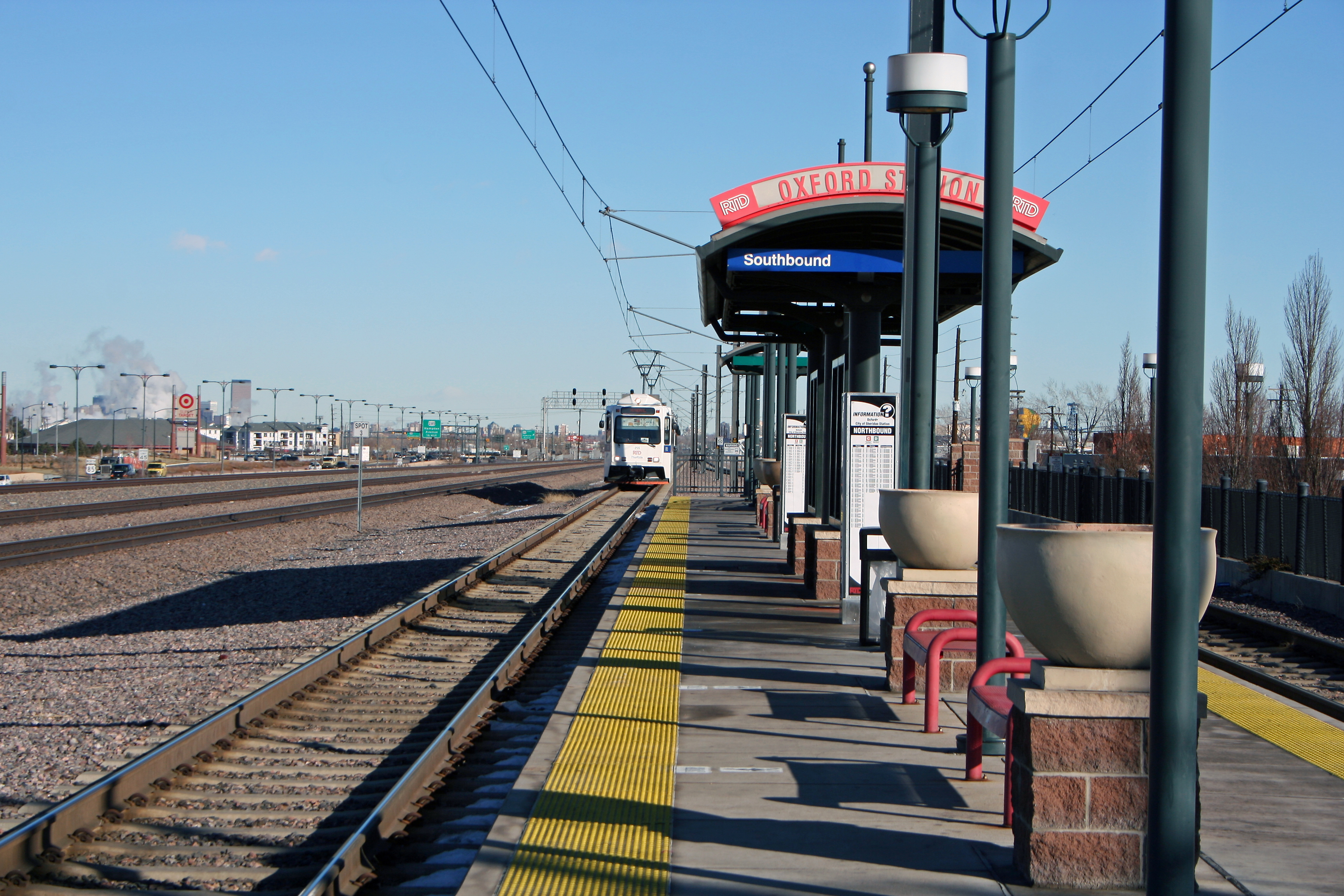
The Oxford/City of Sheridan light rail station

=== Mass transit ===
The Regional Transportation District provides bus and light rail service to Sheridan. Light rail service to the city began on July 14, 2000, on the C and D Lines, however C Line operation ended on January 10, 2021. Oxford-City of Sheridan station serves as the sole light rail station within the city. While the station platform is located within the city, the only entrance to the station is in Englewood.

== See also ==
- Front Range Urban Corridor
