= Sheridan School District (Colorado) =

School district in the United States

Sheridan School District is a school district headquartered in Sheridan, Colorado, United States.

In addition to all of Sheridan, it includes portions of Englewood and Littleton.

On April 1, 2026, members of the Sheridan Educators Association went on strike to reinstate the licensed contract, recognized classified staff as part of the bargaining unit, and to retract disciplinary policies against staff.

== Schools ==
- Sheridan High School
- Soar Academy
- Fort Logan Northgate (4-8)
- Alice Terry Elementary School (K-3)
- Early Childhood Center
