= Colorado Center for the Blind =

Coordinates: 39.6102°N 105.0147°W

Location
- 2233 West Shepperd Ave; Littleton, Colorado 80120

Information
- Type: Non-profit
- Founded: 1988
- Director: Julie Deden
- Affiliation: National Federation of the Blind
- Website: coloradocenterfortheblind.org

Colorado Center for the Blind, in Littleton, Colorado, is a nonprofit training center for blind people.

The Colorado Center for the Blind provides teaching based on the philosophy of blindness advanced by the National Federation of the Blind focusing on independence, opportunity and self-confidence as a way to achieve total integration into society based on equality. The Colorado Center for the Blind also acts as an advocate for the blind community, provides experts on blindness to the national media, and delivers government-sponsored services for the visually impaired. Founded in 1988, the center moved to its current location in 2000 and includes nearby residential apartments for program participants. The largest and most comprehensive program is the residential Independence Training Program for Adults. Other programs are aimed towards Youth and Seniors as well as a general seminar for business and organizations working with the blind. The majority of instructors are blind.
