= Littleton–Mineral station =

Light rail station in Littleton, Colorado

Littleton•Mineral
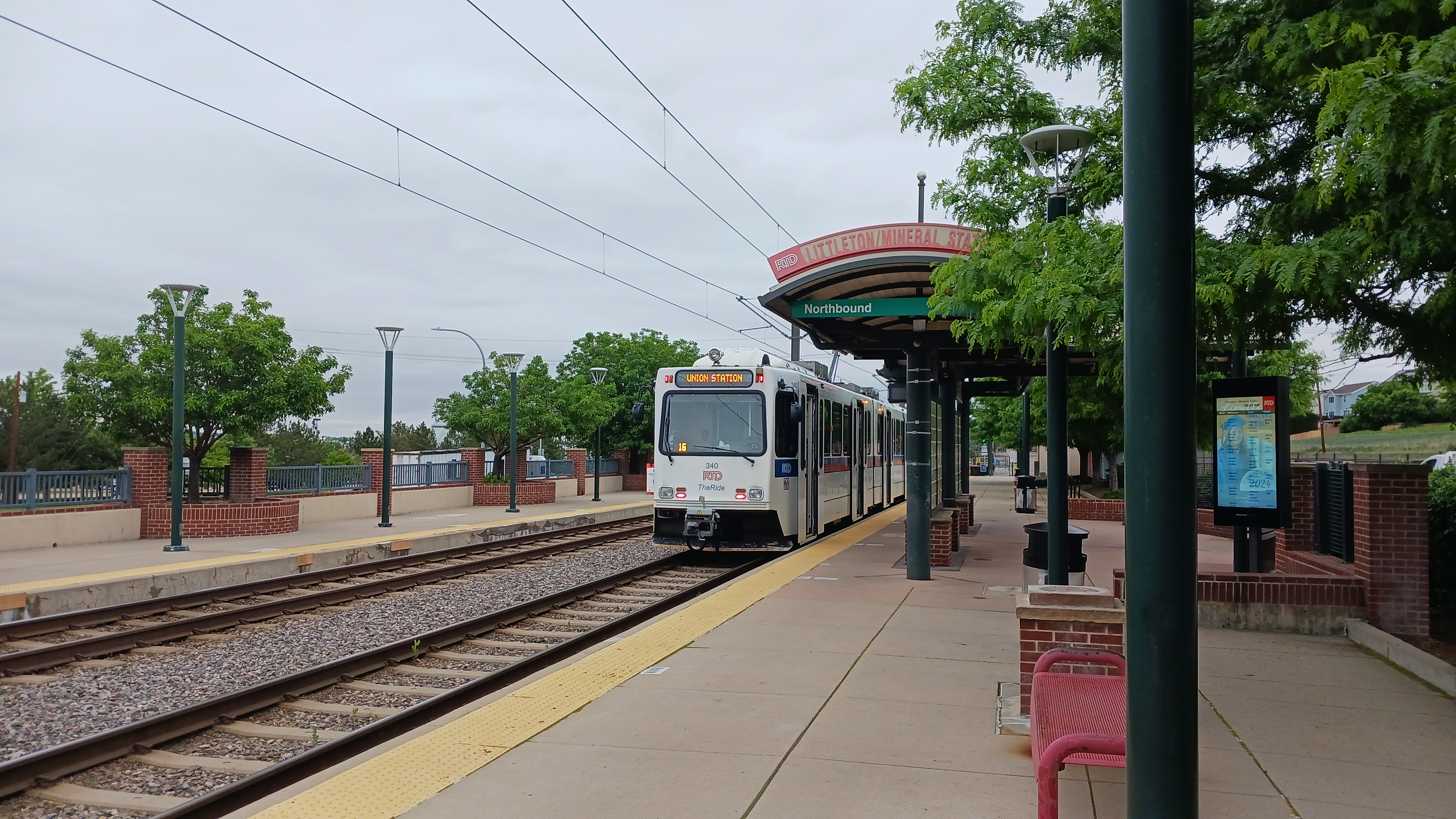
- Mineral station as viewed from the northbound platform

General information
- Other names: Littleton•Mineral
- Location: 3202 West Mineral Avenue; Littleton, Colorado
- Coordinates: 39.580127°N 105.024981°W
- Owner: Regional Transportation District
- Line: Southwest Corridor
- Platforms: 2 side platforms
- Tracks: 2
- Connections: RTD Bus: 402L, South Jeffco FlexRide

Construction
- Structure type: At-grade
- Parking: 1,227 spaces
- Cycle facilities: 10 racks, 30 lockers
- Accessible: Yes

History
- Opened: July 14, 2000

Passengers
- 2025: 1,903 (average daily)
- Rank: 12 out of 75

Services
Preceding station	RTD	Following station
Littleton–Downtown toward Union Station	C Line	Terminus
Former services
Preceding station	RTD	Following station
Littleton–Downtown toward Union Station	D Line	Terminus
Location

Littleton–Mineral station (sometimes styled as Littleton•Mineral or referred to simply as Mineral station) is a RTD light rail station in Littleton, Colorado, United States. The station was opened on July 14, 2000, and is served by the Regional Transportation District. The station sees service on the C Line to Union Station. Currently, Mineral station serves as the southern terminus for the C Line. However, RTD plans to extend this line south to Highlands Ranch as a part of the agency's FasTracks expansion plan.

== Station layout ==
2F

Platform Level

Side platform, doors will open on the left
Northbound
← toward Union Station (Littleton-Downtown)
Northbound
← toward Union Station (Littleton-Downtown)
Side platform, doors will open on the right
Pedestrian bridge
1F
US 85 / Santa Fe Drive
Bus bays; parking

Littleton-Mineral is located at the northeast corner of the intersection between US 85 (Santa Fe Drive) and Mineral Avenue. The station is situated on a berm overlooking the intersection. The station's bus bays and parking lot are located across US 85, and are accessible via a pedestrian bridge.

When opened, the station saw service on the C Line, and the D Line to 30th & Downing station. However, the D Line's northern terminus was changed to 18th & California station in January 2018 and the C Line was suspended on January 10, 2021. The C Line would then be eliminated in January 2023 before being revived in June 2026, with the D Line being eliminated at that time.
