= Colorado Joint Line =

Railway corridor in Colorado, US

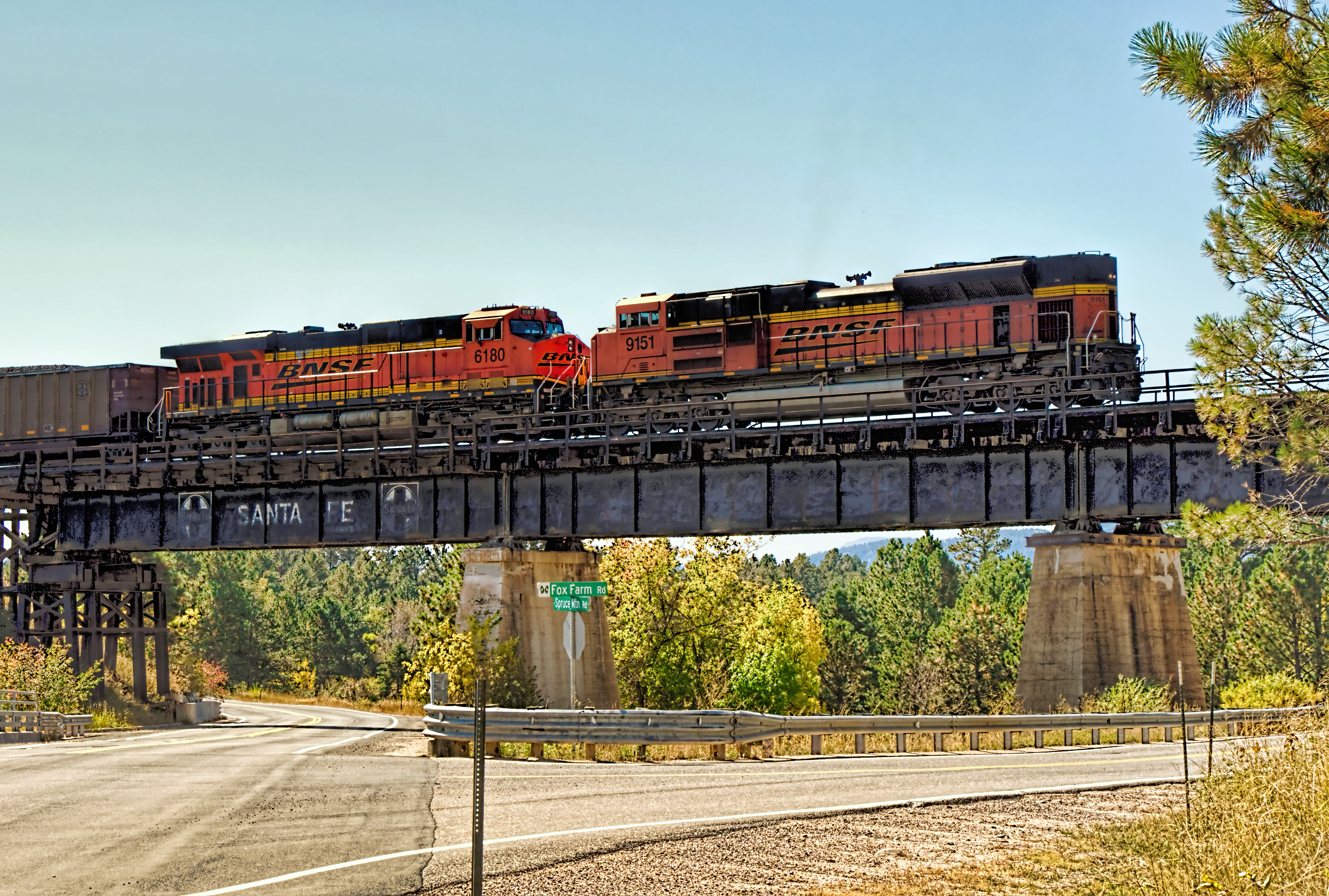
The Santa Fe Bridge in Larkspur, Colorado.

The Colorado Joint Line is a railway corridor in Colorado running north-south between Denver and Pueblo. Presently the tracks are owned by the BNSF Railway and the Union Pacific Railroad and operated jointly. This roughly 120 miles (190 km) of track is on the BNSF Pikes Peak Subdivision and the UP Colorado Springs Subdivision.

== History ==
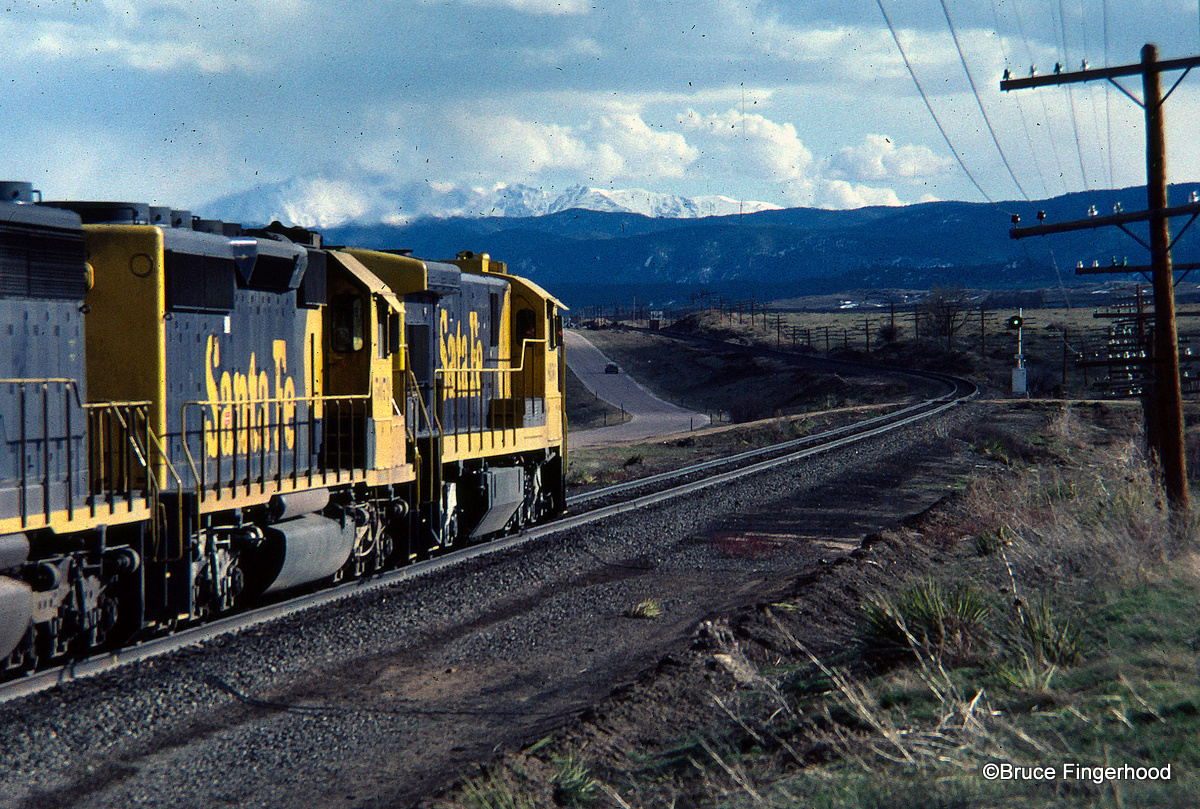
A southbound Santa Fe coal train underneath Pikes Peak, on the Colorado Joint Line out of Denver, April 1983.

The first set of tracks in the area were laid by the Denver and Rio Grande Railroad in 1871, while the Atchison, Topeka and Santa Fe Railway laid their own track parallel to the D&RG in 1887. The Colorado and Southern, seeking a better alternative to its own less efficient route several miles to the east, negotiated a trackage rights agreement to run its trains over the AT&SF line, commencing in 1900. In 1918 during the First World War, the United States Railroad Administration dictated that the parallel D&RG and AT&SF lines be operated as a single double-track railroad, with the eastern track carrying all northbound trains, and the western track carrying all southbound traffic. That efficient arrangement continued after the end of the War and right up to the present day.

== Operation ==
The line consists of the paired right of ways of the two companies, with ownership being non-continuous since the lines originally crossed over each other three times between Denver and Pueblo at Sedalia, Spruce, and Crews. These cross-overs were later eliminated, creating a continuous northbound main track on the east, and southbound track on the west. In 1974 the segment between Palmer Lake and Crews was converted to a bi-directional single track mainline (D&RGW ownership Palmer to Kelker, AT&SF ownership Kelker to Crews).

The Union Pacific, which acquired the D&RGW in 1996, designates the Joint Line as their Colorado Springs Subdivision. The BNSF, which merged the AT&SF and the Burlington Northern, along with its C&S subsidiary, in 1996, designates the route as their Pikes Peak Subdivision. Common traffic over the line largely consists of coal unit trains originating from the Powder River Basin in southeast Montana and northeast Wyoming, however manifest trains are very common as well, and intermodal traffic is not unheard of. Passenger service over the line ended in 1971 with the creation of Amtrak, making it a freight only route.
