= G Line (RTD) =

Commuter rail line in the Denver metropolitan area

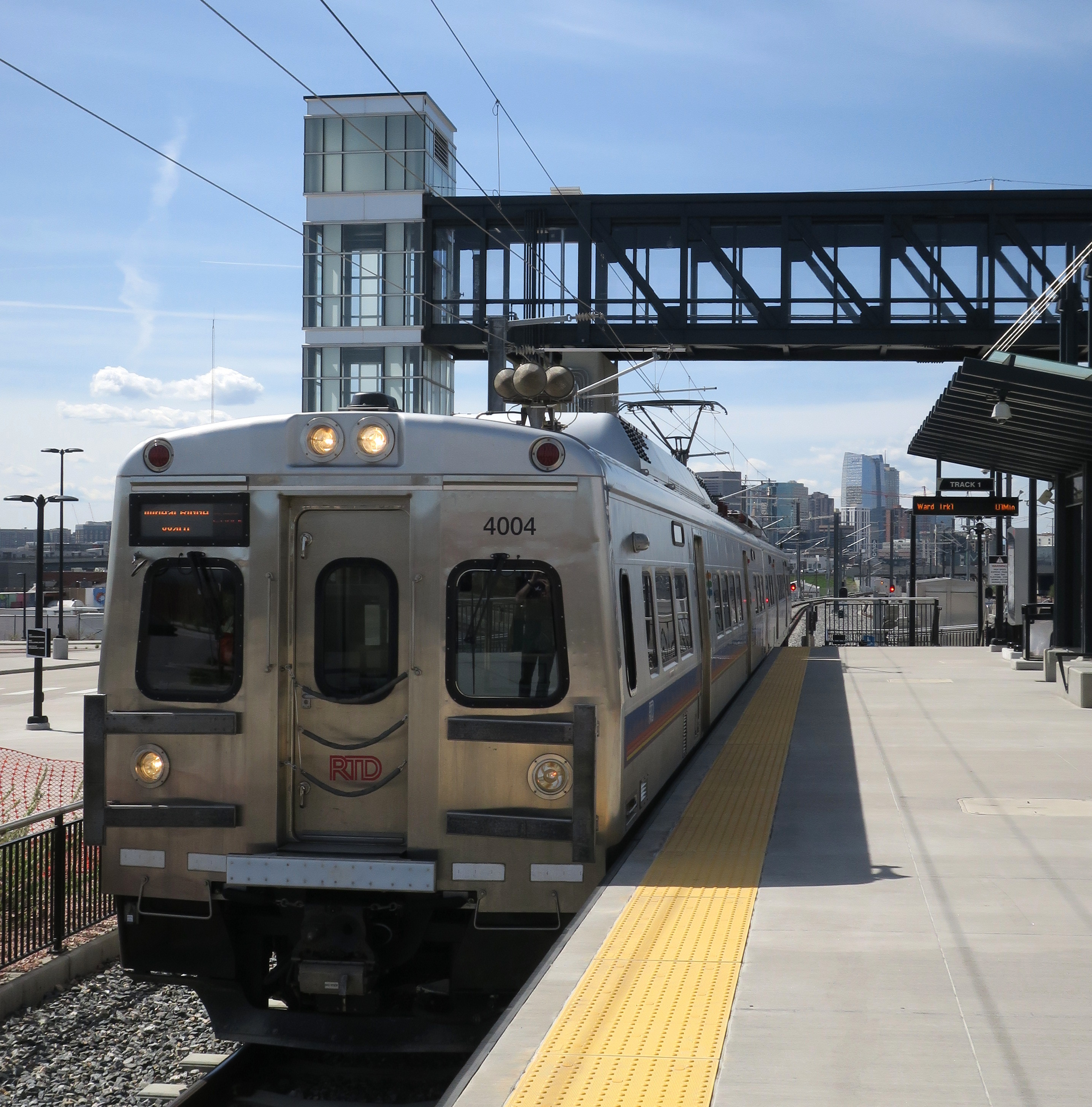
- G Line train at 41st and Fox station

Overview
- Other name: Gold Line
- Owner: Regional Transportation District
- Locale: Denver metropolitan area
- Termini: Wheat Ridge/Ward; Union Station
- Stations: 8
- Website: RTD Denver - G Line

Service
- Type: Commuter rail
- System: RTD Rail
- Operator: Denver Transit Partners
- Ridership: 1,085,000 (FY2023, annual)

History
- Opened: April 26, 2019; 7 years ago

Technical
- Line length: 11.2 mi (18.0 km)
- Track gauge: 4 ft 8 1/2 in (1,435 mm) standard gauge
- Electrification: Overhead line, 25 kV 60 Hz AC
Route map
G Line highlighted in yellow

The G Line is a Regional Transportation District (RTD) commuter rail line that serves stations in Denver, Arvada, and Wheat Ridge, Colorado. The G Line opened on April 26, 2019, is owned by RTD, and is operated by Denver Transit Partners. During planning and construction, it was also known as the Gold Line. It is colored gold on system maps.

The G Line's eastern terminus is at Union Station in downtown Denver, and its western terminus is at Ward Road in Wheat Ridge. Despite the line's letter name and color being a partial reference to the city of Golden, the G Line does not serve it as of 2026.

== Route ==
The G Line departs Union Station on Track 7, sharing a staggered side platform with the B Line on Track 8. It turns north immediately upon leaving Union Station along with the B Line. The two lines travel through the Denver neighborhoods of Sunnyside and Chaffee Park, crossing under Interstate 25 and Interstate 70. A viaduct passing over a large BNSF rail yard brings them to Pecos Junction station, located in an industrial area of North Washington. The B and G Lines split north of the station, with the G Line turning west to follow Interstate 76 and Clear Creek. After crossing Sheridan Boulevard and entering Jefferson County, the G Line briefly reduces to a single track as it enters a more densely developed corridor. Olde Town Arvada station is located along this single track segment, and serves its namesake. The G Line regains a second track after leaving Olde Town Arvada. It runs west through primarily suburban, single-family residential development. The line terminates at Wheat Ridge/Ward station, located approximately one mile northeast of the interchange between I-70 and C-58.

== History ==
Studies had been conducted throughout the 1990s for a rail line that would travel from Union Station to downtown Golden. This corridor would use the former Colorado and Southern Railway line, which ran between Denver and Arvada until 1943. The I-70 to Golden Major Investment Study, conducted in 2000, split the line into two phases: the first phase would run between Denver and Wheat Ridge, and the second phase would complete the line to Golden.

Funding was secured for the first phase in 2004, when voters approved RTD's FasTracks expansion plan. Its name, the "Gold Line," was given in honor of the June 1850 discovery of gold by Georgia prospector Lewis Ralston in Ralston Creek. Ralston's discovery of gold was located only few blocks from the line's route through Arvada. The name also refers to the Pike's Peak gold rush started by Ralston's discovery, and the line's initial western terminus of Golden.

The Gold Line received a Record of Decision approval from the Federal Transit Administration (FTA) in November 2009 allowing the line to be developed. The line was expected to cost $590.5 million at the time of its construction. Groundbreaking occurred on August 31, 2011, at a ceremony in Olde Town Arvada. The then-Secretary of Transportation, Ray LaHood, announced the approval of a $1 billion grant to fund the project at the groundbreaking ceremony.

During construction, its letter name and line color were finalized, which continued the references to Ralston, the gold rush, and Golden. The G Line designation had been previously used by RTD to refer to a light rail line travelling between Aurora and Lone Tree; this line was colored brown on system maps. The light rail G Line ceased operations in 2009. The Aurora-Lone Tree light rail corridor was eventually expanded north, and service was revived on it in 2017 as the R Line.

=== Operational issues and delayed opening ===
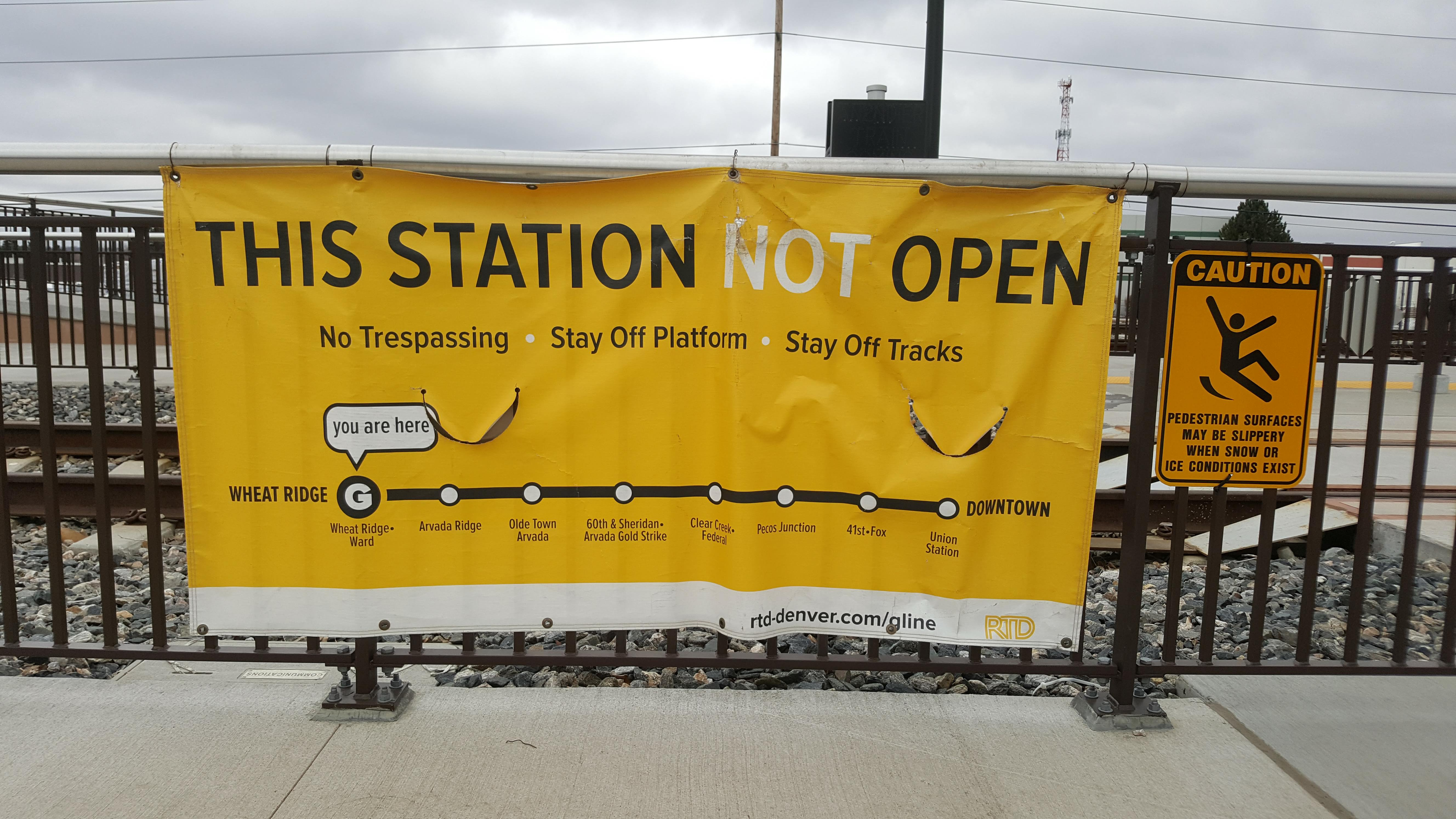
Sign telling that a station is closed.

The G Line was originally scheduled to open in the fall of 2016, shortly after the B Line. However, the A Line encountered major operational issues with its crossing gates shortly after its opening in April 2016. RTD's automated crossing gate system on its commuter rail lines encountered frequent software problems, resulting in issues such as the crossing arms coming down too early and staying down for too long, or not coming down at all as a train approached. The crossing gates eventually had their federal and state approvals revoked in August 2016, resulting in the already-opened A and B Lines relying on flaggers at street-level crossings and the G Line being delayed indefinitely.

Testing along the G Line began in January 2018, after RTD resolved the crossing gate software problems but before the new software was approved by the Federal Railroad Administration (FRA). Given this, the line used flaggers during its testing. The state's Public Utilities Commission eventually approved the new automated gates in March 2018, followed by the FRA in June 2018. At that time, RTD announced that the G Line would begin operations in early 2019. RTD subsequently announced on April 1, 2019 that the G Line would open on April 26. The line began service between downtown Denver and Wheat Ridge on that date, without flaggers and with FRA-approved quiet zones in place.

=== Rolling stock ===
The G Line uses Hyundai Rotem Silverliner V railcars, originally designed and built for the Southeastern Pennsylvania Transportation Authority (SEPTA). RTD is the only agency that operates these vehicles outside of the Philadelphia metropolitan area.

=== Possible extension to Golden ===
Though FasTracks only funded and provisioned for the G Line's current service, RTD owns the rail right-of-way between Wheat Ridge/Ward station and Ford Street in Golden. When originally conceived of in the 1990s, the line's western terminus was intended to be in downtown Golden. The station's location was proposed to be site of the former CoorsTek facility on 9th Street; plans also included an intermediate station at McIntyre Street in Wheat Ridge. However, when FasTracks was approved by voters in 2004, funding was only provided as far west as Ward Road due to concerns over the line's cost-effectiveness if constructed to Golden. Furthermore, when the right-of-way was sold to RTD by BNSF, it included a clause for the right to use the segment west of Ward Road in perpetuity. As such, RTD has no plans or funding to extend the G Line west to Golden as of 2026. Service to downtown Golden is instead provided via a bus connection from Oak station on the W Line.

Proposals for a Golden extension have also included a "loop" through downtown Golden, following the US 6 freeway southeast. This would involve the construction of a station at 19th Street, serving the Colorado School of Mines, and bring the line to a "western" terminus at Jeffco Government Center-Golden station. As of 2026, there are no plans or funding for the construction of this loop, nor are there plans to extend the W Line along the same route.

== Stations ==
Station	Municipality	Opened	Major connections & notes
Downtown Golden	Golden	—N/a	
Wheat Ridge/McIntyre	Wheat Ridge	—N/a	
Wheat Ridge/Ward	Wheat Ridge	April 26, 2019	Park and ride: 290 spaces
Arvada Ridge	Arvada	April 26, 2019	Park and ride: 200 spaces
Olde Town Arvada	Arvada	April 26, 2019	Park and ride: 600 spaces
60th & Sheridan/Arvada Gold Strike	Arvada	April 26, 2019	Park and ride: 330 spaces
Clear Creek/Federal	Arvada	April 26, 2019	Park and ride: 280 spaces
Pecos Junction	Denver	April 26, 2019	Park and ride: 300 spaces
41st & Fox	Denver	April 26, 2019	Park and ride: 500 spaces
Union Station	Denver	April 22, 2016	California Zephyr; 16th Street FreeRide
