= Clear Creek/Federal station =

Commuter rail station in Arvada, Colorado

Clear Creek•Federal
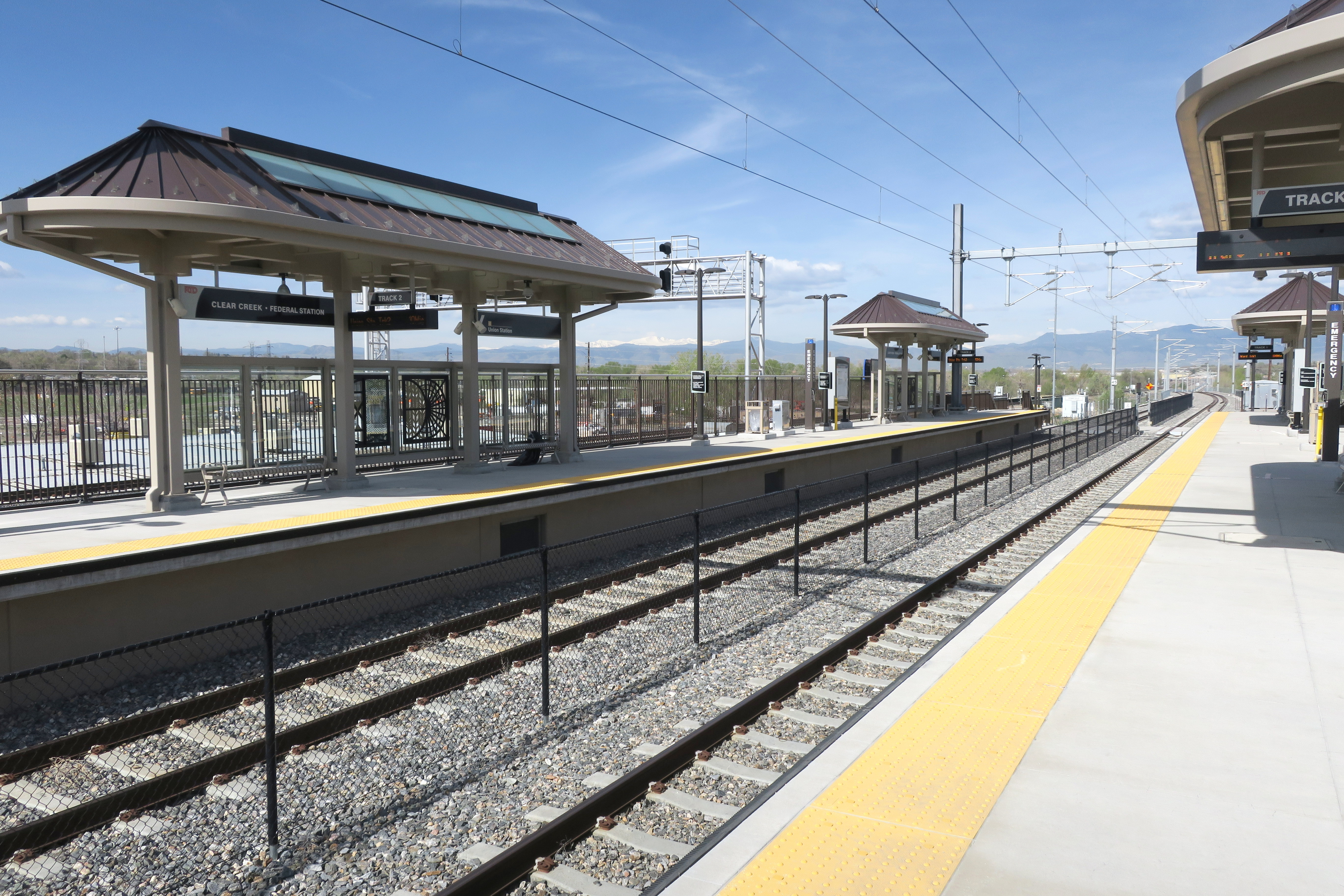
- Clear Creek/Federal commuter rail station platform

General information
- Location: 2870 West 60th Avenue; Arvada, Colorado
- Coordinates: 39°48′14″N 105°01′24″W
- Owner: Regional Transportation District
- Line: Gold Line
- Platforms: 2 side platforms
- Tracks: 2
- Connections: RTD Bus: 31

Construction
- Structure type: At-grade
- Parking: 280 spaces
- Accessible: Yes

Other information
- Fare zone: Local

History
- Opened: April 26, 2019

Passengers
- 2025: 347 (average daily)
- Rank: 65 out of 75

Services
Preceding station	RTD	Following station
60th & Sheridan/Arvada Gold Strike toward Wheat Ridge/Ward	G Line	Pecos Junction toward Union Station
Location

Clear Creek/Federal station (sometimes stylized as Clear Creek•Federal) is a Regional Transportation District (RTD) commuter rail station on the G Line, near Arvada, Colorado. The station opened on April 26, 2019, along with the rest of the G Line.

== Station layout ==
1F

Platform Level

West 60th Avenue; bus bays; parking
Side platform, doors will open on the right
Westbound
← toward Wheat Ridge/Ward (60th & Sheridan/Arvada Gold Strike)
Eastbound
toward Union Station (Pecos Junction) →
Side platform, doors will open on the right
Amtrak/BNSF corridor

The station is situated on an embanked section of track between Federal Boulevard and Interstate 76, in the unincorporated Berkley area of Adams County but with an Arvada postal address. It features includes three bus bays and a 280-space park-and-ride facility.

The land surrounding the station is entirely undeveloped save for a gravel supplier and various warehouses. During its planning, Adams County officials preferred a location the west side of Federal Boulevard to benefit a real estate developer. RTD's preferred east location (the eventual site of the station) required industrial cleanup but was hoped to kickstart revitalization of the area. As of 2026, efforts to develop around the station have not come to fruition.

The station features the largest piece of public art to be commissioned by RTD: Addison Karl's 374-foot-long (114 m) hand-painted mural "Doradus", along the embanked wall.
