= Pecos Junction station =

Commuter rail station in North Washington, Colorado

Pecos Junction
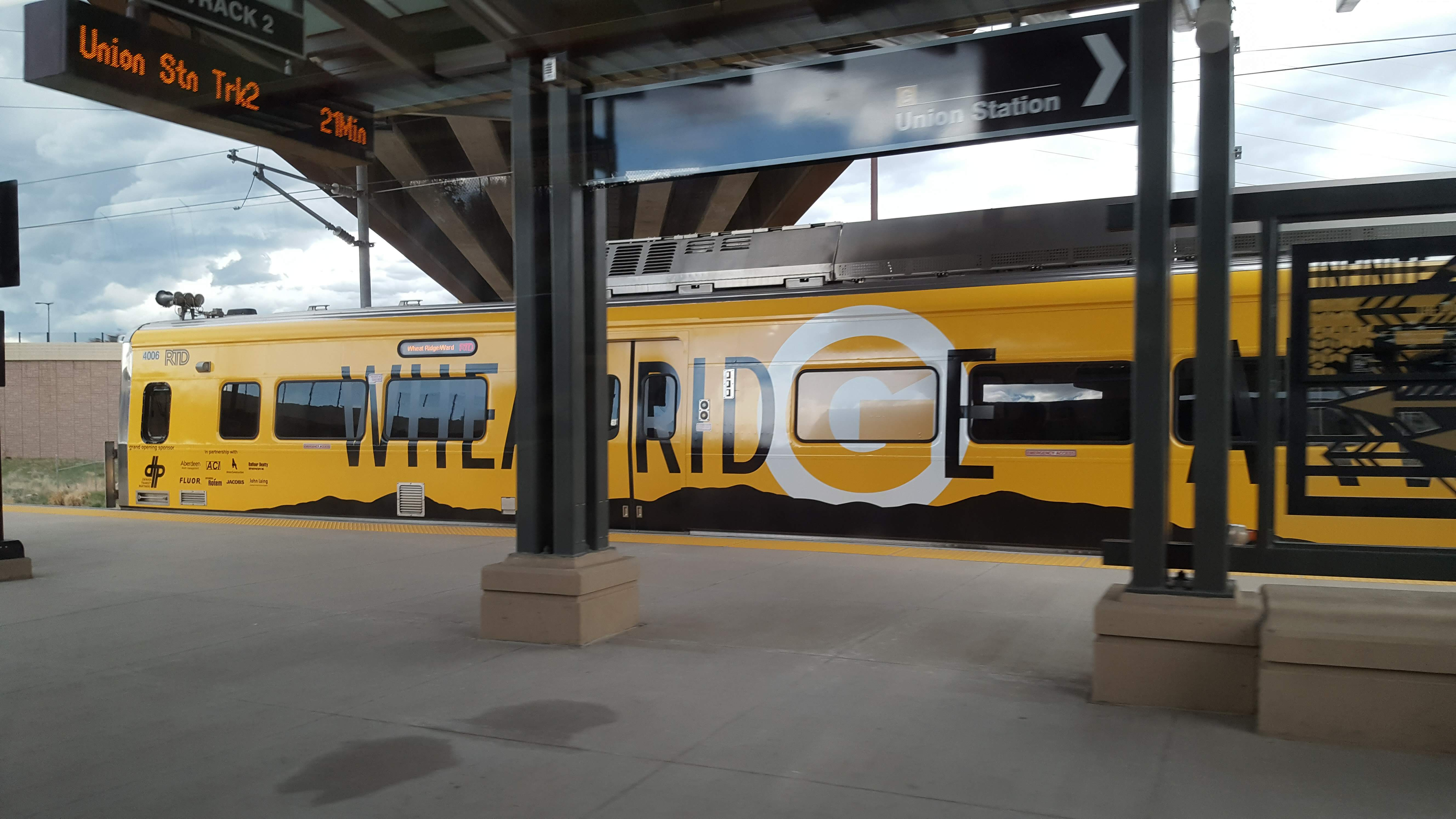
- Train at the platform on opening day

General information
- Location: 6096 Pecos Street; Denver, Colorado
- Coordinates: 39.8051°N 105.0051°W
- Owner: Regional Transportation District
- Line: Northwest Corridor
- Platforms: 1 island platform
- Tracks: 2
- Connections: RTD Bus: 19

Construction
- Structure type: At-grade
- Parking: 300 spaces
- Accessible: Yes

History
- Opened: April 26, 2019

Passengers
- 2025: 260 (average daily)
- Rank: 68 out of 75

Services
Preceding station	RTD	Following station
Westminster Terminus	B Line	41st & Fox toward Union Station
Clear Creek/Federal toward Wheat Ridge/Ward	G Line	41st & Fox toward Union Station
Location

Pecos Junction station is a Regional Transportation District (RTD) commuter rail station on the B and G Lines near Denver, Colorado. The station opened on April 26, 2019, along with the rest of the G Line.

Between the start of its service in 2016 and the station's opening in 2019, B Line trains passed through Pecos Junction on a single track but did not stop.

== Station layout ==
2F
Pedestrian bridge
1F

Platform Level

West 62nd Parkway; bus bays; parking
Outbound
← toward Westminster (Terminus)
← toward Wheat Ridge/Ward (Clear Creek/Federal)
Island platform, doors will open on the left
Inbound
toward Union Station (41st & Fox) →

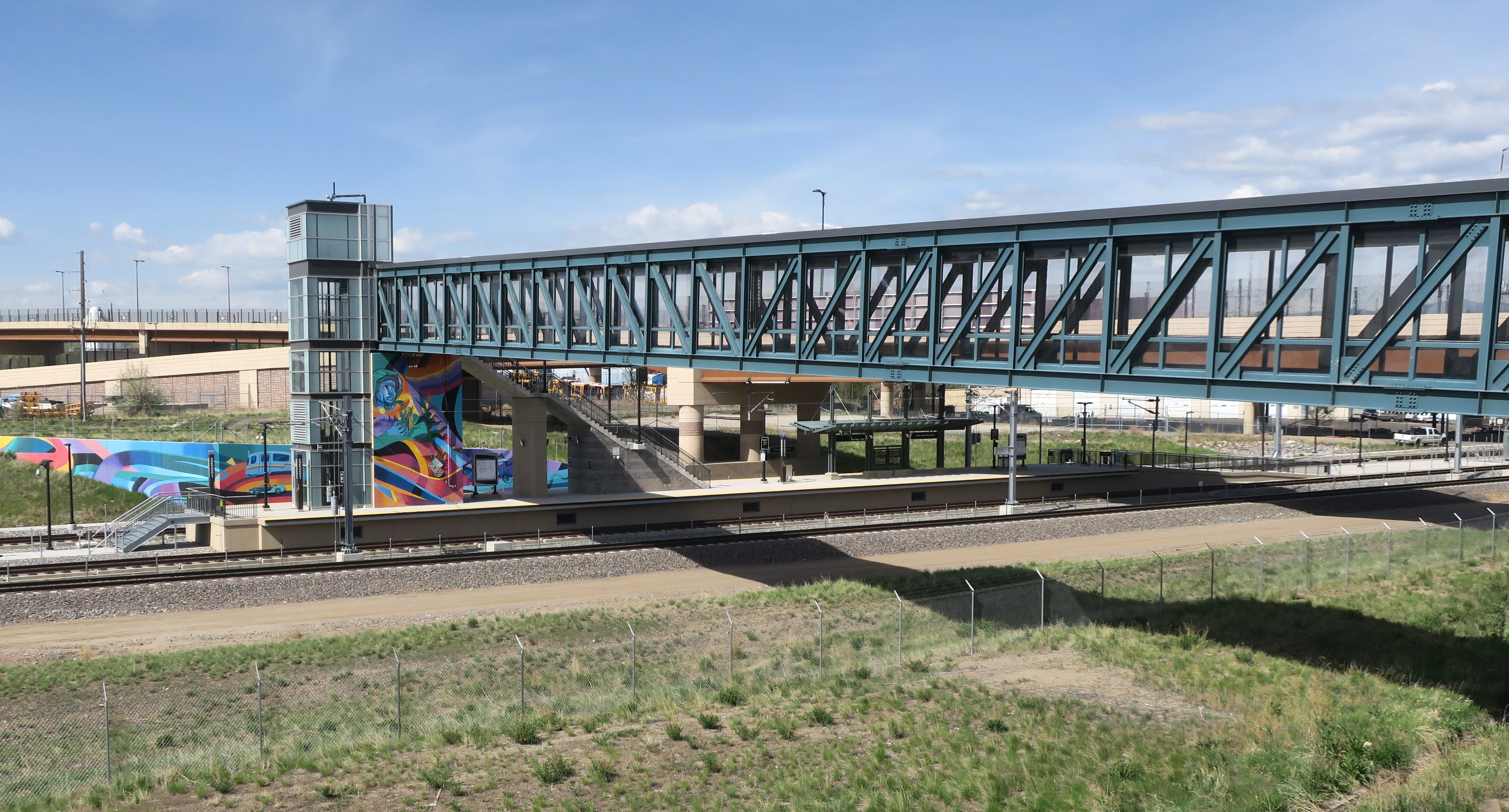
View of the island platform and pedestrian bridge at the station

The station is located east of Pecos Street along West 62nd Avenue, in the unincorporated community of North Washington but with a Denver postal address. It consists of an island platform connected by a pedestrian bridge to a 300-space park-and-ride lot. Pecos Street runs elevated west of the station and is inaccessible to pedestrians.

The land surrounding the station consists of warehouses and other industrial facilities. Adams County completed a study in 2009 with the goal of developing the land around Pecos Junction with transit-oriented development and park space to connect to Clear Creek. As of 2026, this development has not yet begun construction.

Pecos Junction is the least-used station on both the B and G Lines, and also in the commuter rail network as a whole. It has an average daily passenger count of 260. This is largely due to the lack of development of, and accessibility to, the land surrounding the station. It also carries the dubious distinction of being a transfer point with no reason to transfer. Both lines travel to Union Station inbound, and the B Line currently terminates a short distance north at Westminster station outbound.
