= 41st & Fox station =

Commuter rail station in Denver, Colorado

41st•Fox
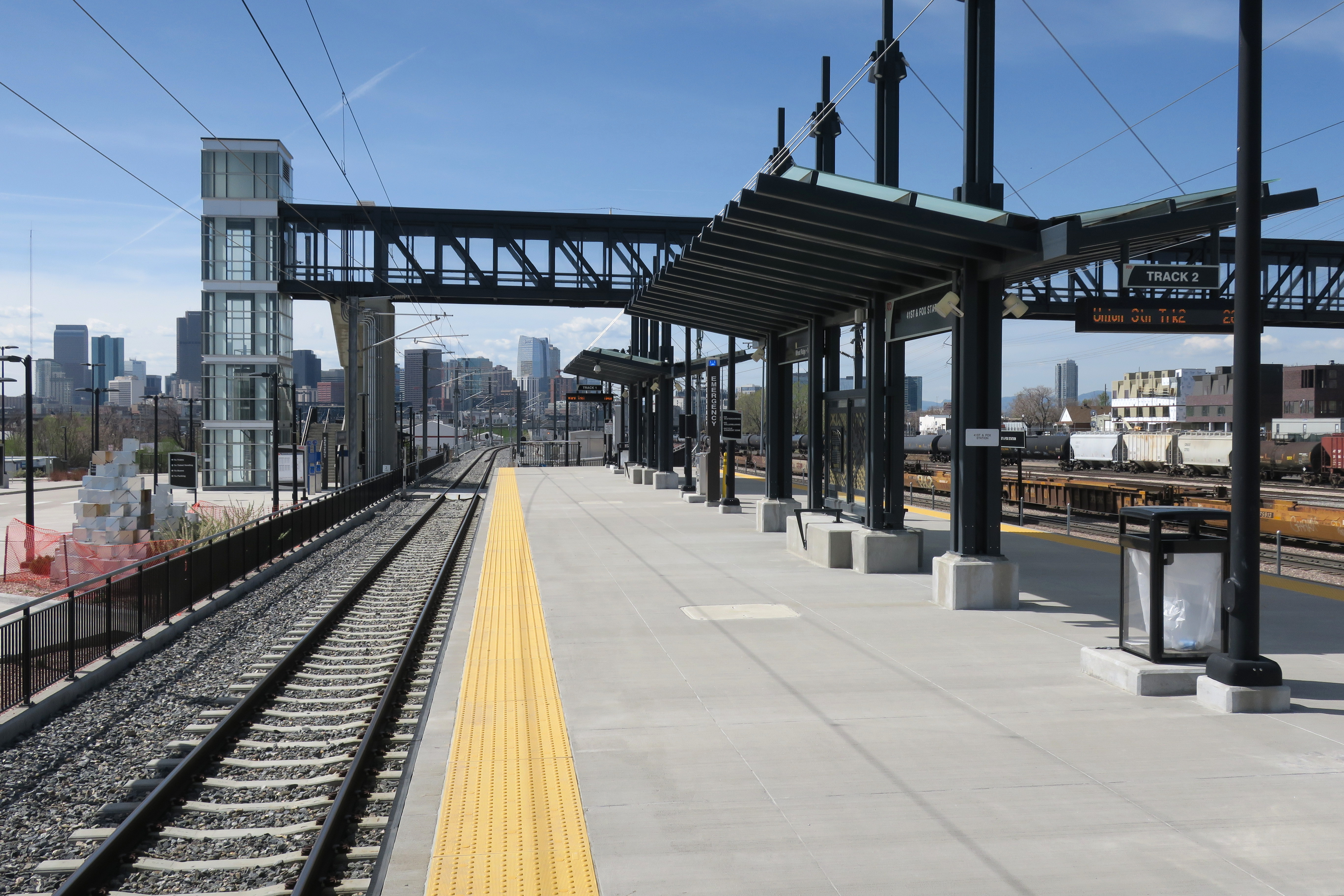
- 41st & Fox station

General information
- Location: 4105 North Fox Street; Denver, Colorado
- Coordinates: 39°46′23″N 104°59′48″W
- Owner: Regional Transportation District
- Line: Northwest Corridor
- Platforms: 1 island platform
- Tracks: 2

Construction
- Structure type: At-grade
- Parking: 500 spaces
- Accessible: Yes

History
- Opened: April 26, 2019

Passengers
- 2025: 533 (average daily)
- Rank: 56 out of 75

Services
| Preceding station | RTD | Following station |
|---|---|---|
| Pecos Junction toward Westminster | B Line | Union Station Terminus |
| Pecos Junction toward Wheat Ridge/Ward | G Line | Union Station Terminus |
Location

41st & Fox station (sometimes stylized as 41st•Fox) is a Regional Transportation District (RTD) commuter rail station on the B and G Lines near Denver, Colorado. The station opened on April 26, 2019, along with the rest of the G Line.

Between the start of its service in 2016 and the station's opening in 2019, B Line trains passed through 41st & Fox on a single track but did not stop.

== Station layout ==
2F
Pedestrian bridge
1F

Platform Level

Fox Street; parking
Outbound
← toward Westminster (Pecos Junction)
← toward Wheat Ridge/Ward (Pecos Junction)
Island platform, doors will open on the left
Inbound
toward Union Station (Terminus) →
Amtrak/BNSF corridor
Inca Street

41st & Fox station is located in the Globeville neighborhood of Denver, and is the only station on the B and G Lines located in the city (Pecos Junction station has a Denver postal address, but is located in unincorporated Adams County). It and the industrial development to its east are physically cut off from the rest of Globeville by Interstate 25. The station features a 500-space park-and-ride lot and a pedestrian bridge that links it to apartments and single-family residences in the Sunnyside neighborhood. The area west of the station in Sunnyside has been the primary site of transit-oriented development, though additional projects are underway on the Globeville side as of 2026.

Despite having bus bays, there are no bus connections from this station.
