= B Line (RTD) =

Commuter rail line in the Denver metropolitan area

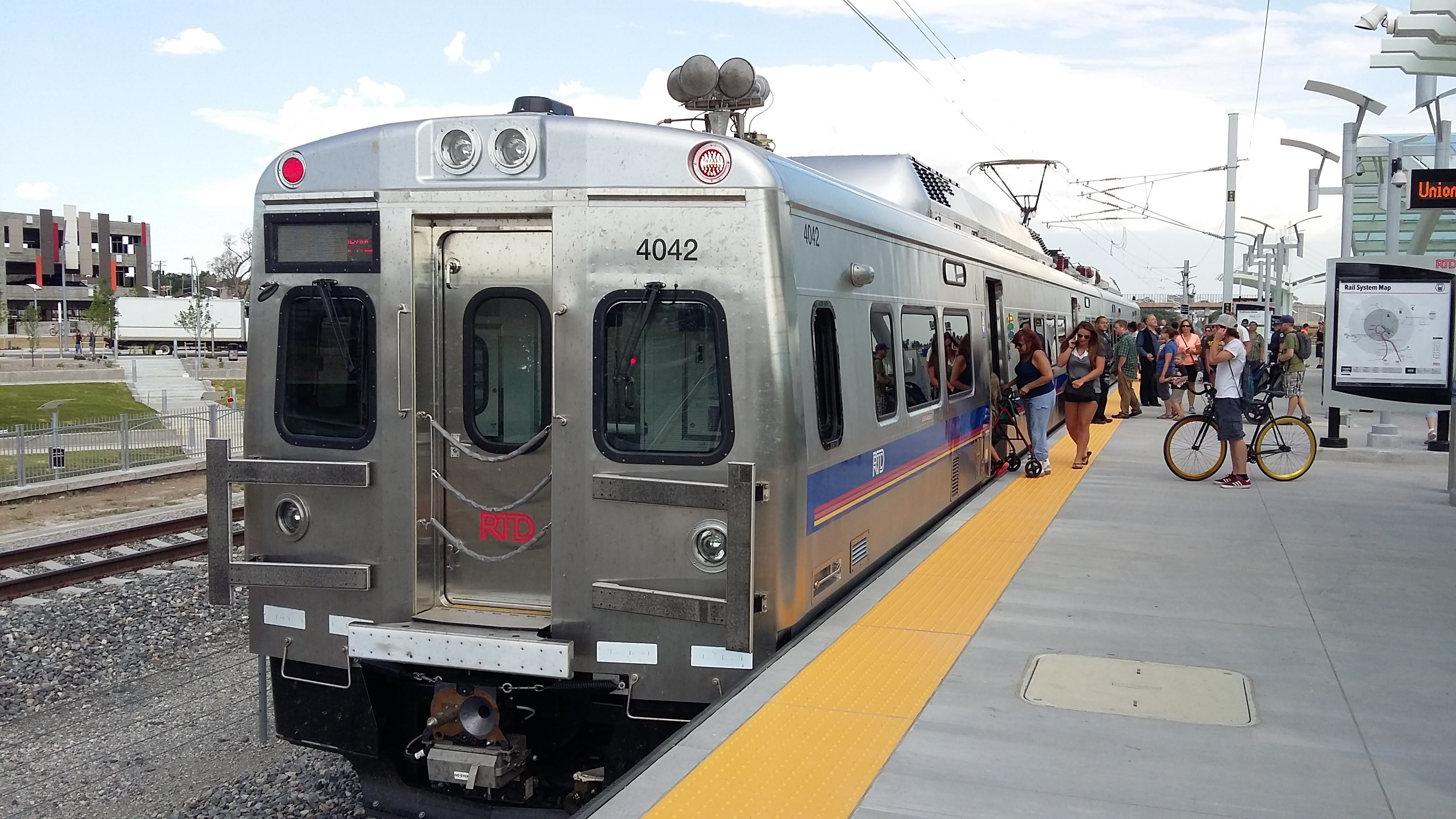
- B Line train at Westminster Station

Overview
- Other name: Northwest Line
- Owner: Regional Transportation District
- Locale: Denver metropolitan area
- Termini: Westminster; Union Station
- Stations: 4

Service
- Type: Commuter rail
- System: RTD Rail
- Operator: Denver Transit Partners
- Ridership: 157,000 (FY2023, annual)

History
- Opened: July 25, 2016; 10 years ago

Technical
- Line length: 6.2 mi (10.0 km)
- Track gauge: 4 ft 8 1/2 in (1,435 mm) standard gauge
- Electrification: Overhead line, 25 kV 60 Hz AC
Route map
B Line highlighted in green

The B Line is a Regional Transportation District (RTD) commuter rail line that serves stations in Denver and Westminster, Colorado. The B Line opened on July 25, 2016, is owned by RTD, and is operated by Denver Transit Partners. During planning and construction, it was also known as the Northwest Line. It is colored green on system maps.

The B Line's southern terminus is at Union Station in downtown Denver, and its northern terminus is at Westminster station in southern Westminster. This segment is only the first 6 miles of a planned 41-mile corridor that would connect Denver, Boulder, and Longmont. Though the entire length of the B Line was provisioned for in the 2004 FasTracks initiative, it is not currently funded and as of 2026, is not expected to be built out until at least 2042.

== Route ==
The B Line departs Union Station on Track 8, sharing a staggered side platform with the G Line on Track 7. It turns north immediately upon leaving Union Station along with the G Line. The two lines travel through the Denver neighborhoods of Sunnyside and Chaffee Park, crossing under Interstate 25 and Interstate 70. A viaduct passing over a large BNSF rail yard brings them to Pecos Junction station, located in an industrial area of North Washington. The B and G Lines split north of the station, with the B Line crossing under Interstate 76 on a single-track right-of-way. The B Line terminates at Westminster station shortly after.

If fully constructed, the B Line would continue northwest from Westminster, following a BNSF corridor. A second station in Westminster, located in its downtown district, is planned at the corridor's intersection with West 88th Avenue. Two stations are planned in Broomfield along the corridor, one at the corridor's intersection with West 116th Avenue and another at the existing US-36 & Flatiron bus rapid transit station. The corridor continues north to Louisville, where a station is planned in the downtown area, before turning sharply west. A station is planned for Boulder Junction at the corridor's intersection with Pearl Street in Boulder, with onward connections to the University of Colorado and other points of interest. Finally, the corridor would continue northeast, paralleling the Diagonal Highway (C-119) to its terminus in downtown Longmont.

== History ==
Studies and civil planners had long proposed a direct rail link between Denver and Boulder, and in 2004 voters approved FasTracks, a multi-billion dollar public transportation expansion plan. This plan provisioned a rail service from Denver to Longmont via Boulder, which eventually became known as the Northwest Line. It was the last of the FasTracks expansion projects to enter its planning and construction phase, and by that time the Great Recession had already begun to impact the project. The downturn in the economy, poor cost projections that significantly underestimated construction costs, and other factors led to the initiation of the year-long Northwest Area Mobility Study. The study concluded in 2014, and led to a very different service pattern and construction schedule than what was originally voted on ten years prior.

Construction began on the new first phase of the Northwest Line between Denver and Westminster that year, as a part of the Eagle P3 project. The remainder of the line to Longmont was delayed indefinitely as it would require additional funding to be completed. This announcement angered voters in Denver's northwest suburbs who had approved the FasTracks project in 2004 but were now informed that their tax increase would not cover the construction of the line. Nonetheless, the B Line opened on July 25, 2016, and was the second RTD commuter rail line to enter service.

=== Operational issues ===
When the A Line opened in April 2016, it encountered frequent issues with its crossing gates due to software problems. Crossing arms often came down too early or stayed down for too long; other times, they would not come down at all as a train approached. The B Line used the same crossing arm software as the A Line, and this resulted in similar operational problems. The B Line's issues were not as publicized as the A Line's due to its shorter route and lower ridership. Nonetheless, the Federal Railroad Administration (FRA) mandated flaggers along the B Line as a safety precaution after the crossing arms' federal and state approval was revoked. The G Line, which was supposed to open shortly after the B Line, was delayed indefinitely until the crossing arms were fixed. The crossing arms eventually received federal approval in 2018, and the flaggers were removed in early 2019.

The B Line's frequency was reduced to hourly in 2020, due to its low ridership and the onset of the COVID-19 pandemic. Its initial half-hour frequency was not restored until an RTD service change in June 2026.

=== Northwest Rail Peak Service Plan ===
In 2018, the US 36 Mayors and Commissioners Coalition asked RTD to provide an estimate for weekday rush hour commuter rail service along the original corridor to Longmont. In spring 2019, Longmont City Council asked RTD to look into a barebones "Peak Service Plan." RTD estimated a start-up cost of $117 million, serving an initial weekday ridership of 1,400. By mid-2019, completion of the full original line was estimated at $1.1 billion. The service's opening date was targeted for 2042, 25 years after its original planned opening to Longmont. In early 2020, RTD estimated it could construct the rest of the line for peak-direction service at a cost of $700–800 million; full-day service would not be expected until 2050 at a final cost of $1.5 billion.

A second Peak Service Plan, initiated in 2022 and concluded in 2024, was an analysis of what a minimum service to Longmont could look like, as an interim step until the line is fully built out as provisioned in FasTracks. The study affirmed the originally planned six stops past the current Westminster terminus, serviced by three southbound morning trips and three northbound evening trips.

In contrast to the rest of the RTD commuter system, this minimum service would operate on shared track with BNSF freight trains, and rely on new and existing sidings for holding freight while commuter trains are passing. This shared extension would notably use diesel locomotives instead of overhead electrification, and would continue to do so until the corridor was electrified at a later date.

=== Rolling stock ===
The B Line uses Hyundai Rotem Silverliner V railcars, originally designed and built for the Southeastern Pennsylvania Transportation Authority (SEPTA). RTD is the only agency that operates these vehicles outside of the Philadelphia metropolitan area.

=== Potential suspension ===
In late 2026, RTD began a review of proposals for rail and bus service cuts in order to close a $215 million shortfall. In each proposal, the B Line would be suspended until it is extended to at least Boulder. In addition, Westminster, the only station exclusive to the B Line, would be closed. Ridership along the B Line, already low before the pandemic, has declined by 74% since its 2019 peak. In addition, none of the stations along the line have seen significant transit-oriented development. Westminster officials have criticized RTD's proposals to suspend service on the B Line, saying that service cuts would be "unthinkable" and "completely untenable" for the community.

== Stations ==
Station	Municipality	Opened	Major connections & notes
Longmont	Longmont	—N/a	
Boulder Junction	Boulder	—N/a	
Louisville	Louisville	—N/a	
Flatiron	Broomfield	—N/a	
Broomfield/116th	Broomfield	—N/a	
Downtown Westminster	Westminster	—N/a	
Westminster	Westminster	July 25, 2016	Park and ride: 136 spaces
Pecos Junction	Denver	April 26, 2019	Park and ride: 300 spaces
41st & Fox	Denver	April 26, 2019	Park and ride: 500 spaces
Union Station	Denver	April 22, 2016	California Zephyr; 16th Street FreeRide

If fully built out, the B Line would connect to the proposed Colorado Connector (CoCo) intercity rail service at Union Station, Downtown Westminster, Broomfield/116th, Louisville, Boulder Junction, and Longmont.
