= 60th & Sheridan/Arvada Gold Strike station =

Commuter rail station in Arvada, Colorado

60th & Sheridan•Arvada Gold Strike
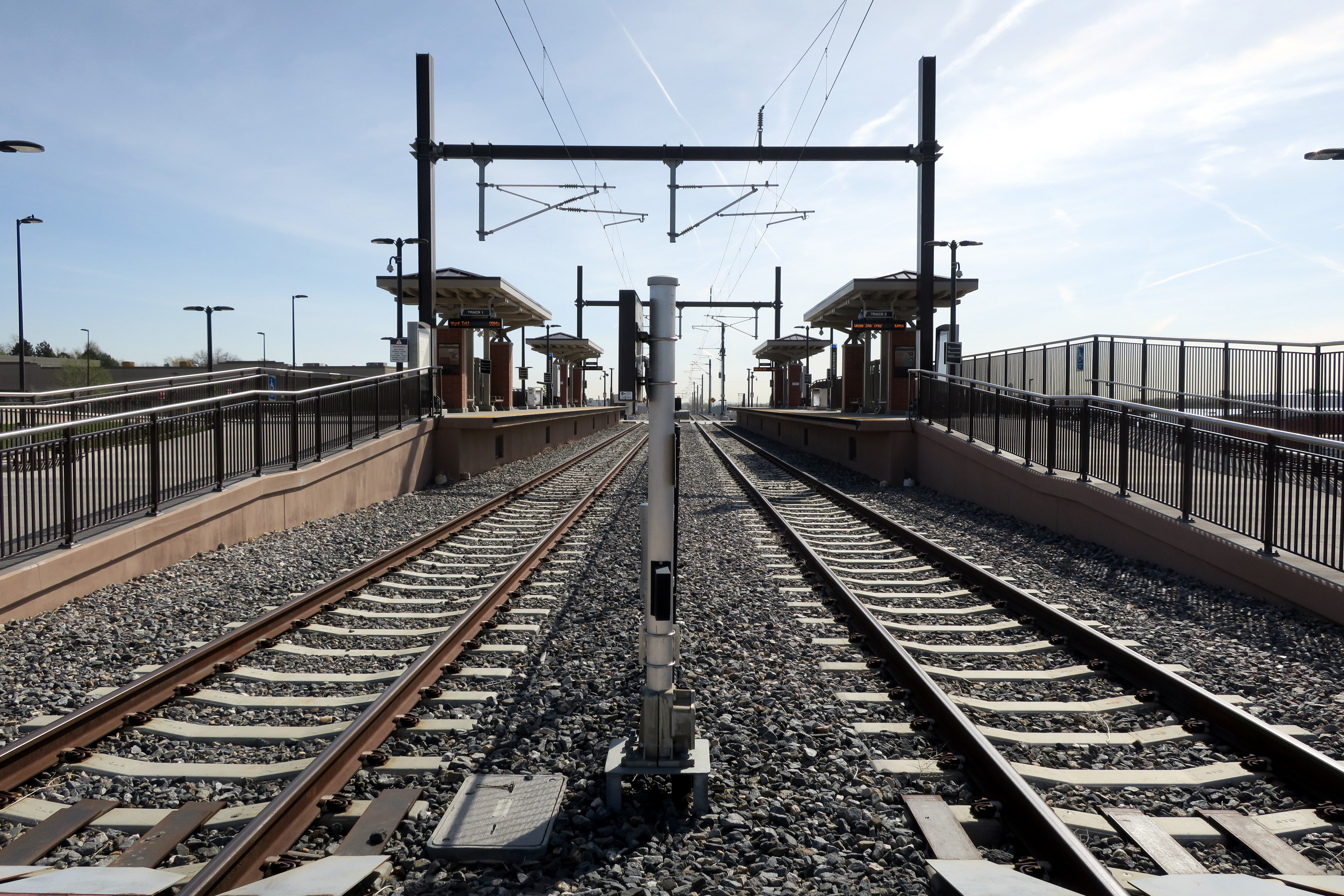
- 60th & Sheridan–Arvada Gold Strike station platforms

General information
- Location: 5980 Sheridan Boulevard; Arvada, Colorado
- Coordinates: 39.8037°N 105.0492°W
- Owner: Regional Transportation District
- Line: Gold Line
- Platforms: 2 side platforms
- Tracks: 2
- Connections: RTD Bus: 51

Construction
- Structure type: At-grade
- Parking: 330 spaces
- Accessible: Yes

Other information
- Fare zone: Local

History
- Opened: April 26, 2019

Passengers
- 2025: 503 (average daily)
- Rank: 59 out of 75

Services
Preceding station	RTD	Following station
Olde Town Arvada toward Wheat Ridge/Ward	G Line	Clear Creek/Federal toward Union Station
Location

60th & Sheridan–Arvada Gold Strike station (sometimes stylized as 60th & Sheridan•Arvada Gold Strike) is a Regional Transportation District (RTD) commuter rail station on the G Line in Arvada, Colorado. The station opened on April 26, 2019, along with the rest of the G Line.

== Station layout ==
1F

Platform Level

West 60th Avenue; bus bays; parking
Side platform, doors will open on the right
Westbound
← toward Wheat Ridge/Ward (Olde Town Arvada)
Eastbound
toward Union Station (Clear Creek/Federal) →
Side platform, doors will open on the right
Amtrak/BNSF corridor

60th & Sheridan/Arvada Gold Strike station is located east of Sheridan Boulevard, which runs elevated over the station's tracks. Access to the station is via West 60th Avenue, a short distance north. The land surrounding the station consists of warehouses and industrial buildings; unlike the other two stations located in Arvada, there is no transit-oriented development.

This is the last point westbound that the G Line shares a right-of-way with Amtrak, which runs its California Zephyr service adjacent to (but not stopping at) the station. RTD trains diverge towards Wheat Ridge on a flyover after passing under Sheridan Boulevard.

The public art chosen for the station is "Gold Pour" by Aaron T. Stephan and commemorates the first documented gold strike in Colorado at the nearby confluence of Ralston and Clear Creeks. The artwork features shimmering gold made of glass and mosaic tiles that appear to pour over the station's wall.
