= Olde Town Arvada station =

Commuter rail station in Arvada, Colorado

Olde Town Arvada
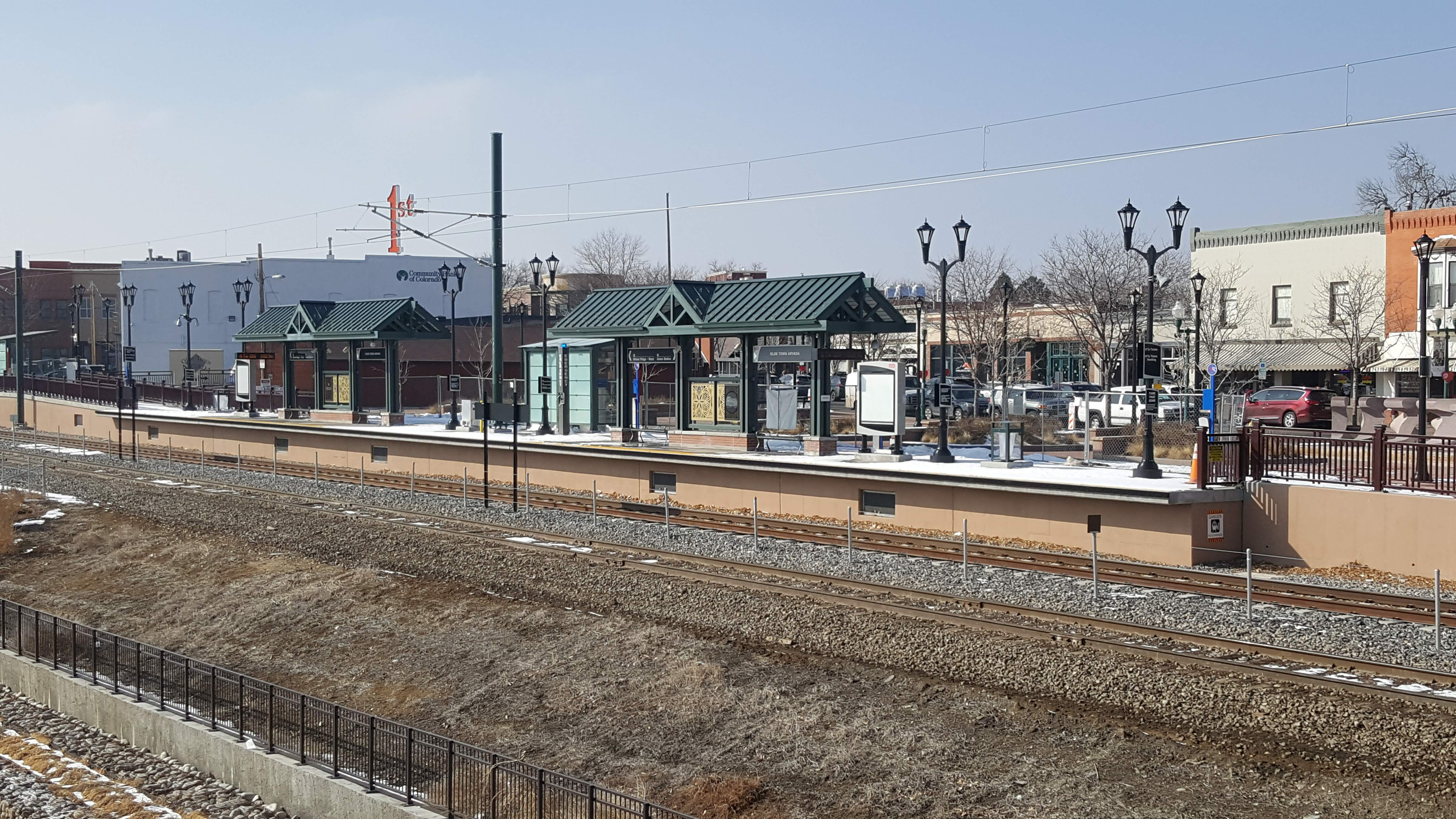
- Olde Town Arvada commuter rail station as seen from the parking garage

General information
- Location: 5575 Vance Street; Arvada, Colorado
- Coordinates: 39.7990°N 105.0803°W
- Owner: Regional Transportation District
- Line: Gold Line
- Platforms: 1 side platform
- Tracks: 1
- Connections: RTD Bus: 28, 32, 52, 72, 76, 80

Construction
- Structure type: At-grade
- Parking: 600 spaces
- Accessible: Yes

Other information
- Fare zone: Local

History
- Opened: April 26, 2019

Passengers
- 2025: 1,281 (average daily)
- Rank: 31 out of 75

Services
Preceding station	RTD	Following station
Arvada Ridge toward Wheat Ridge/Ward	G Line	60th & Sheridan/Arvada Gold Strike toward Union Station
Location

Olde Town Arvada station is a Regional Transportation District (RTD) commuter rail station on the G Line in Arvada, Colorado. The station opened on April 26, 2019, along with the rest of the G Line.

The station serves Olde Town Arvada, which contains numerous shops, restaurants, and apartments. The district is listed on the National Register of Historic Places and sits across the street from the platform. With an average of nearly 1,300 passengers per day, Olde Town Arvada is the second-busiest station on the G Line (after Union Station).

== Station layout ==
4F

Platform Level

Grandview Avenue; Olde Town Arvada
Side platform, doors will open on the left or right
← toward Wheat Ridge/Ward (Arvada Ridge) or toward Union Station (60th & Sheridan/Arvada Gold Strike) →
Parking garage
3F
Parking garage
2F
Parking garage
1F
Bus bays; parking garage; entrance from Vance Street

Olde Town Arvada station features 600 parking spaces in a 4-level parking garage, shared with local businesses. The land surrounding the station is densely developed on all sides. The area's density required the station to be built with a single platform and for the G Line to narrow to a single track. It returns to a double-track right-of-way soon after leaving the station in both directions.

The station's bus bays are located on the first floor of the parking garage. Passengers making a bus connection must cross the G Line track at either Vance Street or Olde Wadsworth Boulevard, walk onto the top floor of the parking garage, and then take stairs or an elevator down. The same trip is required in reverse for passengers arriving from a bus connection.

The public art chosen for the station is "Track Bone" by Frank Swanson. It reflects how the railroad was in many ways the backbone of Arvada when it was founded in 1870. The sculpture is made of Red Colorado Granite cut into sections of railroad track and is 28 feet (8.5 m) long, 4 feet 6 inches (1.37 m) high, and 7 feet (2.1 m) wide.
