= Westminster station (RTD) =

Commuter rail station in Westminster, Colorado

Westminster
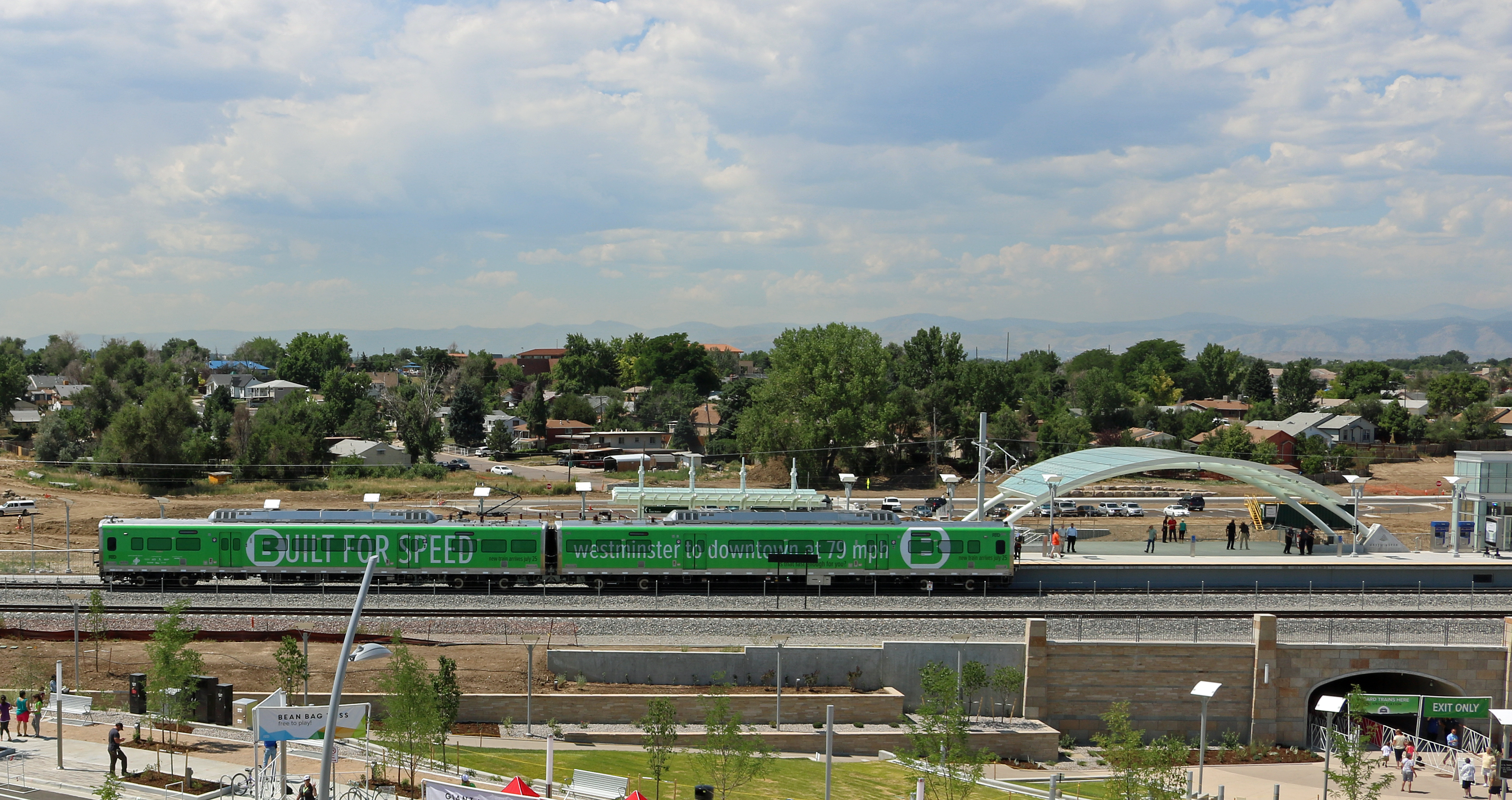
- Westminster station on opening day

General information
- Location: 3200 Westminster Station Drive; Westminster, Colorado
- Coordinates: 39°49′22″N 105°01′45″W
- Owner: Regional Transportation District
- Line: Northwest Corridor
- Platforms: 1 side platform
- Tracks: 1
- Connections: RTD Bus: 31, 72

Construction
- Structure type: At-grade
- Parking: 136 spaces
- Cycle facilities: 20 racks, 18 lockers
- Accessible: Yes

History
- Opened: July 25, 2016

Passengers
- 2025: 356 (average daily)
- Rank: 64 out of 75

Services
Preceding station	RTD	Following station
Terminus	B Line	Pecos Junction toward Union Station
Future services
Preceding station	RTD	Following station
Downtown Westminster toward Longmont	B Line Future extension	Pecos Junction toward Union Station
Location

Westminster station is a Regional Transportation District (RTD) commuter rail station on the B Line in Westminster, Colorado. The station opened on July 25, 2016, along with the B Line, and serves as its northern terminus.

From Westminster, B Line trains travel 6 miles (9.7 km) south to Union Station in Denver. This journey takes approximately 15 minutes.

== Station layout ==
1F

Platform Level

Westminster Station Drive; bus bays; parking garage
BNSF corridor
Southbound
toward Union Station (Pecos Junction) →
Side platform, doors will open on the left
Creekside Drive; additional parking
B1
Pedestrian tunnel

Westminster station is located a short distance west of Federal Boulevard, south of West 72nd Avenue. It consists of a single platform, serving the B Line's single track. A 1,000-space parking garage, the station's bus bays, and a public plaza are located across a BNSF right-of-way from the platform on its north side, and are connected to the station by a pedestrian tunnel. Only the first floor of the parking garage, consisting of 136 spaces, is open as of 2026. A small bridge over Little Dry Creek connects the station to additional parking along Creekside Drive. The pedestrian tunnel is home to a 90-foot-long (27 m) art installation by Brian W. Brush called "Grotto", which consists of high-density polyethylene plastic tubes lit by LED lights in an array of colors.

== History ==
Between the station's opening and the 2019 launch of the G Line, B Line trains ran express from this station to Union Station along a single track, bypassing Pecos Junction and 41st & Fox. Westminster is the only station exclusive to the B Line, and will remain so until the B Line's planned northern extension is built.

Westminster plans to encourage transit-oriented development in a 135-acre (55 ha) area around the station; a 40-acre (16 ha) park and open space is also planned for the south side of the station area. As of 2026, this development has yet to be constructed.

=== Potential closure ===
In late 2026, RTD began a review of proposals for rail and bus service cuts in order to close a $215 million shortfall. In each proposal, the B Line would be suspended until it is extended to at least Boulder. In tandem with this, Westminster station would be closed. Ridership along the B Line and at the station has declined by 74% since the COVID-19 pandemic, and a lack of development in this area of Westminster has hindered its usefulness. The station is 3 miles southeast of downtown Westminster, where most development in the city has been concentrated. Downtown Westminster is also the site of a planned Colorado Connector (CoCo) station at West 88th Avenue and Harlan Street. No connections are planned between the planned Westminster CoCo station and this station.

Westminster officials have criticized RTD's proposals to close the station, saying that service cuts would be "unthinkable" and "completely untenable" for the community.
