= Lewis Ralston =

Coordinates: 39.7980°N 105.0561°W

- Born: 1804; Anderson County, South Carolina.
- Died: 1870 (aged 65–66); Dalton, Georgia
- Occupations: farmer, trader, placer gold prospector, soldier
- Known for: discovery of gold

Lewis Ralston was an American placer gold prospector from Georgia who made the first recorded discovery of gold in the Rocky Mountain region.

== Life ==
Lewis Ralston was born in 1804 on a farm in what is now Anderson County, South Carolina. At age 21, he moved to the Cherokee district in the northern part of Georgia, in what is now Lumpkin County. Ralston soon met and went into business with Benjamin Parks, Jr., selling horses and cattle. In 1826, Ralson married Elizabeth Kell, a woman of Cherokee descent, and they moved onto Cherokee land. In 1828, Parks found flakes of gold along a deer path nearby, and the Georgia Gold Rush soon ensued. Ralston panned for gold on his own property with meager results.

On May 28, 1830, President Andrew Jackson signed the Indian Removal Act. Since Ralson was married to a Cherokee woman and lived on Cherokee land, the Act threatened his property. Ralston signed an Oath of Allegiance to the United States, but his property was awarded to Henry Slaughter in a lottery. Ralston purchased a home near the new town Auraria, Georgia.

On January 24, 1848, James W. Marshall found placer gold near Coloma, California, and unbeknownst nine days later, Mexico ceded California and the rest of northern Mexico to the United States with the Treaty of Guadalupe Hidalgo. The California Gold Rush ensued. In the spring of 1850, Ralston joined a wagon train of predominately Cherokee gold prospectors led by John Beck headed to the California gold fields. The party followed the Trail of Tears west, and on June 22, 1850, they crossed the South Platte River (a few miles north of what is today Denver) and camped near the confluence of two streams. Ralston panned for gold near the mouth of the smaller stream (in what is today Arvada.) He found about ¼ troy ounce (8 g) of gold, then worth about five dollars (about $550 USD today.) While Ralston was elated, the rest of the party was unimpressed and continued on to California the next morning. Ralston continued panning for gold, but gave up after a few days and caught up with his party. Ralston had little success in California, and soon returned to his family in Georgia where he settled near Dahlonega.

In 1858, John Beck and William Greeneberry “Green” Russell persuaded Ralston and some others from the original 1850 Cherokee California party to journey back to the site of Ralston's discovery of placer gold in the Pikes Peak Country. On June 24, the party arrived at the site of Ralston’s 1850 discovery, then a part of the Kansas Territory. After five days of futile prospecting, Beck, Ralston, and 45 other men returned to Georgia leaving Green Russell and about a dozen men along the South Platte River. The remaining prospectors ventured up the South Platte River to a site they called Mexican Diggings, which had been prospected by a group of Hispanic prospectors from Taos, New Mexico the previous summer. In July, Green Russel and Sam Bates discovered a small placer deposit of gold at the mouth of Little Dry Creek (in what is today Englewood) that yielded about 20 troy ounces (620 g) of gold, then worth about 380 dollars (about $44,000 USD today.) The party established a camp north of Little Dry Creek that they named Montana City. Some of the party were sent downstream to Omaha to get supplies. Word of the discovery spread quickly and soon precipitated to Pike’s Peak Gold Rush. By the time eager prospectors arrived from Omaha, the diggings at Little Dry Creek had played out and the party had moved downstream to Cherry Creek where they set up a camp named Auraria (named after Auraria, Georgia) to work the Cherry Creek Diggings (at the site of what is today Denver.) Ralston never returned to the Pikes Peak Country.

In 1863, Ralston was inducted into the Confederate Army at age 57. After the war, the Ralston family moved to Dalton, Georgia, where it is believed he died in 1870.

== Legacy ==
The site of Lewis Ralston's 1850 gold discovery now lies along Ralston Creek in the City of Arvada's Gold Strike Park. Arvada was originally platted in 1870 as the town of Ralston Point, Colorado.

Ralston Creek, Ralston Buttes, Ralston Valley, Ralston Dike, Ralston Reservoir, Ralston Road, Ralston Fields, Ralston Estates, and several other places in Jefferson County, Colorado are named in honor of Lewis Ralston.

== See also ==
- Gold mining
- Kansas Territory
- Arvada, Colorado
- Jefferson County, Colorado
