= Arvada Ridge station =

Commuter rail station in Arvada, Colorado

Arvada Ridge
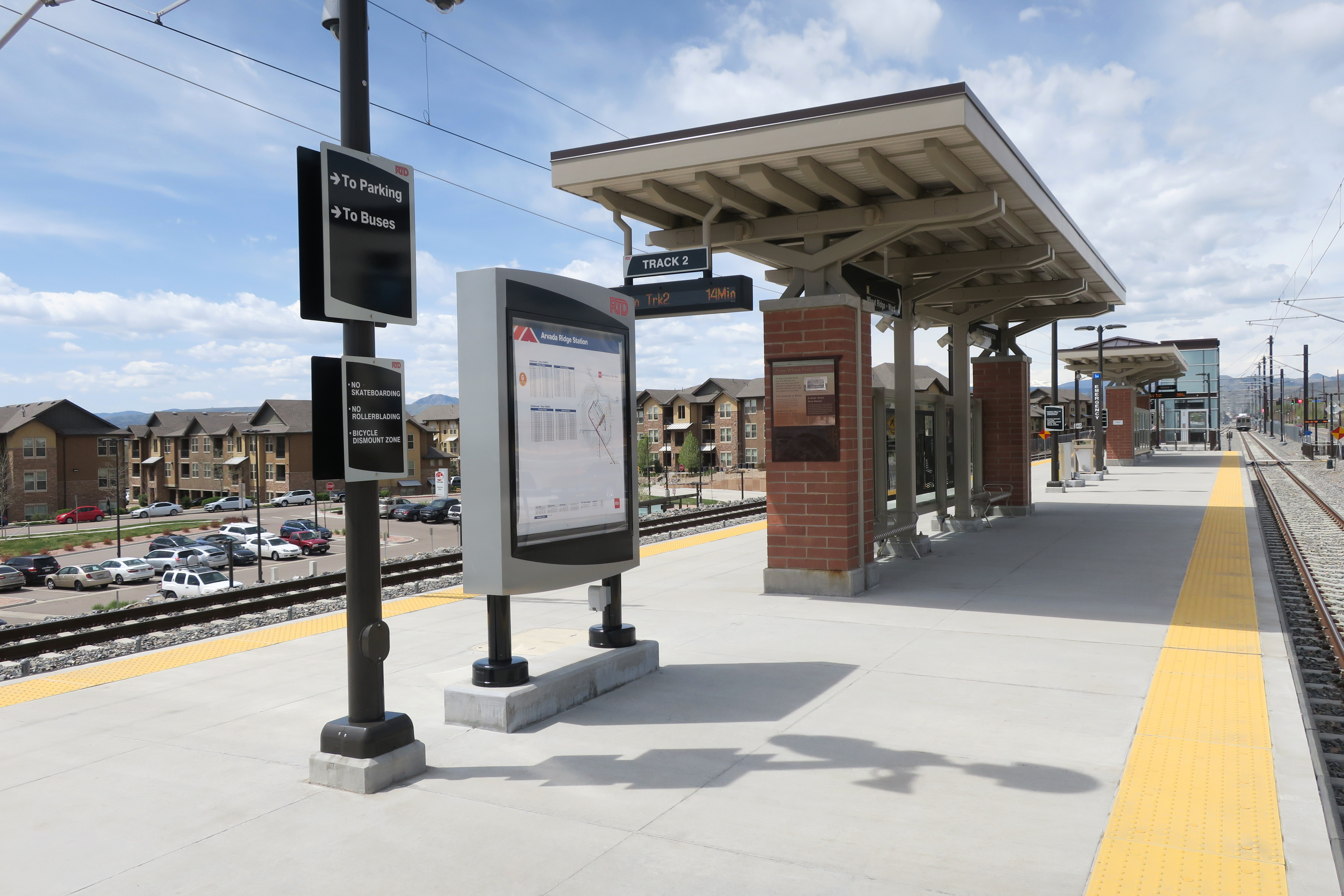
- Arvada Ridge Station Platform

General information
- Location: 10189 West 53rd Avenue; Arvada, Colorado
- Coordinates: 39°47′33″N 105°06′41″W
- Owner: Regional Transportation District
- Line: Gold Line
- Platforms: 1 island platform
- Tracks: 2
- Connections: RTD Bus: 100

Construction
- Structure type: At-grade
- Parking: 200 spaces
- Accessible: Yes

Other information
- Fare zone: Local

History
- Opened: April 26, 2019

Passengers
- 2025: 536 (average daily)
- Rank: 55 out of 75

Services
Preceding station	RTD	Following station
Wheat Ridge/Ward Terminus	G Line	Olde Town Arvada toward Union Station
Location

Arvada Ridge station is a Regional Transportation District (RTD) commuter rail station on the G Line in Arvada, Colorado. The station opened on April 26, 2019, along with the rest of the G Line.

== Station layout ==
2F

Platform Level

West Ridge Road; Red Rocks Community College
Westbound
← toward Wheat Ridge/Ward (Terminus)
Island platform, doors will open on the left
Eastbound
toward Union Station (Olde Town Arvada) →
1F
Pedestrian tunnel to platform
West 53rd Avenue; bus bays; parking

The station is located in western Arvada, near its border with Wheat Ridge. It is situated on the west side of Kipling Street near Red Rocks Community College's Arvada campus. The station's bus bays and 200-space park-and-ride lot are located south of the station, and are connected to it via a pedestrian underpass. A small gate at platform level connects the station to West Ridge Road and the campus. Public art at the station includes "Chromatic Harvest", a kaleidoscopic mural wall with geometric imagery of agriculture.

The area surrounding the station has been the site of Arvada's "education-focused" transit-oriented development, which has included new apartment buildings and townhomes on both sides of the station. A retail center anchored by Target is also located adjacent to the station.
