= Ralston Dam =

Dam in Jefferson County, Colorado

- Interactive map of Ralston Dam
- Country: United States
- Location: Jefferson County, Colorado.
- Coordinates: 39°50′00″N 105°14′27″W
- Status: Operational
- Opening date: 1937
- Owner: Denver Board Of Water Commissioners.
- Operator: Denver Board Of Water Commissioners

Dam and spillways
- Impounds: Ralston Creek
- Height: 204 ft (62 m)
- Length: 1,170 ft (360 m)

Reservoir
- Creates: Ralston Reservoir
- Total capacity: 15,900 acre⋅ft (19,600,000 m^{3})
- Active capacity: 13,200 acre⋅ft (16,300,000 m^{3})
- Surface area: 160 acres (65 ha)
- Normal elevation: 1,844 m (6,050 ft)

Ralston Dam (National ID # CO00205) is a dam in Jefferson County, Colorado.

The earthen dam was constructed in 1937 by the Denver Board Of Water Commissioners, with a height of 204 feet (62 m), and a length of 1,170 feet (360 m) at its crest. It impounds Ralston Creek for municipal water supply for the city of Denver. The dam is owned and operated by the Denver Board Of Water Commissioners.

The reservoir it creates, Ralston Reservoir, has a normal water surface of 160 acres (65 ha), has a maximum capacity of 15,900 acre-feet (19,600,000 m^{3}), and a normal capacity of 13,200 acre-feet (16,300,000 m^{3}).

In 2010 officials discovered that the defunct Schwartzwalder uranium mine was contaminating groundwater near the reservoir, threatening the Denver water supply with concentrations of uranium some 1000 times the human health standard. The owners of the mine, Cotter Corp., rerouted the Ralston Creek around the mine site after uranium levels of between 40 and 50 parts per billion were discovered in the creek, greater than the 30 ppb federal drinking water standard. Cotter hopes the rerouting will be temporary while it cleans the contaminated mine using bioremediation.
