= Olde Town Arvada =

- U.S. National Register of Historic Places
- U.S. Historic district
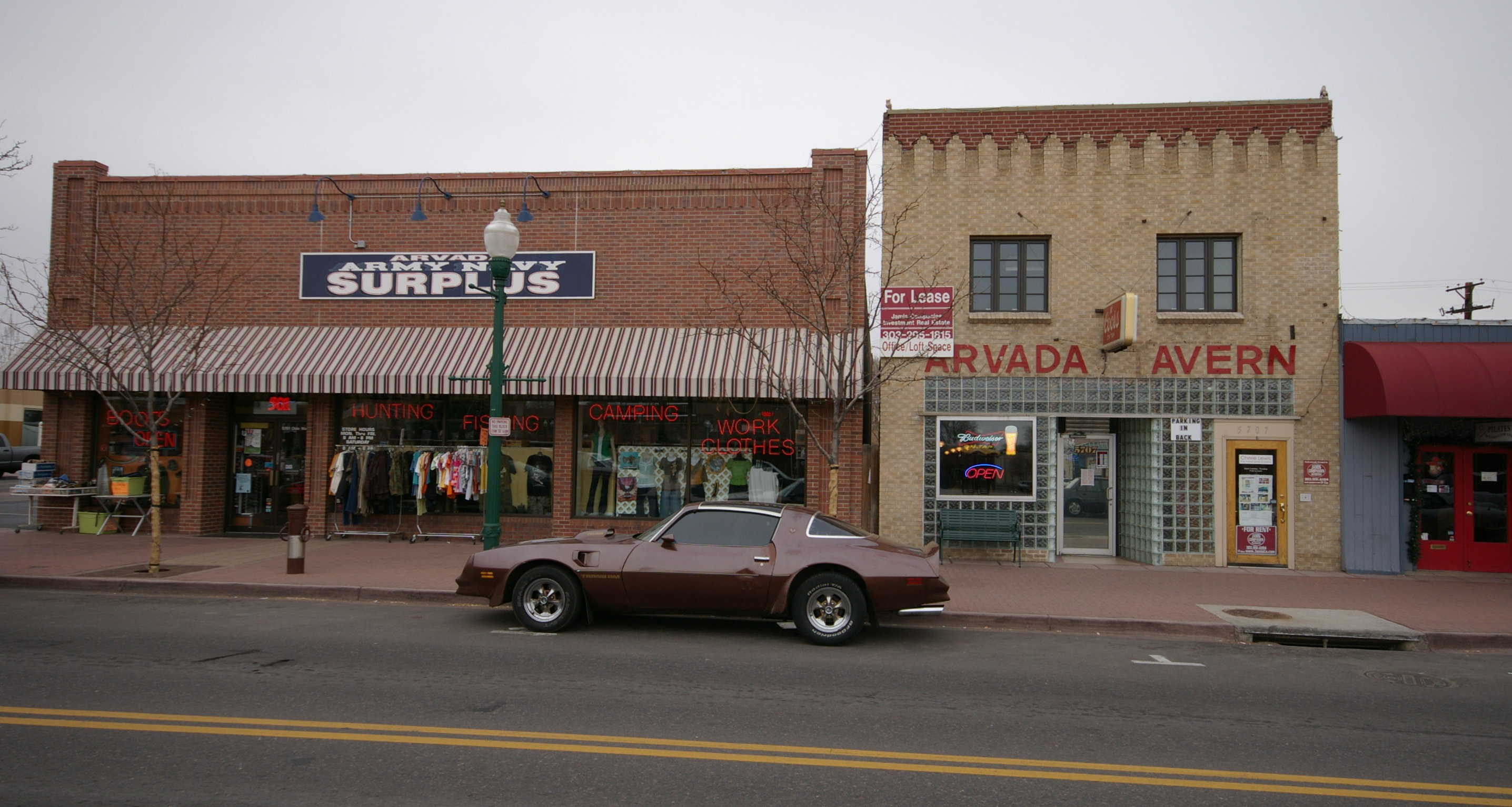

- Location within Colorado Location within the United States
- Location: Arvada, Colorado
- Coordinates: 39°48′01″N 105°04′53″W
- Area: 15.1 acres (6.1 ha)
- Built: 1974
- Architect: Harry James Manning
- Architectural style: Early Commercial, Queen Anne, Modern
- NRHP reference No.: 98000854
- Added to NRHP: July 15, 1998

Olde Town Arvada is a 15.1-acre (6.1 ha) historic district in Arvada, Colorado bounded by Ralston Road, Teller Road, Grandview Avenue and Yukon Street. It was listed on the National Register of Historic Places in 1998. The listing included 42 contributing buildings.

Its 1998 NRHP nomination stated:

The district is characterized by a variety of building types, including some of the most significant historic residences in the city, the largest concentration of historic business buildings in the city, the oldest Grange hall in the state, one of the few historic industrial facilities established in Arvada, and three substantial historic churches. Many of the buildings within the district were designed to fulfill more than one function, such as business blocks which had commercial space on the ground floor and living quarters or community halls on the upper floor. This combination of building functions within the downtown area typified Arvada's early history. Diversity of function led to the variety of construction materials, styles, landscaping, and setbacks within the district.

It includes the A.L. Davis Block building (1916), at 5600 Wadsworth Boulevard (a garage and Dodge and Chevrolet dealership, built of red brick, later expanded to absorb the 1882 school building that was to its north), and the First National Bank of Arvada (1903), at 7530 Grandview Avenue.

It is home to many local restaurants, breweries, taverns, and shops. The RTD commuter rail G-Line to Denver Union Station and Wheat Ridge/Ward has a stop at Olde Town Arvada.

== See also ==
- National Register of Historic Places listings in Jefferson County, Colorado
