= Ralston Creek (Colorado) =

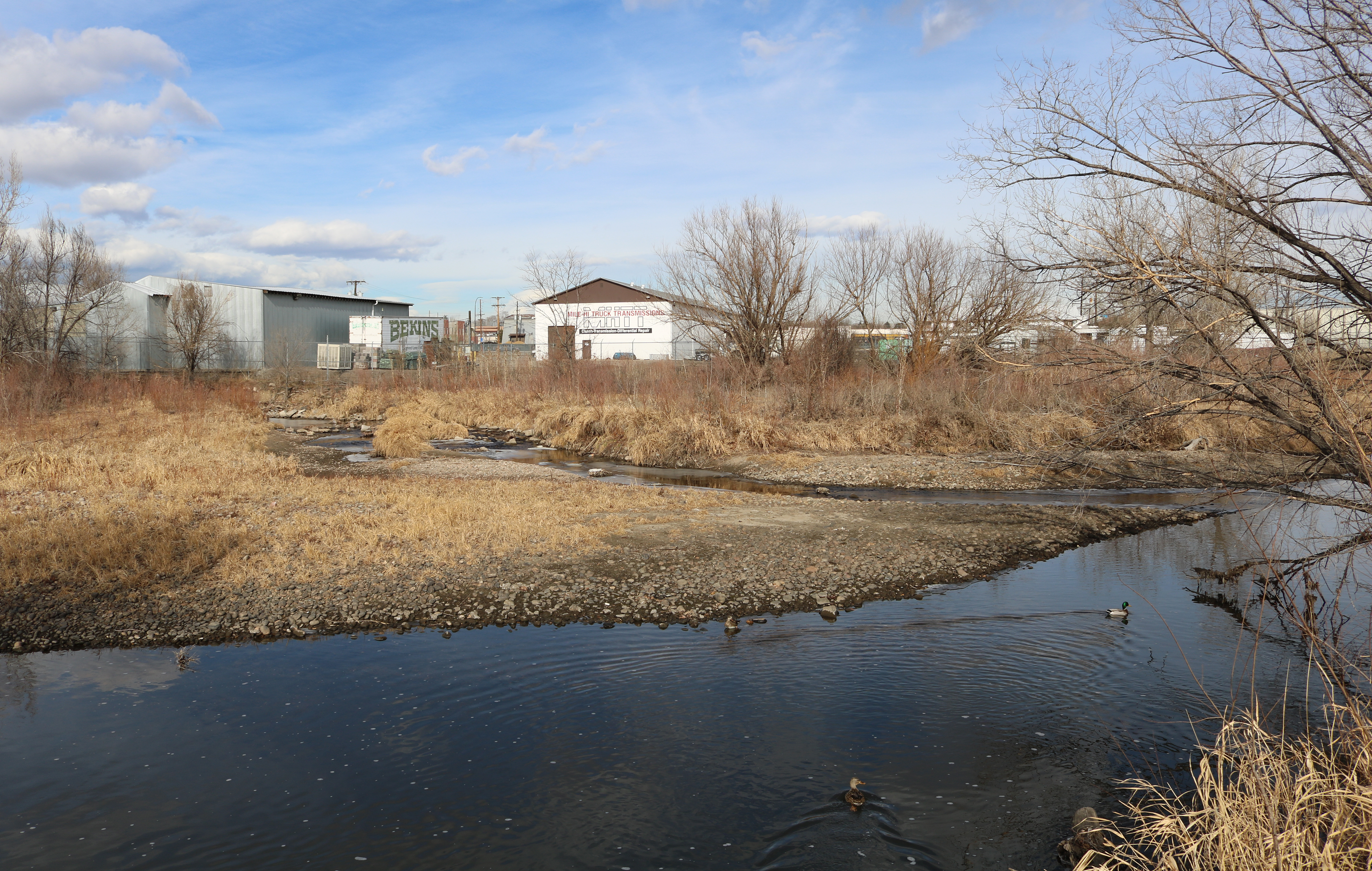
- The creek (center of picture) at its confluence with Clear Creek in Arvada's Gold Strike Park.

Physical characteristics
- Source
  - location: Gilpin County, Colorado; 39°51′38″N 105°29′54″W
- Mouth
  - location: Confluence with Clear Creek; 39°47′53″N 105°03′15″W
  - elevation: 5,249 ft (1,600 m)
- Length: 32 mi (51 km)

Basin features
- Progression: Clear Creek—South Platte— Platte—Missouri—Mississippi

Ralston Creek is a tributary of Clear Creek, approximately 32 miles (51 km) long, in central Colorado in the United States. It drains a suburban and urban area of the northwestern Denver Metropolitan Area. It rises in the foothills in northeastern Gilpin County, in southern Golden Gate Canyon State Park. It descends through a valley eastward into Jefferson, following Drew Hill Road (County Road 57), emerging from the mountains approximately 3 miles (5 km) north of Golden, where it is impounded to form Ralston Reservoir and Arvada/Blunn Reservoir on both sides of State Highway 93. It flows eastward through Arvada and joins Clear Creek from the north in southeast Arvada, near the intersection of Sheridan Avenue and Interstate 76.

== History ==
The first documented discovery of gold in the Rocky Mountain region occurred on June 22, 1850, when Lewis Ralston, a Georgia prospector traveling with a party headed for the California gold fields, dipped his sluice pan into a small stream near its confluence with Clear Creek. He found about ¼ troy ounce (8 g) of gold, then worth about five dollars (about $550 USD today.) While Ralston was elated, the rest of the party was unimpressed and continued on to California the next morning. Ralston continued panning for gold, but after a few days gave up and caught up with his party. The site of Lewis Ralston's gold discovery now lies along Ralston Creek in the City of Arvada's Gold Strike Park.

In 1858, Ralston brought another group of prospectors back to the site of his 1850 discovery. Ralston and most of the miners gave up after a few days, but several miners found gold upstream along the South Platte River.

In 2010 officials discovered that the defunct Schwartzwalder uranium mine was contaminating groundwater near the reservoir, threatening the Denver water supply with concentrations of uranium some 1000 times the human health standard. The owners of the mine, Cotter Corp., rerouted the Ralston Creek around the mine site after uranium levels of between 40 and 50 parts per billion were discovered in the creek, greater than the 30 ppb federal drinking water standard. Cotter hopes the rerouting will be temporary while it cleans the contaminated mine using bioremediation.

== See also ==
- List of rivers of Colorado
