= Arvada, Colorado =

City in Colorado, US

- Home rule city
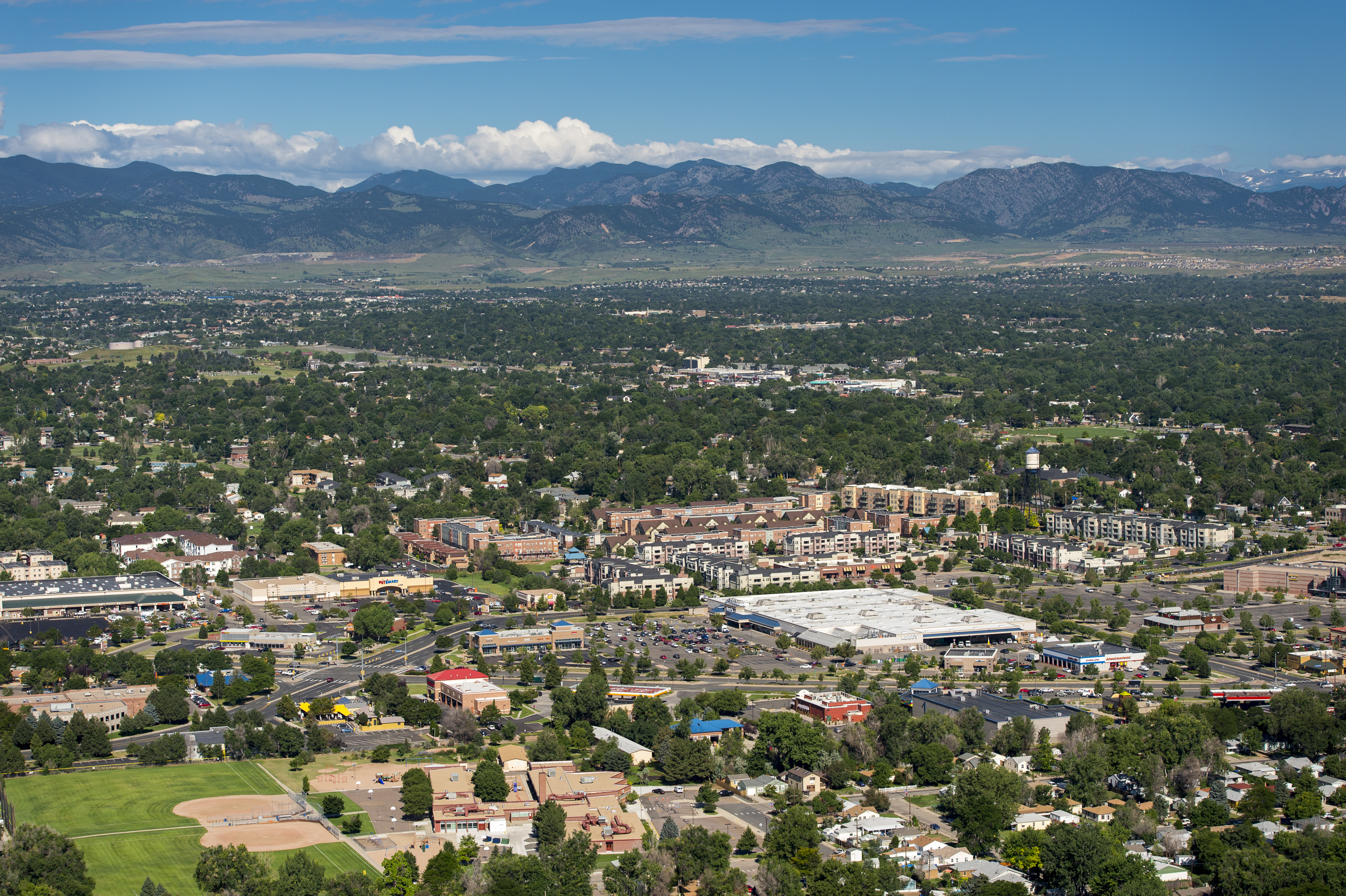
- Aerial view of Arvada

- Flag
- Interactive map of Arvada, Colorado
- Location within Colorado Location within the United States
- Coordinates: 39°51′16″N 105°14′06″W
- Country: United States
- State: Colorado
- Counties: Jefferson and Adams
- Settled: 1859
- Platted: December 1, 1870
- Incorporated: August 24, 1904
- Named for: Hiram Arvada Haskin

Government
  - Type: Home rule city
  - Mayor: Lauren Simpson (2023–)
  - City manager: Don Wick (2025–)

Area
  - Home rule city: 39.570 sq mi (102.485 km^{2})
  - Land: 38.910 sq mi (100.776 km^{2})
  - Water: 0.660 sq mi (1.709 km^{2})
- Elevation: 5,525 ft (1,684 m)

Population (2020)
  - Home rule city: 124,402
  - Rank: 7th in Colorado; 229th in the United States
  - Density: 3,197/sq mi (1,234/km^{2})
  - Metro: 2,963,821 (19th)
  - CSA: 3,623,560 (17th)
  - Front Range: 5,055,344
- Demonym: Arvadan
- Time zone: UTC– 07:00 (MST)
  - Summer (DST): UTC– 06:00 (MDT)
- ZIP codes: 80001-80007 and 80403
- Area codes: 303/720/983
- GNIS city ID: 2409737
- FIPS code: 08-03455
- Website: City of Arvada

Arvada (/ɑːrˈvædə/) is a home rule city in Jefferson and Adams counties, Colorado, United States. The population was 124,402 at the 2020 United States census, with 121,510 residing in Jefferson County and 2,892 in Adams County. Arvada is the seventh-most populous city in Colorado. The city is a part of the Denver metropolitan area and the Front Range Urban Corridor. The Olde Town Arvada historic district is 7 miles (11 km) northwest of the Colorado State Capitol in Denver.

== History ==
The region around Arvada has been inhabited by Native Americans and their Paleo-American ancestors for at least 13,500 years and possibly more than 37,000 years. Before 1858, the Arvada area was occupied by the Arapaho and Cheyenne people. The Ute and Comanche people would also occasionally visit the area. White American travelers would generally avoid the Southern Rocky Mountains and would usually travel along the Oregon Trail through what is now Wyoming.

The first documented discovery of gold in the Rocky Mountain region occurred on June 22, 1850, when Lewis Ralston, a Georgia prospector traveling with a party headed for the California gold fields, dipped his sluice pan into a small stream near its confluence with Clear Creek. He found about ¼ troy ounce (8 g) of gold, then worth about five dollars (about $1,300 USD today. (Note: Gold was quoted at US$163.26 per gram on January 27, 2026.)) While Ralston was elated, the rest of the party was unimpressed and continued on to California the next morning. Ralston continued panning for gold, but after a few days gave up and caught up with his party. The site of Lewis Ralston's gold discovery now lies along Ralston Creek in the City of Arvada's Gold Strike Park.

In 1858, Ralston brought another group of prospectors back to the site of his first discovery. Ralston and most of the miners gave up after a few days, but several miners found gold upstream along the South Platte River. The placer gold in the area soon played out, but hard rock deposits of gold were found in the mountains to the west. In 1860, Benjamin F. Wadsworth claimed a homestead of 160 acres (65 ha) along Clear Creek, and the following year began digging an irrigation ditch, that would later take his name, to water his crops. Some of the miners abandoned their search for gold and returned to farm the rich bottom land along Ralston Creek and Clear Creek. They found an eager market for their crops among other gold seekers. The Territory of Colorado was formed on February 28, 1861, and the farms in the valley expanded to feed the growing population of the region.

In the summer of 1870, the Colorado Central Railroad laid tracks through the area from the junction of Kansas Pacific Railroad and the Denver Pacific Railroad at Jersey Junction, 3 miles (5 km) north of Denver City, to connect to Golden at the mouth of Clear Creek Canyon. On December 1, 1870, Benjamin Wadsworth and Louis A. Reno platted the Ralston Point townsite along the railroad. To avoid confusion with other communities along Ralston Creek, Ralston Point was soon renamed Arvada in honor of Hiram Arvada Haskin, brother-in-law of settler Mary Wadsworth. The Arvada, Colorado, post office opened on February 16, 1871, with Benjamin Wadsworth as the first postmaster. Colorado was granted statehood on August 1, 1876, and the Town of Arvada was incorporated on August 14, 1904. Eventually 42 irrigation ditches would serve the vibrant agricultural community.

As the region's population grew, Arvada became a major supplier of produce and dairy products. In the first half of the twentieth century, Arvada gained renown for its Pascal celery, with special shipments made to the White House. Arvada staked a claim as the "Celery Capital of the World." With the labor shortages of World War II, celery production declined.

Following the war, Arvada grew rapidly as a suburb of nearby Denver, the state capital. In 1947, Lloyd J. King opened Colorado's first supermarket at the corner of West 57th Avenue and Webster Street in downtown Arvada. Arvada became a Statutory City on October 31, 1951, and a Home Rule Municipality on July 23, 1963. By the end of the millennium, the population of Arvada exceeded 100,000.

=== Missionary shooting ===
On December 9, 2007, Matthew J. Murray walked into the Youth With a Mission Center in Arvada and, after he was refused his request to stay overnight in the dormitories, opened fire and killed two people, injuring two more.

A memorial was held the following Wednesday, December 12, in which Youth With a Mission leaders forgave Murray's family for what happened.

== Geography ==
At the 2020 United States census, the city had a total area of 25,325 acres (102.485 km^{2}), including 422 acres (1.709 km^{2}) of water.

=== Climate ===
Arvada has a humid continental Köppen climate classification, abbreviated as Dfb.

Climate data for the City of Arvada, Colorado. Elevation 5,348 feet (1,630 m).
Month	Jan	Feb	Mar	Apr	May	Jun	Jul	Aug	Sep	Oct	Nov	Dec	Year
Mean daily maximum °F (°C)	46.2 (7.9)	47.3 (8.5)	56 (13)	62.3 (16.8)	71.2 (21.8)	83.3 (28.5)	89.4 (31.9)	87.1 (30.6)	79.4 (26.3)	66.4 (19.1)	54.2 (12.3)	45.7 (7.6)	65.7 (18.7)
Daily mean °F (°C)	32.6 (0.3)	33.9 (1.1)	41.9 (5.5)	48.4 (9.1)	57.5 (14.2)	68.2 (20.1)	74.3 (23.5)	72.1 (22.3)	64 (18)	51.3 (10.7)	40.4 (4.7)	32.3 (0.2)	51.4 (10.8)
Mean daily minimum °F (°C)	18.9 (−7.3)	20.4 (−6.4)	27.9 (−2.3)	34.4 (1.3)	43.8 (6.6)	53.1 (11.7)	59.2 (15.1)	57.1 (13.9)	48.5 (9.2)	36.3 (2.4)	26.5 (−3.1)	18.9 (−7.3)	37.1 (2.8)
Average precipitation inches (mm)	0.56 (14)	0.65 (17)	1.34 (34)	2.2 (56)	2.53 (64)	1.71 (43)	1.73 (44)	1.63 (41)	1.21 (31)	1.16 (29)	0.84 (21)	0.53 (13)	16.09 (409)
Source: PRISM Climate Group

== Demographics ==
Historical population
Census	Pop.	Note	%±
1910	840		—
1920	915		8.9%
1930	1,276		39.5%
1940	1,482		16.1%
1950	2,359		59.2%
1960	19,242		715.7%
1970	49,844		159.0%
1980	84,576		69.7%
1990	89,235		5.5%
2000	102,153		14.5%
2010	106,433		4.2%
2020	124,402		16.9%
2024 (est.)	121,873	▼	−2.0%
U.S. Decennial Census

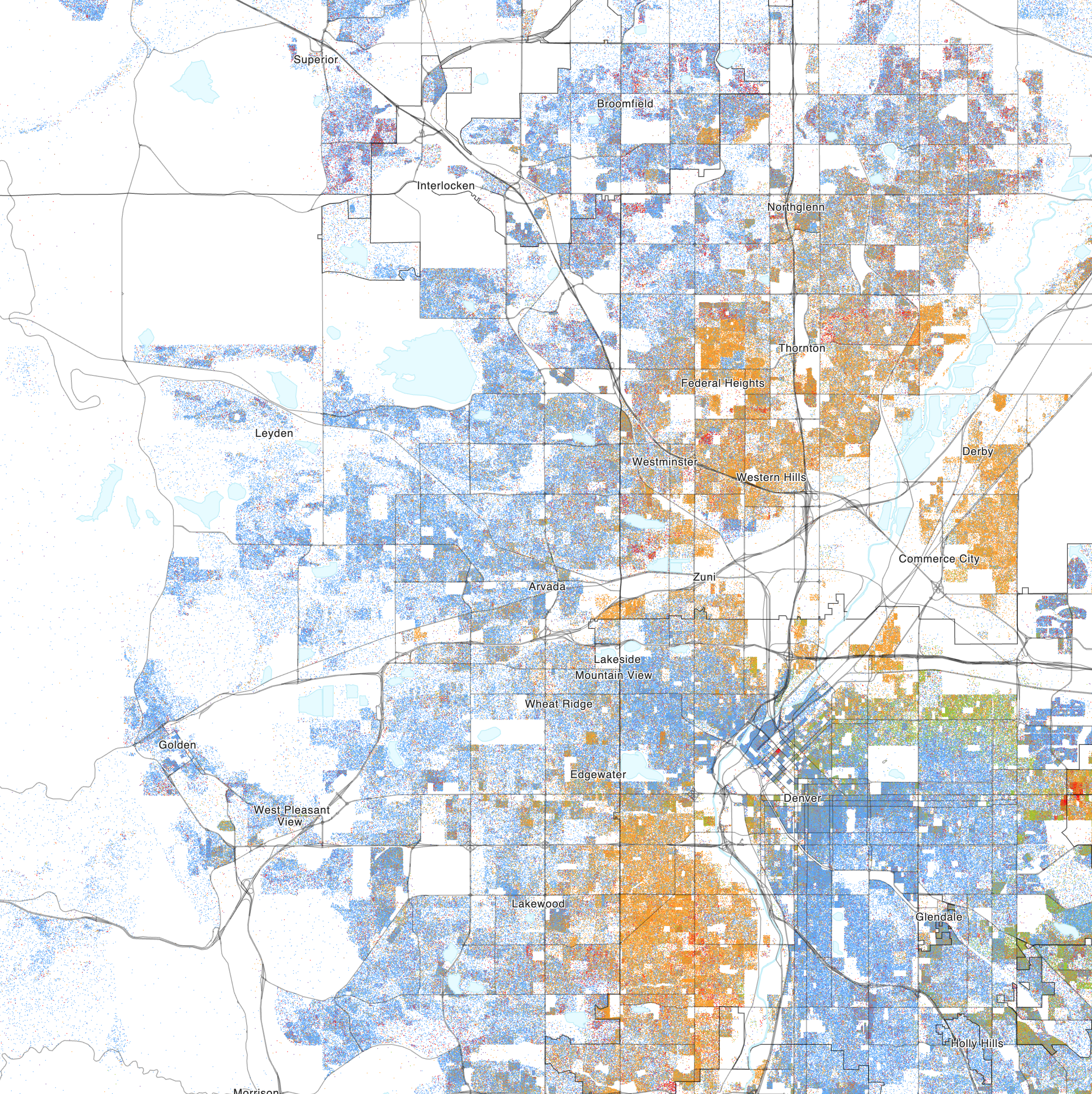
Map of racial distribution in Arvada, 2020 U.S. census. Each dot is one person: ⬤ White ⬤ Black ⬤ Asian ⬤ Hispanic ⬤ Multiracial ⬤ Native American/Other

=== 2020 census ===
Arvada, Colorado – Racial and ethnic composition Note: the US Census treats Hispanic/Latino as an ethnic category. This table excludes Latinos from the racial categories and assigns them to a separate category. Hispanics/Latinos may be of any race.
Race / Ethnicity (NH = Non-Hispanic)	Pop 2000	Pop 2010	Pop 2020	% 2000	% 2010	% 2020
White alone (NH)	87,302	86,556	94,989	85.46%	81.32%	76.36%
Black or African American alone (NH)	628	841	1,183	0.61%	0.79%	0.95%
Native American or Alaska Native alone (NH)	419	437	550	0.41%	0.41%	0.44%
Asian alone (NH)	2,175	2,225	3,096	2.13%	2.09%	2.49%
Pacific Islander alone (NH)	47	58	72	0.05%	0.05%	0.06%
Some Other Race alone (NH)	87	110	486	0.09%	0.10%	0.39%
Mixed Race or Multi-Racial (NH)	1,464	1,670	5,390	1.43%	1.57%	4.33%
Hispanic or Latino (any race)	10,031	14,536	18,636	9.82%	13.66%	14.98%
Total	102,153	106,433	124,402	100.00%	100.00%	100.00%

As of the census of 2010, there were 106,433 people, 42,701 households, and 28,927 families residing in the city. The population density was 3,028.1 inhabitants per square mile (1,169.2/km^{2}). There were 44,427 housing units at an average density of 1,216.7 units per square mile (469.8 units/km^{2}) with a median value of $240,000. The racial makeup of the city was 89.08% White, 0.9% African American, 0.8% Native American, 2.2% Asian, 0.1% Pacific Islander, 3.5% from other races, and 2.7% from two or more races. Hispanic or Latino of any race were 13.7% of the population.

There were 44,427 households, out of which 31.9% had children under the age of 18 living with them, 52.5% were married couples living together, 10.7% had a female householder with no husband present, and 32.3% were non-families. 26.3% of all households were made up of individuals, and 9.8% had someone living alone who was 65 years of age or older. The average household size was 2.48 and the average family size was 3.00.

In the city the population's ages were spread out, with 23.4% under the age of 18, 5.5% from 20 to 24, 25.1% from 25 to 44, 29.8% from 45 to 64, and 13.8% who were 65 years of age or older. The median age was 40.5 years. There were 51,984 males and 54,539 Females.

The median income for a household in the city was $66,125 and the median income for a family was $78,591. Males had a median income of $42,126 versus $30,802 for females. The per capita income for the city was $24,679. About 4.6% of families and 6.4% of the population were below the poverty line.

== Government ==
The City of Arvada is a Home Rule Municipality with a council–manager form of government. The Arvada City Council has seven members: an elected mayor, two councilmembers elected at large, and four councilmembers elected from council districts.

Arvada City Council
Office	Incumbent	Term
Mayor	Lauren Simpson	2023– (District 2 Councilmember, 2019–2023)
Mayor Pro Tem and Councilmember, District One	Randy Moorman	2021–
Councilmember, District Two	Shawna Ambrose	2023–
Councilmember, District Three	John Marriott	2013–
Councilmember, District Four	Bob Fifer	2023– (At-large, 2011–2023)
Councilmember At-Large	Brad Rupert	2024–
Councilmember At-Large	Sharon Davis	2023–

The city council selects the city manager. The Arvada City Manager is Don Wick

== Economy ==
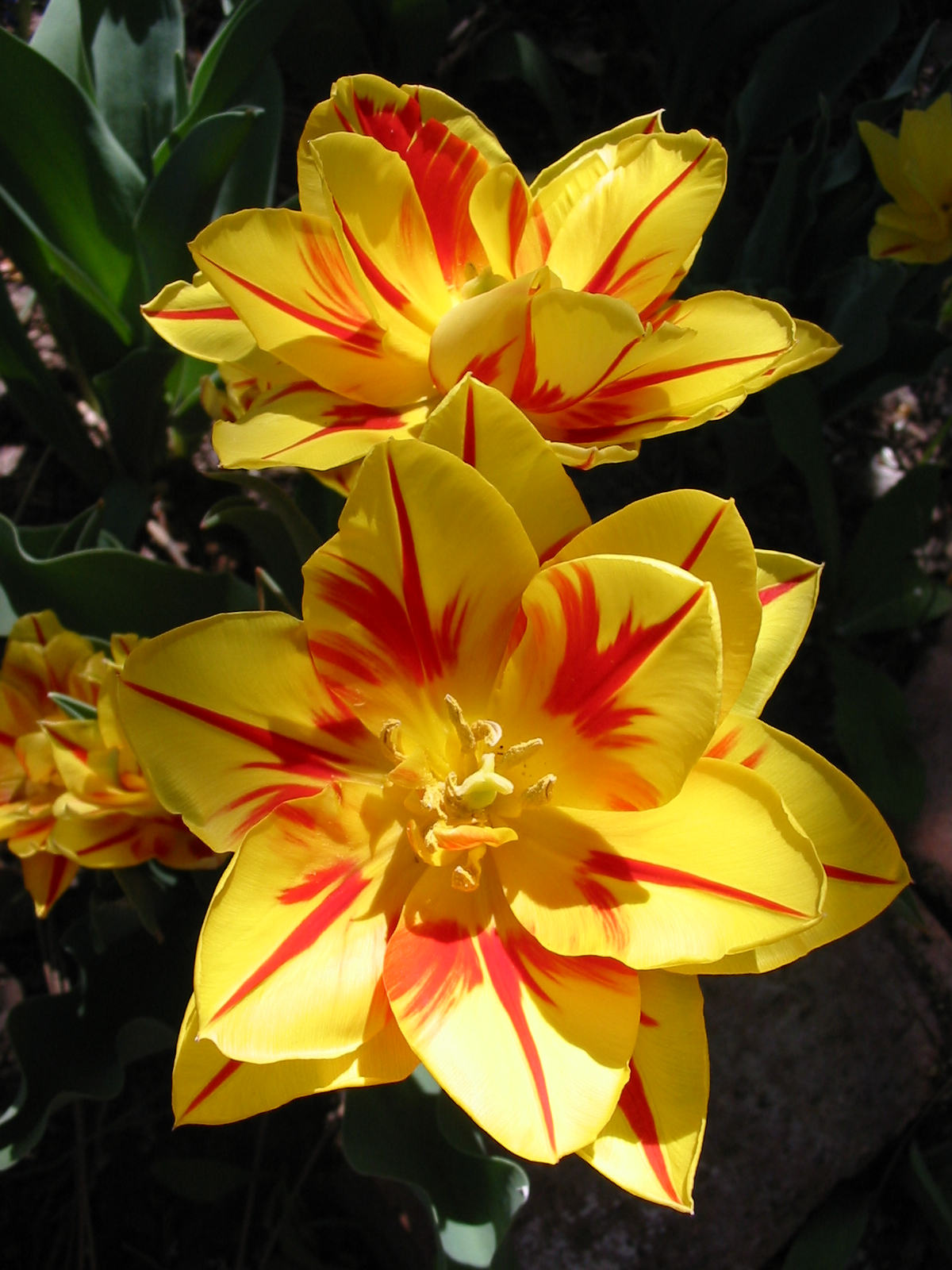
"Monsella" tulip, blooming in Arvada 2006

Arvada is predominately a residential community with light industry and professional offices. Olde Town Arvada is the historic heart of the city with shops, restaurants, and the Olde Town Arvada Transit Hub. The primary restaurant and retail corridors are along Wadsworth Boulevard, Ralston Road, and Kipling Street.

=== Industry ===
The Rocky Flats Plant operated from 1952 to 1992, as a manufacturing complex that produced nuclear triggers.

== Education ==
The portion of Arvada in Jefferson County is served by the Jefferson County School District R-1. The portion of Arvada in Adams County is served by the Westminster Public Schools. High schools within Arvada include Arvada High School, Arvada West High School, Ralston Valley High School and Pomona Jr./Sr, High school.

== Tourism and recreation ==
Attractions include:

- Arvada Center for the Arts and Humanities
- Cussler Museum rare automobile collection
- Olde Town Arvada historic district
- Rocky Flats National Wildlife Refuge
- Two Ponds National Wildlife Refuge

== Transportation ==
=== Highways ===
Arvada is the western terminus of Interstate 76, which begins at the intersection of Interstate 70 and State Highway 121. Other state highways in Arvada include SH 72, SH 93, and SH 95. Major highways near Arvada include Interstate 25, Interstate 270, U.S. Highway 36 and U.S. Highway 287.

=== Mass transit ===
The Amtrak California Zephyr passes through Arvada westbound each morning and eastbound each evening and stops at the nearby Denver Union Station. This route passes through the Rocky Mountains en route from Chicago to Emeryville, California, near Oakland.

Arvada is served by the Regional Transportation District (RTD) commuter rail G line with stops at three stations, Arvada Ridge, Olde Town Arvada, 60th & Sheridan/Arvada Gold Strike and service to Union Station in Downtown Denver. RTD bus routes 28, 32, 51, 52, 72, 76, and 100 also serve the Arvada area.

=== Airports ===
Arvada is served by Denver International Airport and nearby Rocky Mountain Metropolitan Airport.

=== Bicycling ===
In 2014 the League of American Bicyclists designated Arvada as a Silver Level Bicycle Friendly Community.

== Notable people ==
Notable individuals who were born in, or have lived in, Arvada include novelist Clive Cussler, baseball pitcher Roy Halladay, Joe King and Isaac Slade of the rock band The Fray, actor Nicholas Alexander Chavez, politician Karl Rove, and professional golfer and U.S. Olympic track and field gold medalist Babe Didrikson Zaharias.

== Sister cities ==
Arvada's sister cities are:

- Jinzhou, China
- Kyzylorda, Kazakhstan

== See also ==
- Denver-Aurora-Centennial, CO Metropolitan Statistical Area
- Denver-Aurora-Greeley, CO Combined Statistical Area
- Front Range Urban Corridor
