= North Washington, Colorado =

Census-designated place in Adams County, CO, USA

- Census-designated place
- Location of the North Washington CDP in Adams County, Colorado
- Coordinates: 39°48′20″N 104°59′30″W
- Country: United States
- State: Colorado
- County: Adams County

Government
  - Type: unincorporated community

Area
  - Total: 5.426 sq mi (14.053 km^{2})
  - Land: 5.175 sq mi (13.403 km^{2})
  - Water: 0.251 sq mi (0.650 km^{2})
- Elevation: 5,191 ft (1,582 m)

Population (2020)
  - Total: 733
  - Density: 142/sq mi (54.7/km^{2})
- Time zone: UTC-7 (MST)
  - Summer (DST): UTC-6 (MDT)
- ZIP Code: 80216
- Area codes: 303 & 720
- GNIS feature: 2408953

North Washington is an unincorporated community and a census-designated place (CDP) in Adams County, Colorado, United States. The CDP is a part of the Denver–Aurora–Lakewood, CO Metropolitan Statistical Area. The population of the North Washington CDP was 733 at the United States Census 2020. The Denver Post is headquartered and printed in North Washington.

== Geography ==
The North Washington CDP has an area of 3,473 acres (14.053 km^{2}), including 161 acres (0.650 km^{2}) of water.

== Demographics ==
The United States Census Bureau initially defined the North Washington CDP for the United States Census 2000.

North Washington CDP, Colorado
Year	Pop.	±%
2000	549	—
2010	484	−11.8%
2020	733	+51.4%
Source: United States Census Bureau

== See also ==
- Colorado census designated places
