= Wheat Ridge/Ward station =

Commuter rail station in Wheat Ridge, Colorado

Wheat Ridge•Ward
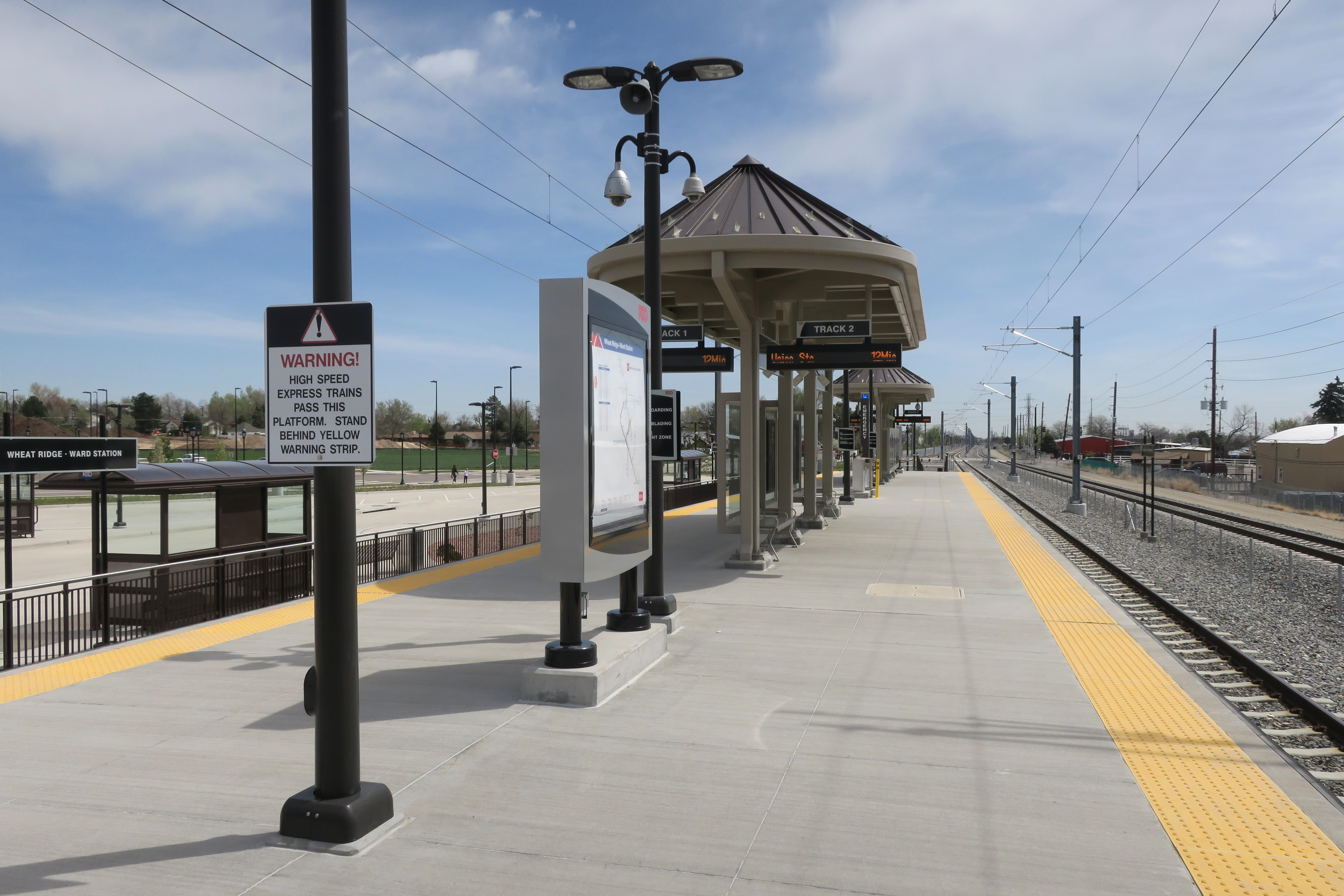
- Wheat Ridge/Ward station platform

General information
- Location: 12000 West Ridge Road; Wheat Ridge, Colorado
- Coordinates: 39°47′17″N 105°07′59″W
- Owner: Regional Transportation District
- Line: Gold Line
- Platforms: 1 island platform
- Tracks: 2
- Connections: RTD Bus: 44

Construction
- Structure type: At-grade
- Parking: 290 spaces
- Accessible: Yes

Other information
- Fare zone: Local

History
- Opened: April 26, 2019

Passengers
- 2025: 693 (average daily)
- Rank: 45 out of 75

Services
Preceding station	RTD	Following station
Terminus	G Line	Arvada Ridge toward Union Station
Location

Wheat Ridge/Ward station (sometimes stylized as Wheat Ridge•Ward) is a Regional Transportation District (RTD) commuter rail station on the G Line in Wheat Ridge, Colorado. The station opened on April 26, 2019, along with the rest of the G Line.

Wheat Ridge/Ward station is the western terminus of the G Line.

== Station layout ==
1F

Platform Level

West Ridge Road; bus bays; parking
Eastbound
toward Union Station (Arvada Ridge) →
Island platform, doors will open on the left or right
Eastbound
toward Union Station (Arvada Ridge) →

The station is located in northern Wheat Ridge, between Ward Road and Tabor Street. It includes bus bays and a 290-space park-and-ride lot on the north side of West Ridge Road. Westbound G Line trains terminate on one of two tracks, from which they return to Union Station. These tracks extend past the end of the station to allow for terminating trains to lay over. Public art at the station includes "Anchored by Place", a steel-and-bronze sculpture by Michael Clapper.

When originally conceived of in the 1990s, the G Line's western terminus was located in downtown Golden. RTD owns the G Line's rail right-of-way to Golden from this station, however there are no plans to extend the line there. Despite its proximity and accessibility to Golden via C-58 for passengers using personal vehicles, there are no onward bus connections to Golden from this station.

Wheat Ridge/Ward is the only RTD rail station within the city of Wheat Ridge, and was prepared by the city for transit-oriented development. In 2016, voters in Wheat Ridge approved a $12 million sales tax to improve roadways and other infrastructure around the area to lure development. As of 2026, land north of the station, formerly warehouses and vacant lots, has been developed into apartment complexes and townhomes.
