= William Ellsworth Fisher =

American architect

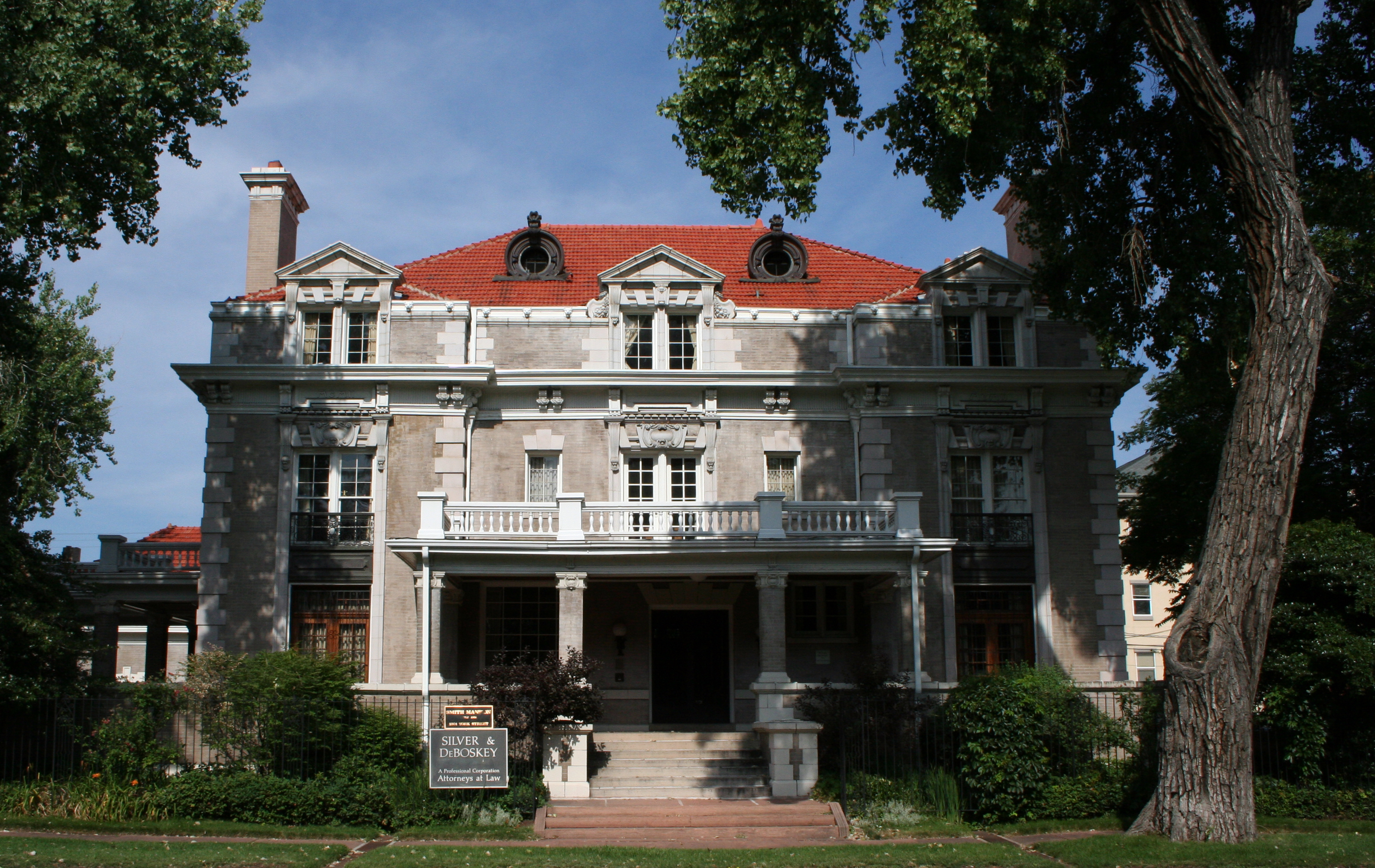
Frank L. Smith House, Denver, 1902, with Daniel Riggs Huntington

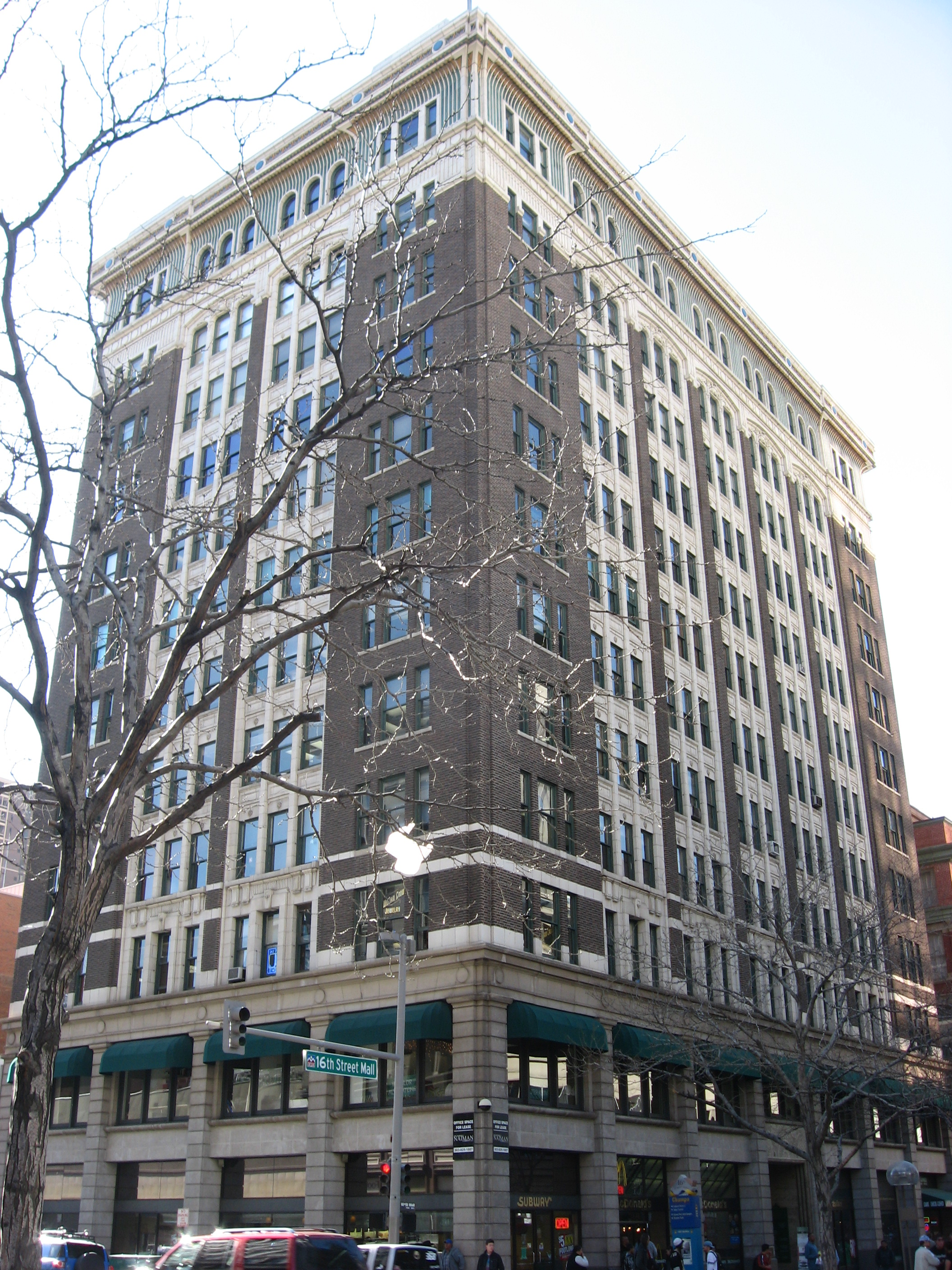
A.C. Foster Building, downtown Denver, 1911 by Fisher & Fisher

William Ellsworth Fisher (1871 – 1937) was an architect who founded the Denver, Colorado firm that became Fisher & Fisher.

Fisher's father, Allen S. Fisher, moved to Denver from Clinton, Ontario, Canada, with his family in 1885. William became a draftsman for Balcomb & Rice in Denver in 1890 and then studied briefly with C. Powell Karr in New York. In 1892 he went into business in Denver as William Fisher, Architect. After ten years in solo practice, mainly designing starter homes, he partnered from 1901 to 1905 with Daniel Riggs Huntington, who had also worked for Balcomb & Rice. During this time the firm designed increasingly expensive residences and also commercial buildings. After returning to solo practice for a couple of years, he then partnered with his younger brother Arthur Addison Fisher from 1907 until his death in 1937. His son Alan B. Fisher also worked for the firm and became a partner after William's death.

The Fisher firm was extremely prestigious and left an extensive legacy in Colorado; 50 of 67 remaining buildings in Denver are either eligible for listing by the National Register of Historic Places or are listed either individually or as part of historic districts. Most of these, including residences, schools, churches, hospitals and commercial buildings, are from the period when William Fisher was in partnership with his brother. One assessment of the brothers' work is that because of their unusual originality and creativity, "Their contribution to Denver's early stylistic independence is enormous."

In 1908–09, Fisher was one of ten architects invited by The Delineator magazine to participate in a competition to design a $3,000 country house; however, he did not place. In the 1920s, Fisher was head of the Mountain Bureau of the Architects' Small House Service, which created standardized plans for cheap one- to three-bedroom houses to reduce costs for middle-class families. In the mid-1920s, he and his brother planned the oil company town of Parco, Wyoming (now Sinclair) and designed many buildings there, in a uniform Spanish Colonial style intended to encourage community spirit. The original town (Parco Historic District) centering on the plaza and the Parco Inn (formerly the Parco Hotel and the Sinclair Hotel) is now on the National Register of Historic Places.

== Notable works ==
- City Park Pavilion (Denver, 1896), Spanish Colonial style. With John J. Humphreys.
- Frank L. Smith House (Denver, 1902), French Eclectic style. With Daniel Huntington.
- St. Stephen's Episcopal Church / Church of the Holy Redeemer (Denver, 1910), Gothic revival, one of only 3 churches known to have been designed by William E. and Arthur A. Fisher.
- A.C. Foster Building (Denver, 1911): 12-story office building with art Nouveau elements, one of the first tall Denver buildings after repeal of an ordinance limiting heights to 9 stories. "[P]ossibly the most exciting and original skyscraper to appear in Denver prior to World War I." Now University Building. With Arthur A. Fisher.
- Tramway Building (Denver, 1911): office building and streetcar barn, now Teatro Hotel. With Arthur A. Fisher.
- Lorraine Lodge / Charles Boettcher Summer Home (Lookout Mountain, 1916–18), Rustic and Tudor styles, built of rubble fieldstone probably gathered at the site, with timber framing on the upper stories. Denver Municipal Facts said in 1930, "This great house built of gray stone might well have been designed for the seclusion of a warrior" and talked of "ancient castle atmosphere". Now Jefferson County Conference and Nature Center. With Arthur A. Fisher.
- Foster-Buell Estate (Cherry Hills Village, 1920), Colonial Revival style. With Arthur A. Fisher.
- U.S. National Bank, later Guaranty Bank and Trust (Denver, 1921): 10-story office building with neo-classical and neo-Renaissance detailing, now Bank Lofts. Fisher & Fisher.
- Neusteter Building (Denver, 1924): 5-story department store, "one of the finest examples of Commercial Style architecture in Denver," now Neusteter Lofts. Fisher & Fisher.
- South High School (Denver, 1924), Romanesque style, "one of Denver's most distinctive schools," with a clock tower based on that at Santa Maria in Cosmedin, with the zodiac instead of numbers on the clock face. With Arthur A. Fisher.
- Beth Jacob / Isaac Solomon Synagogue (Lakewood, 1926), Moorish style, serving the Jewish Consumptives' Relief Society tuberculosis sanatorium and replacing a 1911 building destroyed by fire. With Arthur A. Fisher.
- St. Thomas Episcopal Church (Alamosa, 1926, extended 1930), Mission Revival style. With Arthur A. Fisher.
- Ideal Building (Denver, 1927): Adaptation and extension of office building by Montana Fallis to bank (now Colorado Business Bank), with complete reworking of interior including creation of a bank vault (now a restaurant) and stylistic conversion adding detail to the Chicago-style exterior, including main entrance with marble buffalo heads and cast bronze doors weighing one ton each recalling those of Lorenzo Ghiberti for the Florence Baptistery and featuring bas reliefs of American Indian dancing. With Arthur A. Fisher.
- Tower of Memories (Wheat Ridge, (1928–): continuation in Modernist style of Gothic tower designed by Charles A. Smith. Fisher & Fisher. Completed by John Monroe.
- Belcaro / Phipps House (Denver, 1932), Georgian style. Fisher & Fisher.

== Gallery ==
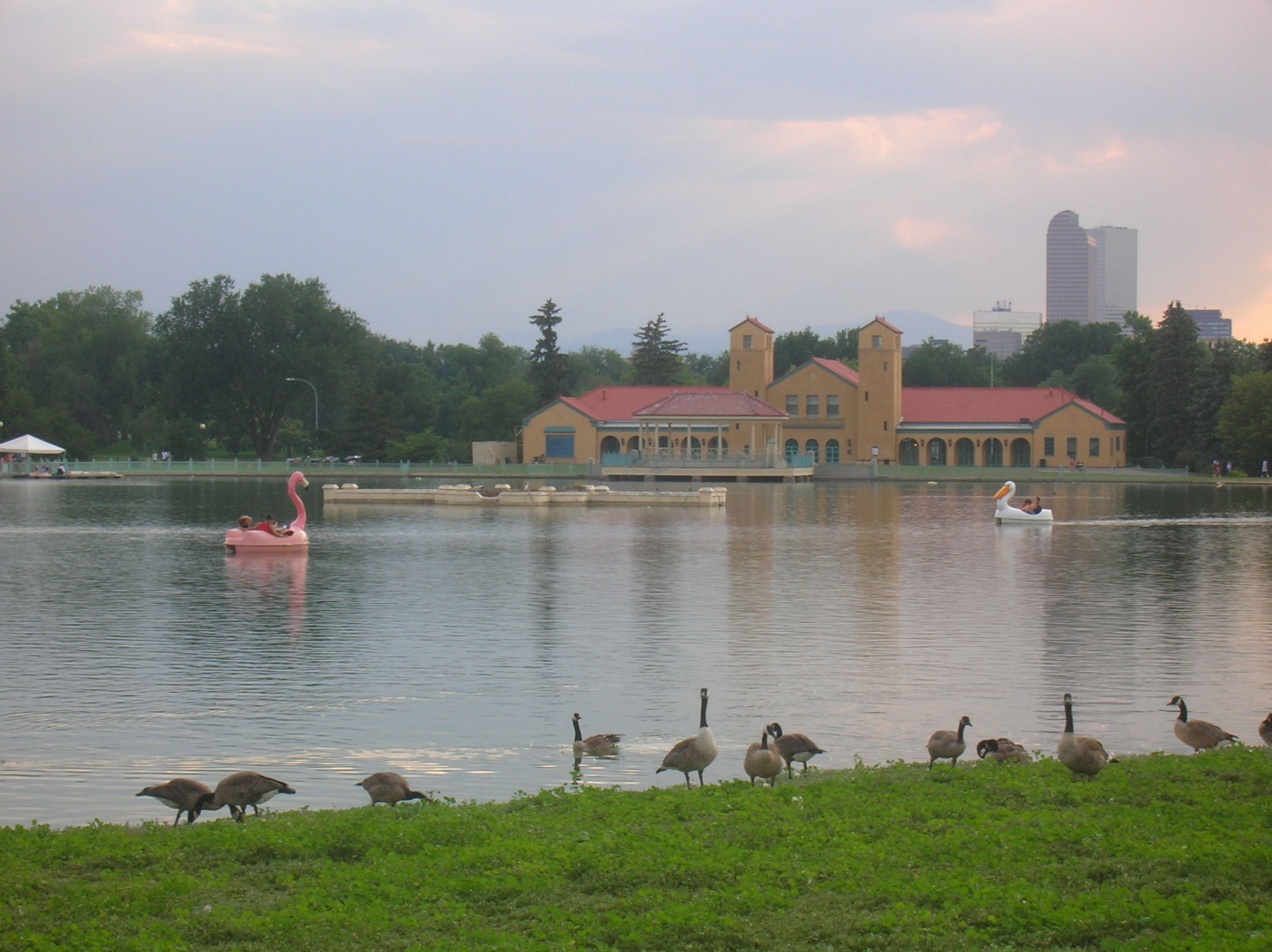
City Park Pavilion, Denver, 1896, with John J. Humphreys

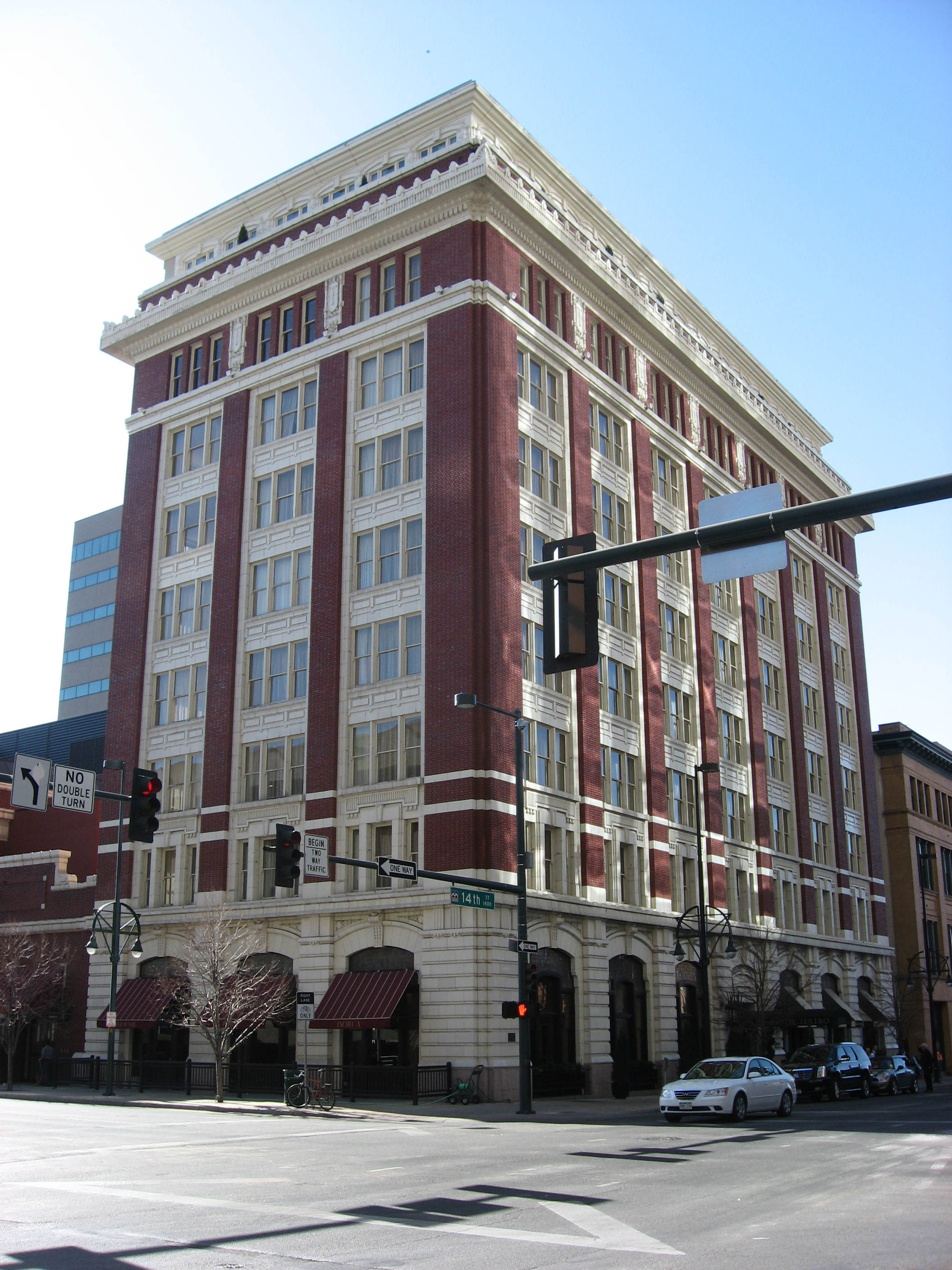
Tramway Building, Denver, 1911, Fisher & Fisher

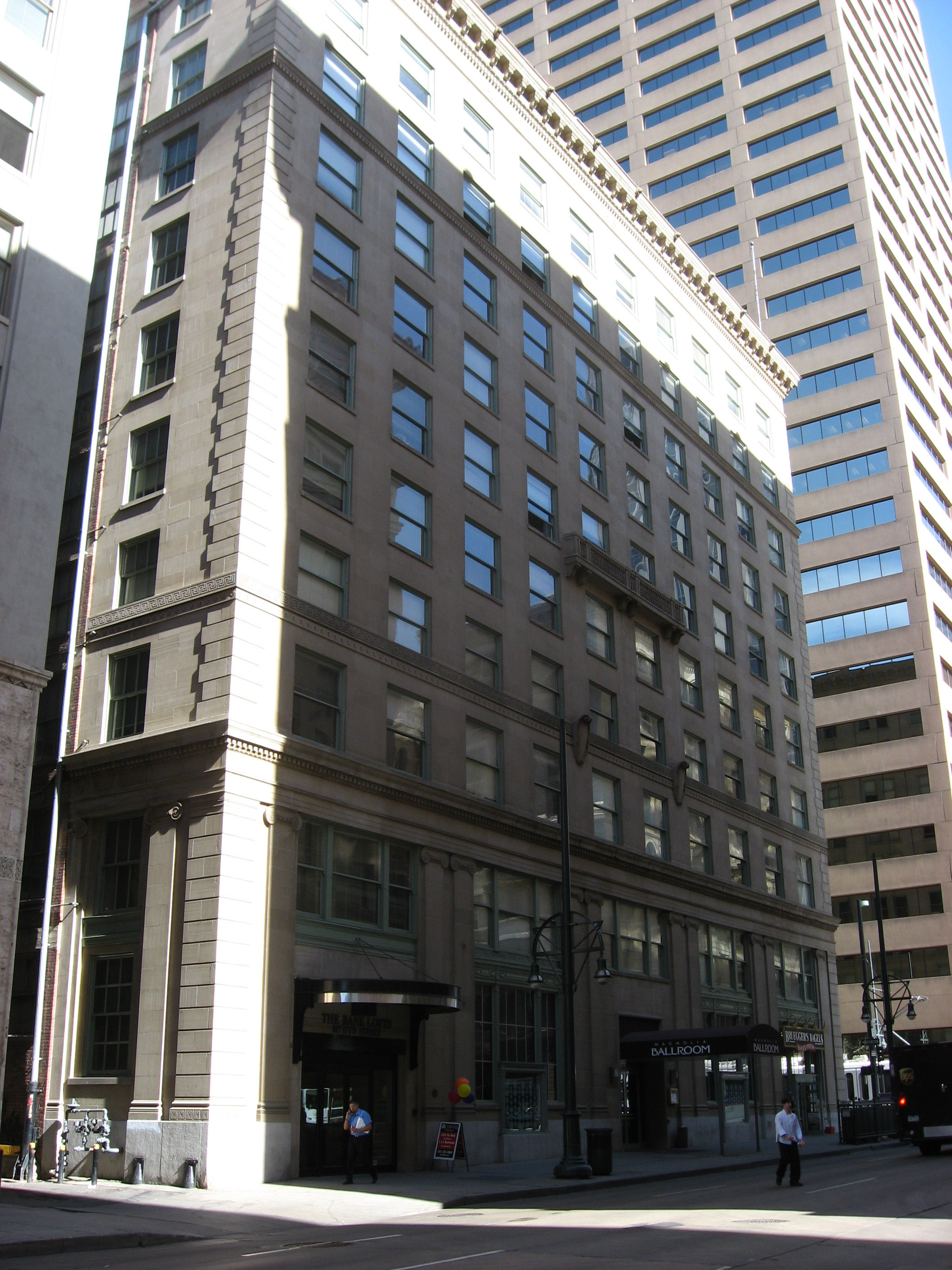
U.S. National Bank / Guaranty Bank, Denver, 1921, Fisher & Fisher

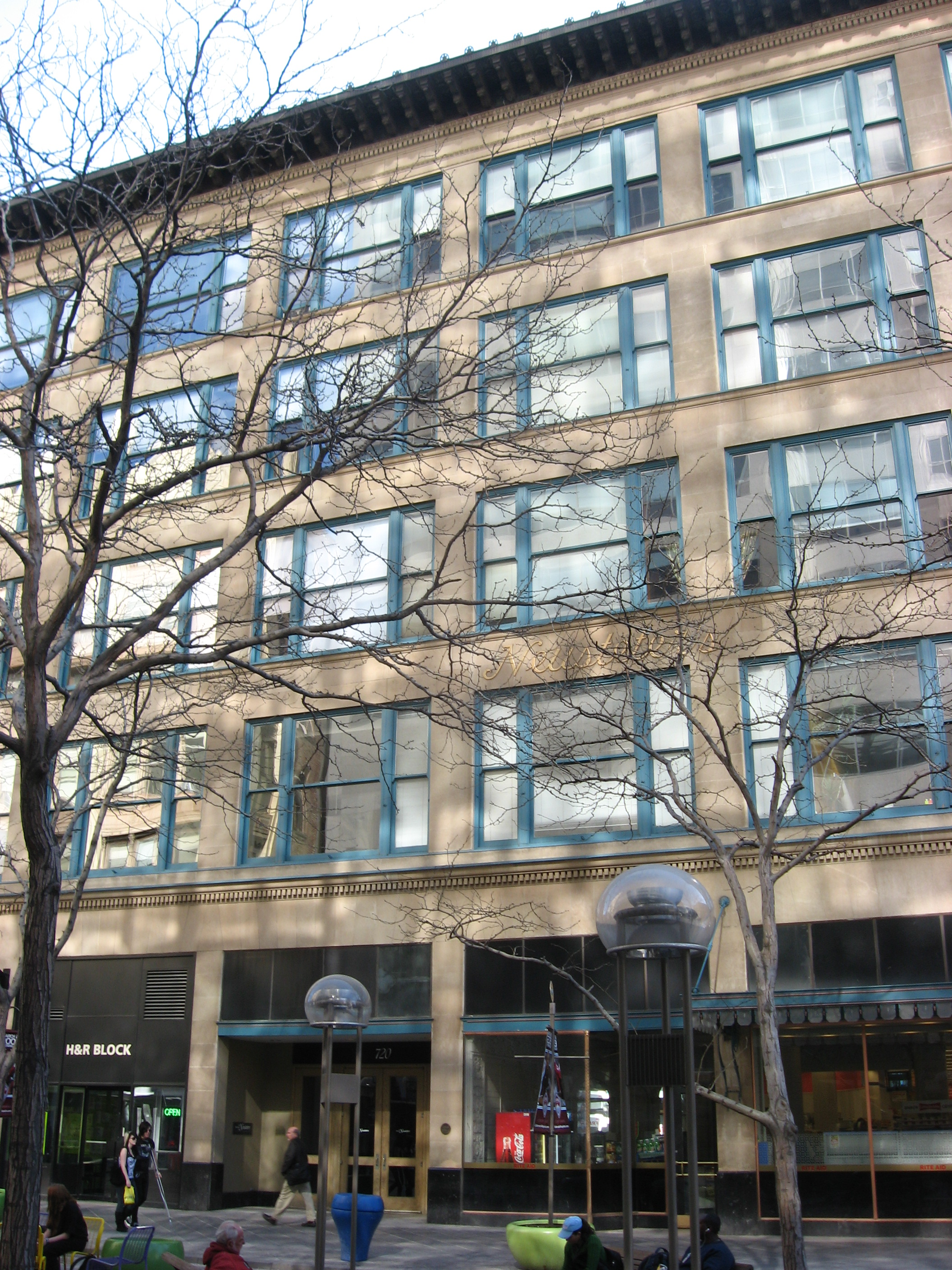
Neusteter Building, Denver, 1924, Fisher & Fisher

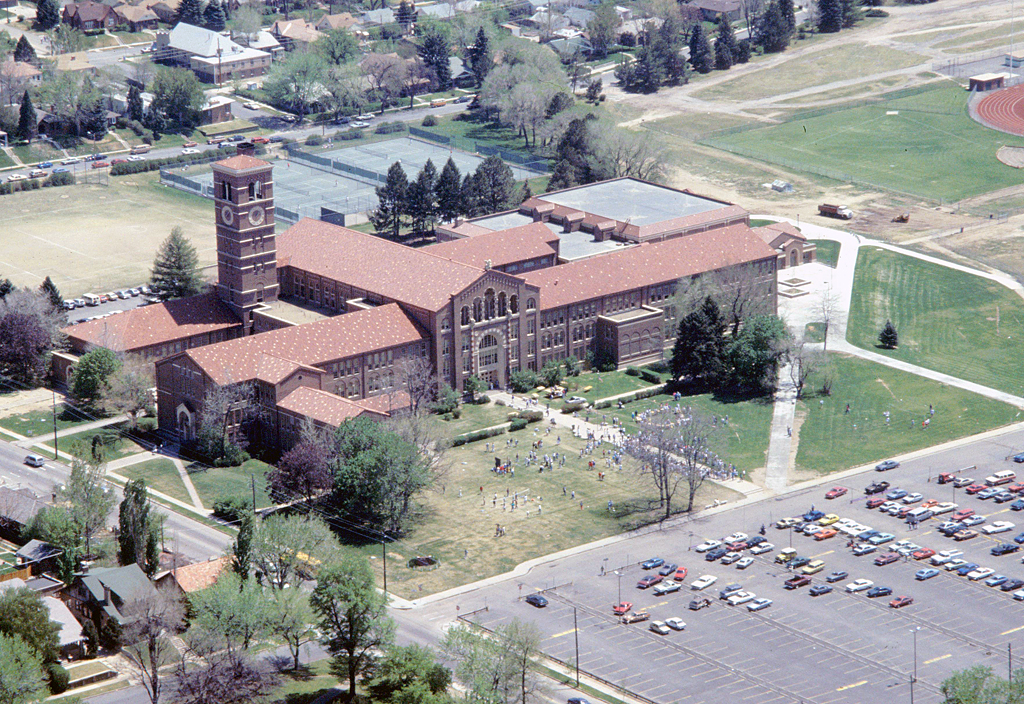
South High School, Denver, 1924, Fisher & Fisher

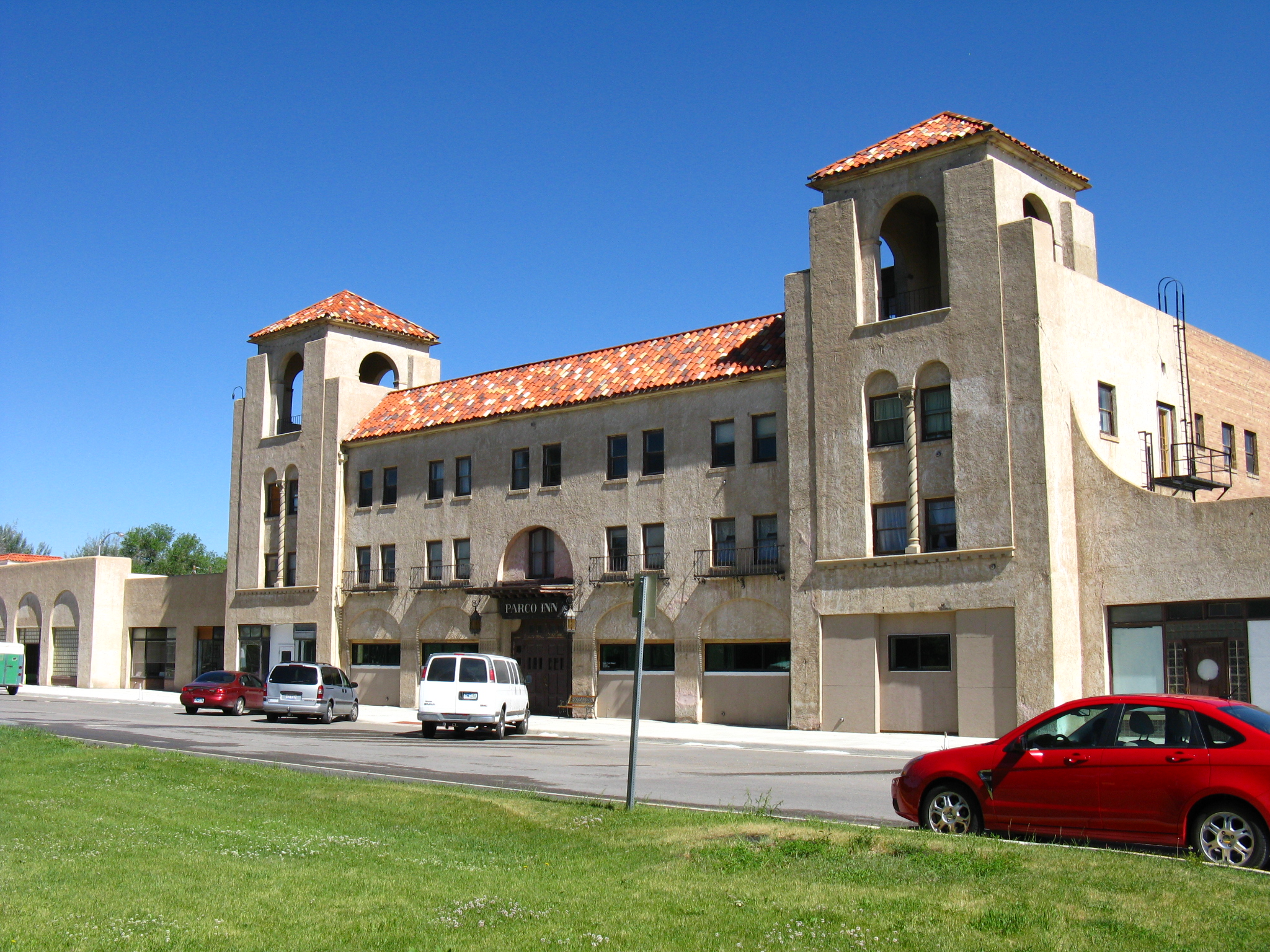
Parco Inn, Sinclair, Wyoming, 1924–25, Fisher & Fisher

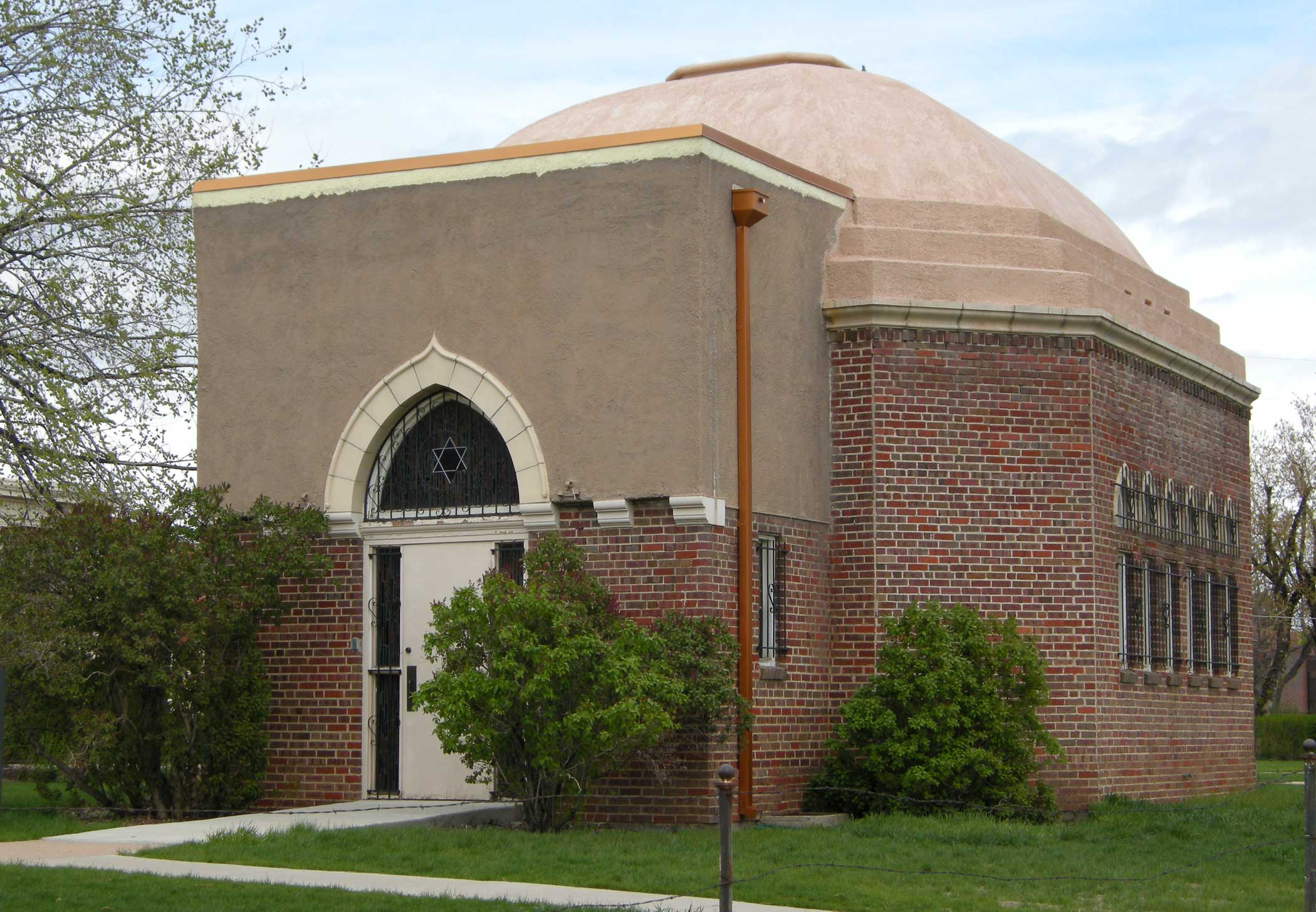
Isaac Solomon Synagogue, Lakewood, 1926, Fisher & Fisher

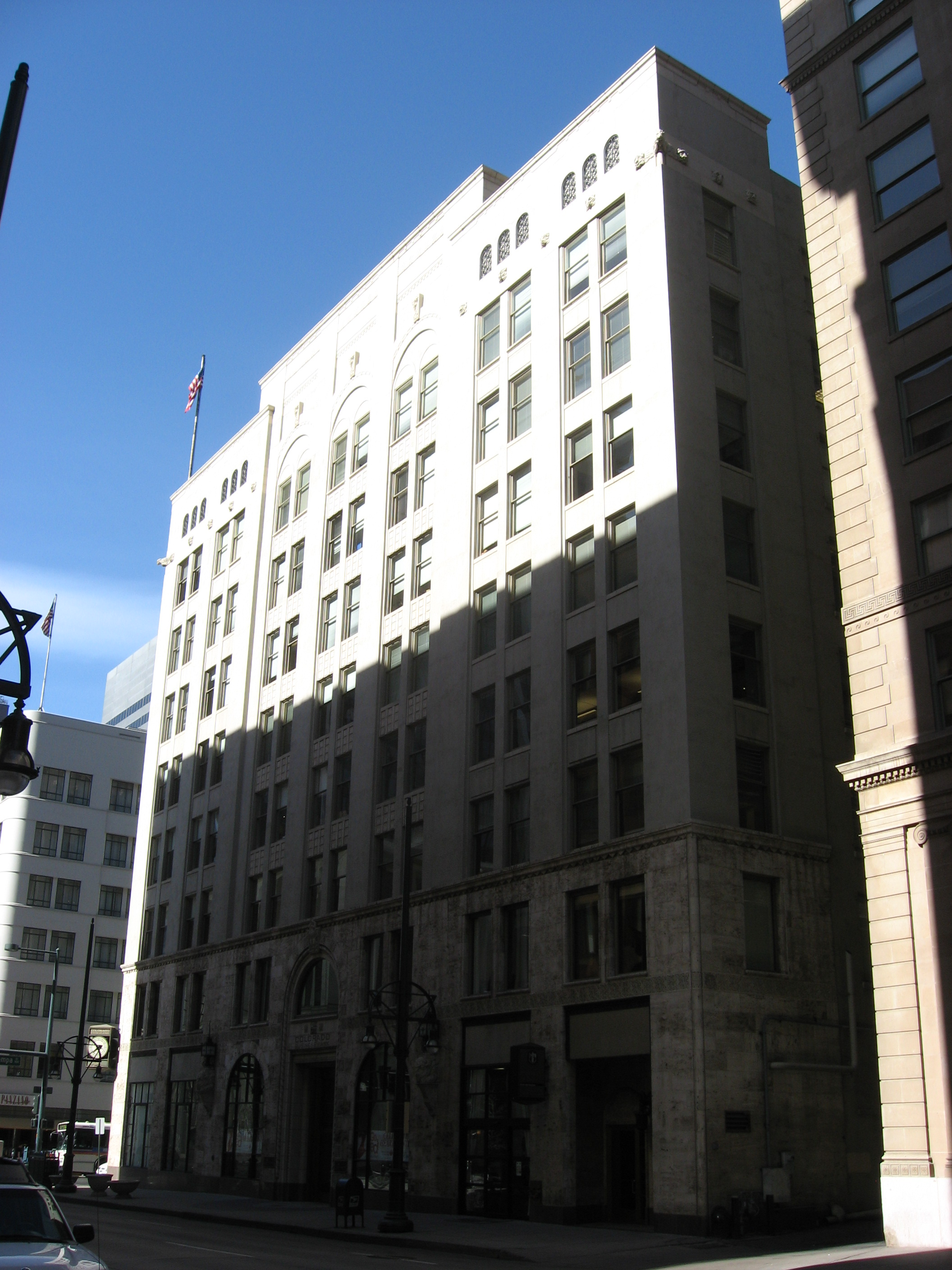
Ideal Building, Denver, adapted to bank 1927, Fisher & Fisher

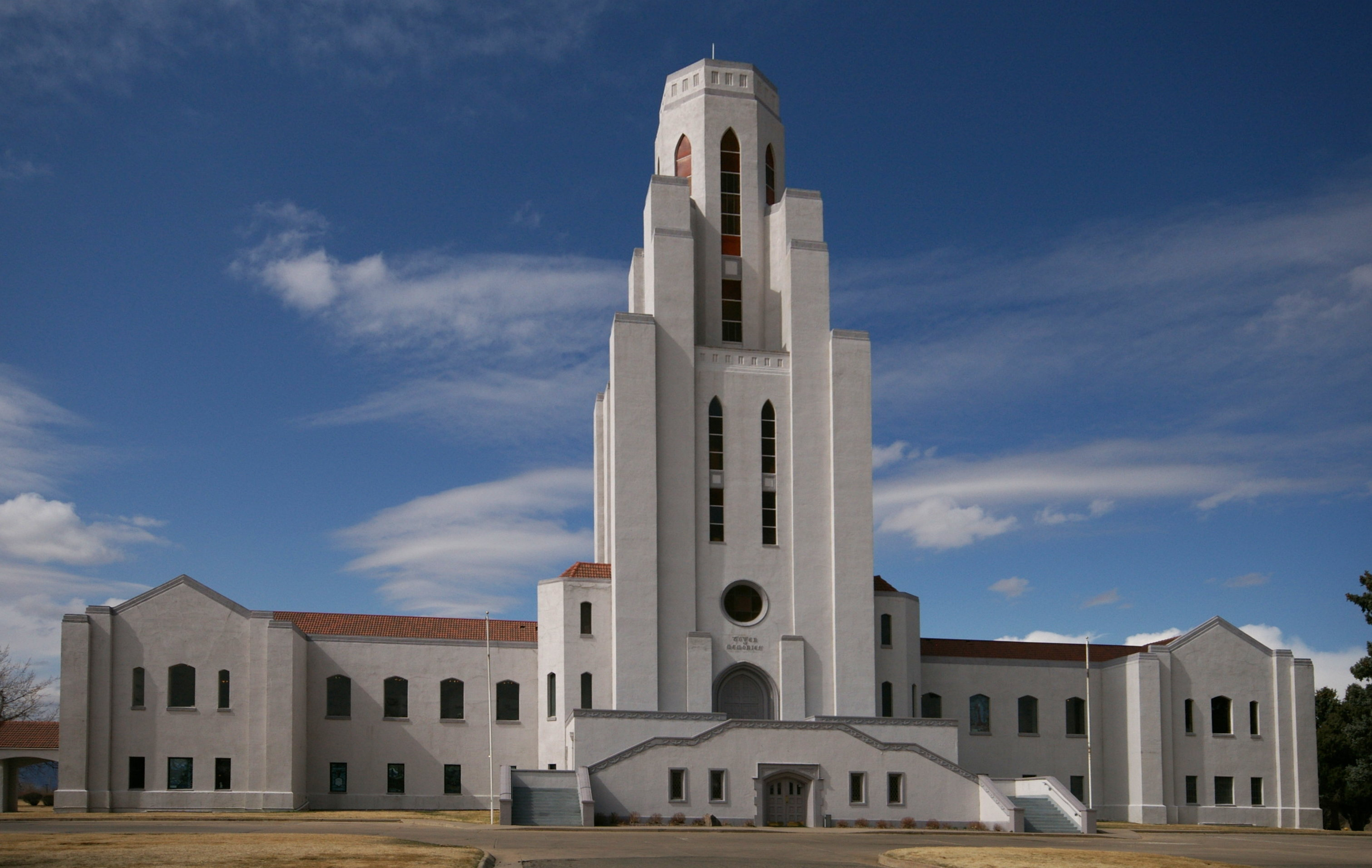
Tower of Memories, Wheat Ridge, 1928–, Fisher & Fisher

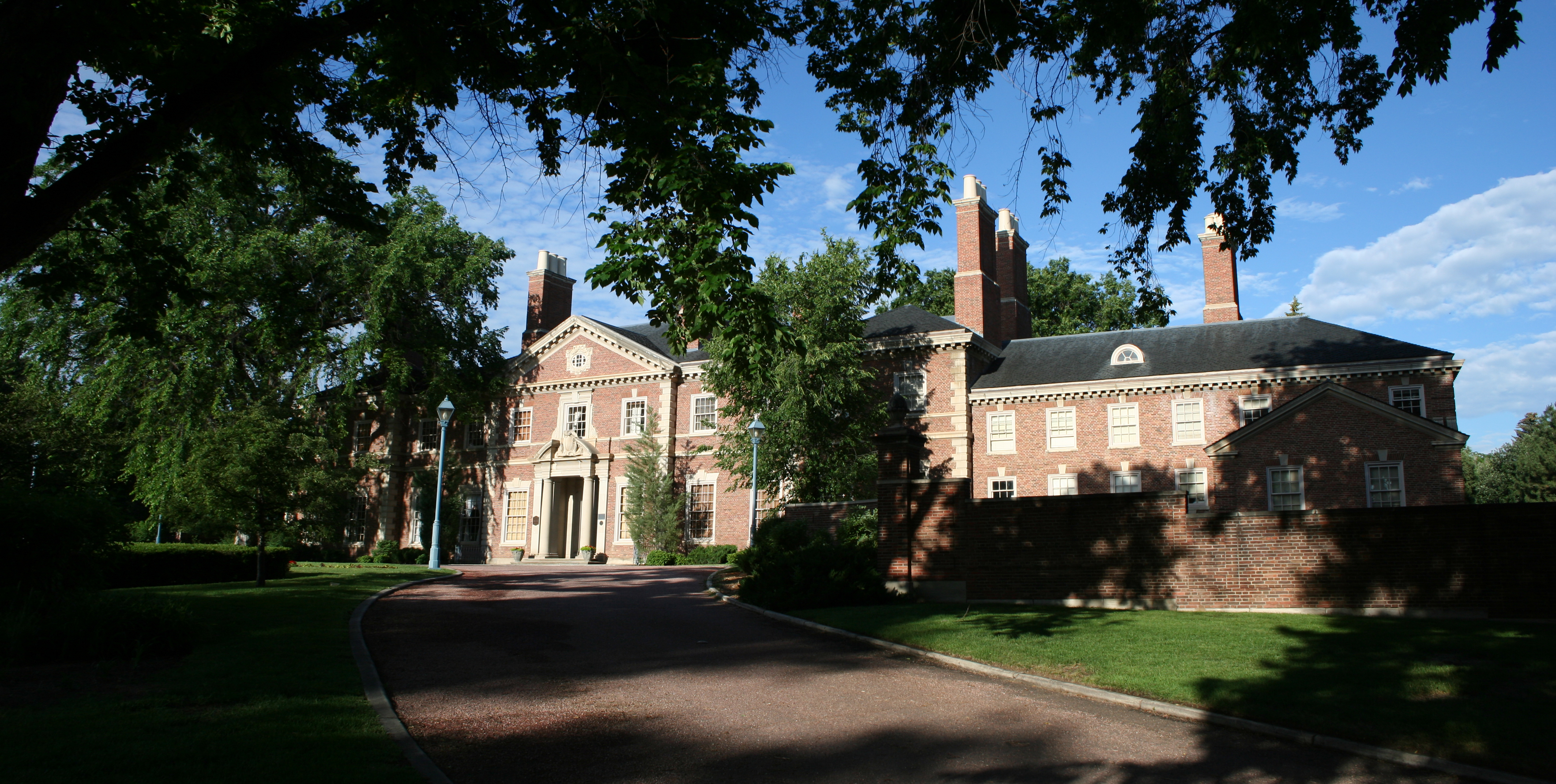
Phipps House, Denver, 1932, Fisher & Fisher
