= Wall Street West =

US financial centers outside of New York City

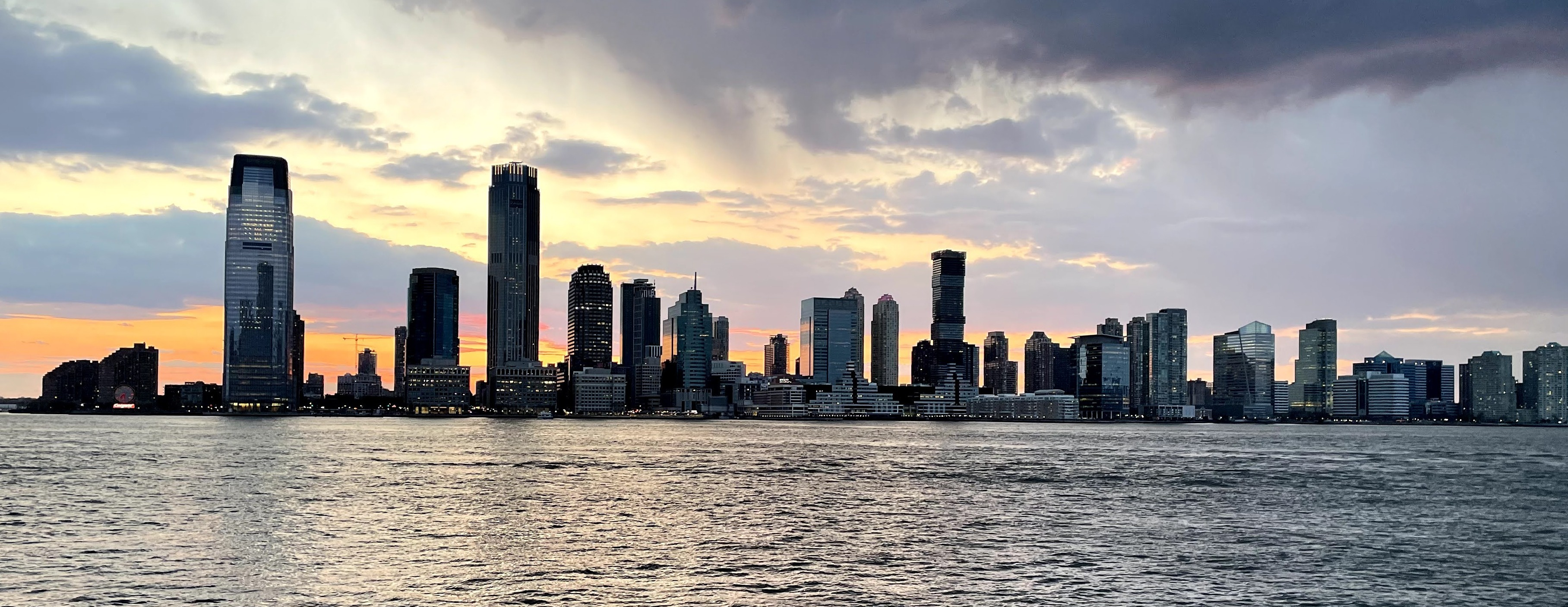
Downtown Jersey City's waterfront, located on the Hudson River, is dubbed Wall Street West.

Wall Street West is a name used by real estate developers, city officials, and news media in the United States to call particular streets or places west of Manhattan, New York City that have a high concentration of Wall Street financial companies or a major exchange. The most notable for that is along the Hudson River waterfront of Jersey City, New Jersey. By the early 2020s, economic development in Jersey City has led to median rent being among the highest of any city in the United States.

== Jersey City ==
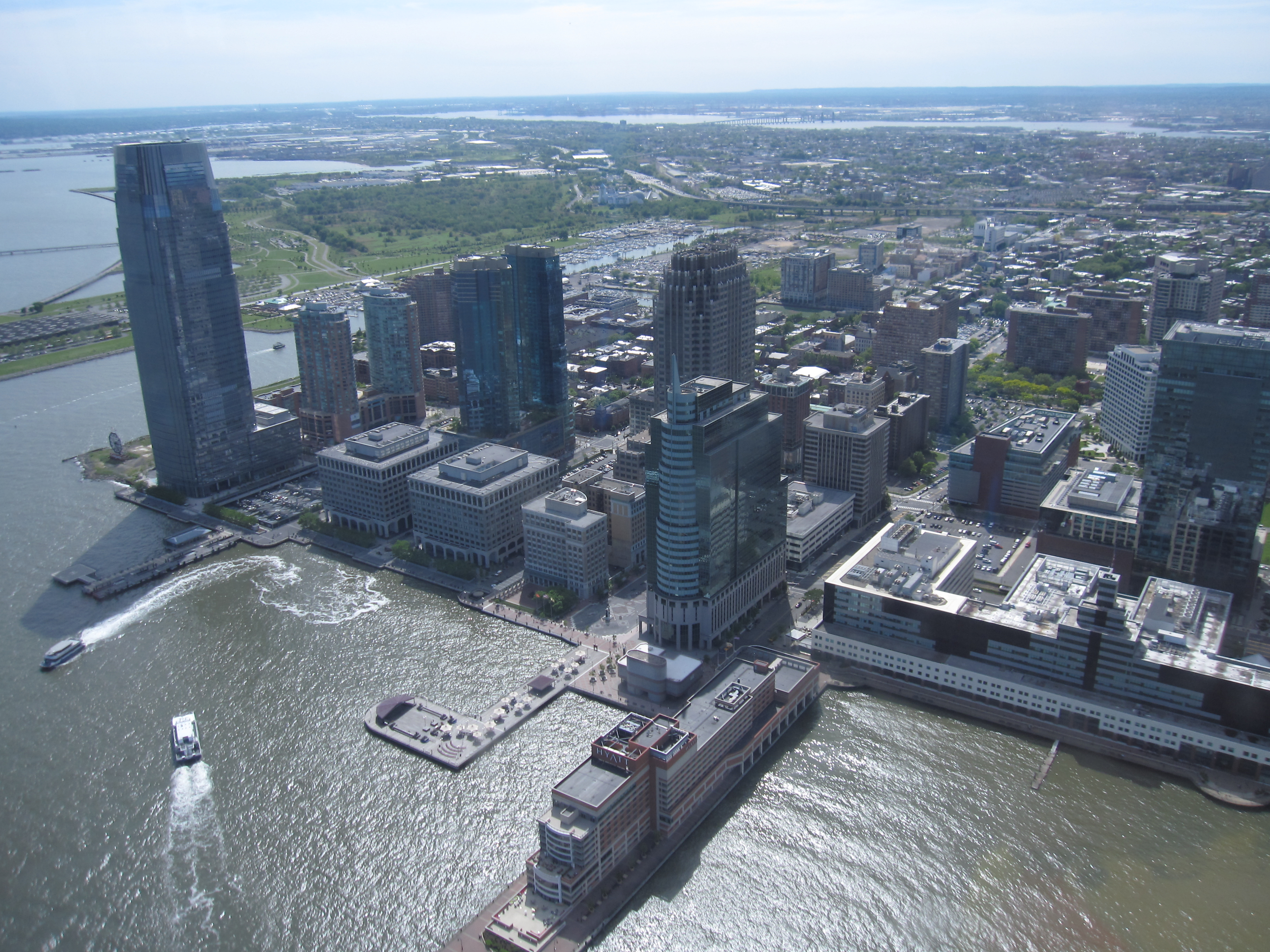
Exchange Place, the southern part of Wall Street West in Jersey City, in 2010

In the 1980s, some financial companies started moving from Manhattan to the west of the Hudson River to settle along the waterfront of Jersey City, New Jersey. The area earned the name "Wall Street West" after Bankers Trust had a major relocation to it in 1985. Other major financial firms followed shortly after with National Westminster Bank of London building its domestic subsidiary there. Donaldson, Lufkin & Jenrette (DLJ) moved into a new 20-story building in the Exchange Place area. The new Harborside Financial Center was built with anticipation of more relocations. Daiwa Securities, Royal Bank of Canada, and Chase Manhattan Bank were planning to have their major workforce there.

Another major development in Exchange Place started with a plan to redevelop the 34-acre former Colgate-Palmolive soap factory in 1988. The first building was 101 Hudson Street with more than 3,000 back-office workers of Merrill Lynch and Lehman Brothers moved in by 1993.

On the northern end of Jersey City's waterfront, another major development called Newport was started in the late 1980s. It was planned as a mixed-use community with office, residential and retail buildings. By early 2001, Newport had gained major tenants including UBS, Knight Capital, and Insurance Services Office By that time, the "Wall Street West" expanded to include the entire waterfront area from Newport to Exchange Place.

After the September 11 attacks, there were renewed interests from financial firms to diversify their workforce to be outside of Manhattan. At the same time, there was an immediate need to find office space for misplaced workers who used to work in the Lower Manhattan area. Office space in Jersey City's waterfront became boom again due to its proximity to Lower Manhattan and the ferry services which were not affected by the attacks. By the end of September 2001, ten of the largest 18 firms from the World Trade Center area including American Express and Deutsche Bank moved some of their operations to Jersey City. Goldman Sachs at the time were planning to move its headquarters to the new building being constructed in Jersey City.

The boom since 2001 was short-lived. By 2007, the vacancy rate had increased and some financial firms had scaled down their plans. UBS changed their plans to fully occupy the newly constructed building. Goldman Sachs only partially occupied its building and planned to build a new headquarters in New York. Wall Street West suffered further by the 2008 financial crisis. The office space vacancy rate spiked as investment bank tenants started collapsing. The downturn economy dampened real estate growth in the area for many years.

As the economy started to recover between 2011 and 2012, large leases started to pick up again, especially in the Newport area with major financial institutions such as Citigroup and Fidelity Investments. Depository Trust & Clearing Corporation also moved the majority of its workforce from Manhattan to Jersey City.

Currently, "Wall Street West" employment contributes to one-third of the private sector jobs in Jersey City. Within the Financial Service cluster, there are three major sectors: more than 60 percent are in the securities industry; 20 percent are in banking; and 8 percent in insurance.

== Northeastern Pennsylvania ==
After the September 11 attacks, the U.S. Securities and Exchange Commission, the Federal Reserve and the Office of the Comptroller of the Currency recommended that the data backup facilities of Wall Street firms should be moved away from New York City with a different power grid, transportation network and watershed than New York. In 2006, Governor of Pennsylvania, Ed Rendell, announced the creation of "Wall Street West" initiative to attract 20 potential Wall Street firms to move their backup facilities to Northeastern Pennsylvania in nine counties: Northampton, Berks, Monroe, Carbon, Pike, Wayne, Luzerne and Lackawanna. He also pledged to invest in office space construction, infrastructure improvement and installation of fiber optic cable from New York City to the region. The region was chosen as it was still within 125 miles (201 km) from Manhattan which was considered far enough to sustain a major disaster but still within the range of instantaneous data transmission via fiber optics. The first project was Penn Regional Business Center in Monroe County.

At the beginning of the initiative, Ben Franklin Technology Partners of Northeast Pennsylvania (BFTP/NEP), a state-funded economic development network, worked closely with the Pennsylvania Department of Labor and Industry and Community and Economic Development to develop a proposal for the federal grants through Workforce Innovation in Regional Economic Development (WIRED). The management was later turned to an independent unit called Wall Street West with a 17-member Executive Committee.

In June 2007, the initiative received an $8 million commitment from Level 3 Communications for a $40 million project to build a new fiber optic network from Manhattan to East Stroudsburg with a branched-off network in Warren County in New Jersey. This was to address the shortcoming of direct high-speed communication which was required by Wall Street firms. However, by June 2008, the initiative was unable to attract any Wall Street firm to the region with an exception of one financial services related company. A company which hosted compliance solutions for financial services opened its new data center in the region with 10 job creation. By that time, Level 3 Communications indicated that it would not build the fiber optic link unless more financial services firms commit to locate in the region and buy services from them. Part of the difficulties in attracting more companies was that many financial institutions were more comfortable with the shorter range of 70 kilometres (43 mi) from Manhattan which caused many financial firms to build out their new data centers in Central New Jersey instead.

Without a commitment from financial services companies, the decision was made in 2009 to expand the Wall Street West mission to include healthcare, advanced materials and diversified manufacturing, and logistics and transportation industries.

== "Wall Street of the West" ==
=== San Francisco ===
Montgomery Street in San Francisco's financial district

For those locations in the Western United States, the name "Wall Street of the West" has been used in the latter part of the 19th century. Montgomery Street in San Francisco has been known by that nickname to date. Other places were known by that name for a period of time until the industry moved out to other areas.

Montgomery Street in San Francisco started its transformation from the street with wood shacks, warehouses and retail stores in the 1850s. By the 1870s, more notable buildings were constructed to replace the old wood shacks and the mud flats. The street continued to develop from that point with financial services companies located in that area. The Montgomery Street has been known as "Wall Street of the West" to date. The Financial District has been expanded to cover the triangular area east of Grant Avenue, south of Washington Street, west of the Embarcadero. In 2012, when the Occupy movement had a protest at San Francisco's Financial District as a continuation of Occupy San Francisco, the protesters went through the financial district under the banner Occupy Wall Street West giving the shorter name of the financial district than its typical name as Wall Street of the West.

However, the COVID-19 pandemic in the United States accelerated a continuing exodus of business from the downtown core of San Francisco. Significantly high levels of crime and homelessness have become more prominent features of the financial district and neighboring Union Square. Theories advanced range from crime, drugs, and homelessness, to the West Coast's and particularly San Francisco's challenge to remain a relevant commercial and financial center given its relative geographic isolation from other North American commercial centers in a era of increasingly ubiquitous e-commerce.

=== Denver ===
For Denver, Colorado, the city started picking up some shares of commercial buildings in the late 19th century. There was a push by the local politicians to transform its Seventeenth Street to become the "Wall Street of Denver" as seen in an 1892 pamphlet in promoting the Equitable Building by the Equitable Life Assurance Society. Other buildings were constructed at other corners of 17th Street such as the Boston Building in 1890 and the Ideal Cement Building in 1907. By that time, 17th Street had begun to be referred to as the "Wall Street of the West." After the Colorado National Bank (First National Bank) was constructed in 1911, it reaffirmed its central business district's Wall Street status. 17th Street was also called the "Wall Street of the Rockies" at a later time as it attracted other premier financial institutions.

=== Los Angeles ===
Los Angeles also picked up a share of financial companies starting in the early part of the 1900s. The new financial buildings were concentrating along South Spring Street. The title of "Wall Street of the West" was used and the Spring Street Financial District was born. The district continued to flourish for many decades until the 1960s when companies started shifting toward the western part of the downtown area. By the early 1980s, partly due to bank mergers and consolidations, many buildings were empty and the Spring Street showed no sign of its past as one of the financial centers.

=== Fort Worth ===
Fort Worth, Texas was known as the "Wall Street of the West" starting in the early 1900s similarly to Los Angeles's South Spring Street. However, it was not the financial companies that gave Fort Worth Stockyards its Wall Street name, but the livestock trading. In 1902, the Livestock Exchange Building was constructed to house many livestock commission companies, telegraph offices, railroad offices and other support businesses. The business grew to the peak at 1944 which processed 5,277,496 head of livestock. After that year, the livestock exchange business started to decline until its low point in 1986. The Livestock Exchange Building is now a historical site.
