= Foster-Buell Estate =

Historic location in Colorado, US

- U.S. National Register of Historic Places
- U.S. Historic district
- Colorado State Register of Historic Properties
- Nearest city: 2700 E. Hampden Ave., Cherry Hills Village, Colorado
- Coordinates: 39°38′50″N 104°57′1″W
- Area: 3.6 acres (1.5 ha)
- Architects: William and Arthur Fisher
- Architectural style: Colonial Revival
- NRHP reference No.: 98000294
- CSRHP No.: 5AH.222
- Added to NRHP: April 1, 1998

The Foster-Buell Estate is a home located at 2700 E. Hampden Ave. in Cherry Hills Village, Colorado, United States. It is an example of Colonial revival architecture built in 1920. The architects were William Ellsworth Fisher and his brother Arthur Addison Fisher (Fisher & Fisher). The grounds were landscaped by Saco DeBoer. It was first the residence of Alexis C. Foster and then the home of architect Temple Buell.

== See also ==
- National Register of Historic Places listings in Arapahoe County, Colorado
