= Bank Lofts =

- US National Bank
- U.S. National Register of Historic Places
- Colorado State Register of Historic Properties
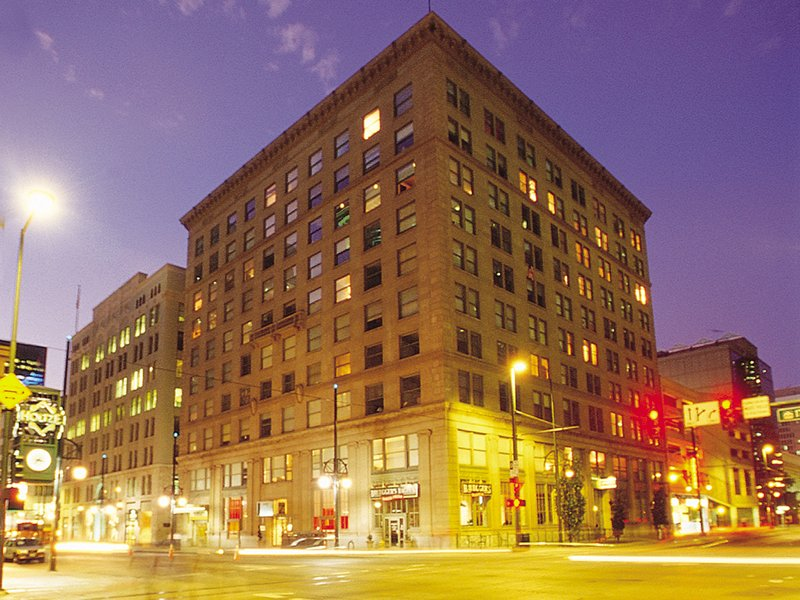

- Location within Colorado Location within the United States
- Location: 817 17th St; Denver, Colorado 80202; United States
- Coordinates: 39°44′49″N 104°59′32″W
- Built: 1921
- Architect: William and Fisher & Fisher
- Architectural style: Chicago Commercial
- NRHP reference No.: 94000264
- CSRHP No.: 5DV.5300
- Added to NRHP: March 25, 1994

The Bank Lofts is a building in Denver, Colorado. Constructed in 1921, the building is listed on the National Register of Historic Places.

== History ==
Originally the US National/Guaranty Bank Building, the Bank Lofts (also known as the United States National Bank Building, US National Bank Building, Guaranty Bank Building) were designed by Arthur Addison Fisher and William Ellsworth Fisher (Fisher & Fisher) and built in 1921. The Fishers also designed other notable Denver landmarks, such as the Denver City Tramway Building at 1100 14th Street and the A. C. Foster Building at 912 16th Street. Located at 817 17th street, the Bank Lofts are a reserved architectural example of the Chicago Commercial style. The 10-story (40.23 meters high) building's façade is covered in smooth ashlar limestone and features an ornamental bronze storefront. In the 1980s, the building sat vacant and was almost demolished, but on March 25, 1994 it was listed on the National Register of Historic Places under the Historic Resources of Downtown Denver Multiple Property Submission (building number: 5DV.5300), and was subsequently renovated in 1995. The renovation costs exceeded $10.9 million, and were financed via historic rehabilitation and low-income housing tax credits and a grant from the Colorado Historical Society, along with TIF assistance from DURA. The building was reconfigured into renter-occupied apartment lofts in 1996.

Today, The Bank Lofts reside in Denver's historic district, located in the heart of downtown Denver next to LoDo and the 16th Street Mall. It is surrounded by other historic landmark buildings, such as the Boston Building (which has been converted to the Boston Lofts), the American National Bank Building, and the Denver National Bank Building. It currently houses 117 residential apartment lofts, which feature original artistic details and historic characteristics (i.e., crown molding, vaulted ceilings, etc....). The property is owned and managed by Apartment Investment and Management Company – also known as Aimco (stock ticker AIV).

== Tenants ==
In addition to the apartment lofts, the building houses 11,293 square feet (1,049.2 m^{2}) of retail space; currently occupied by Bruegger's Bagels, The Magnolia Ballroom, and Three Sisters’ Café and Catering.

== Gallery ==
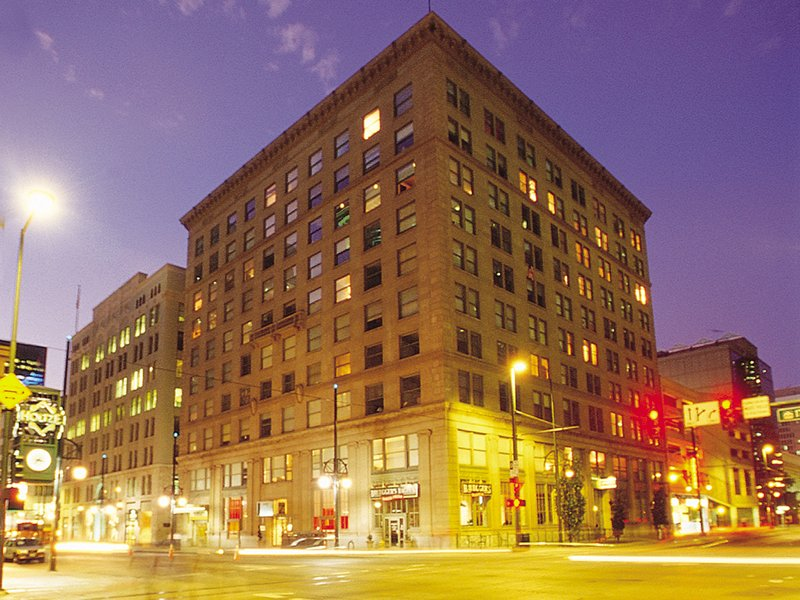
The historic Bank Building is located in the heart of downtown Denver.

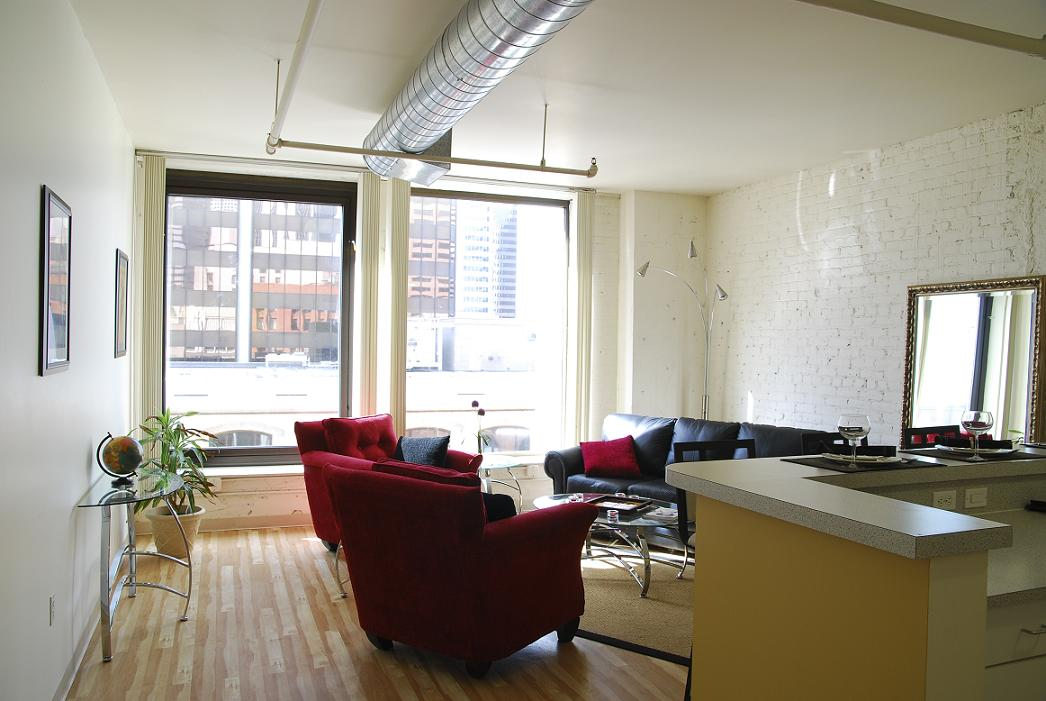
An example of the Bank Building's converted loft spaces.

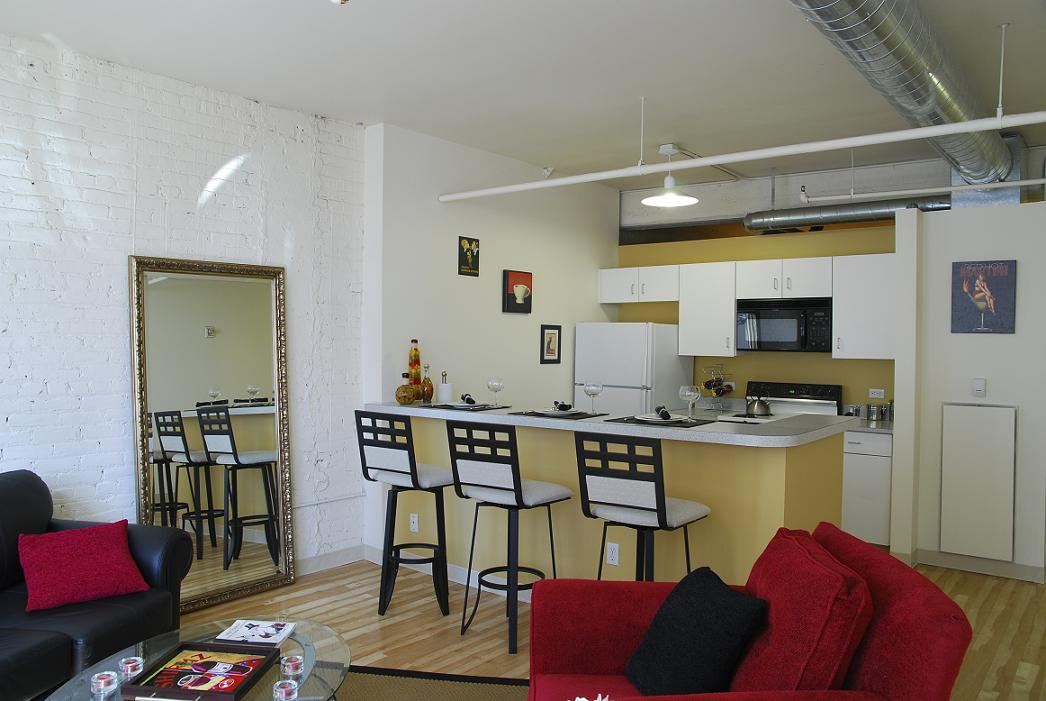
An example of the Bank Building's converted loft spaces and windows.

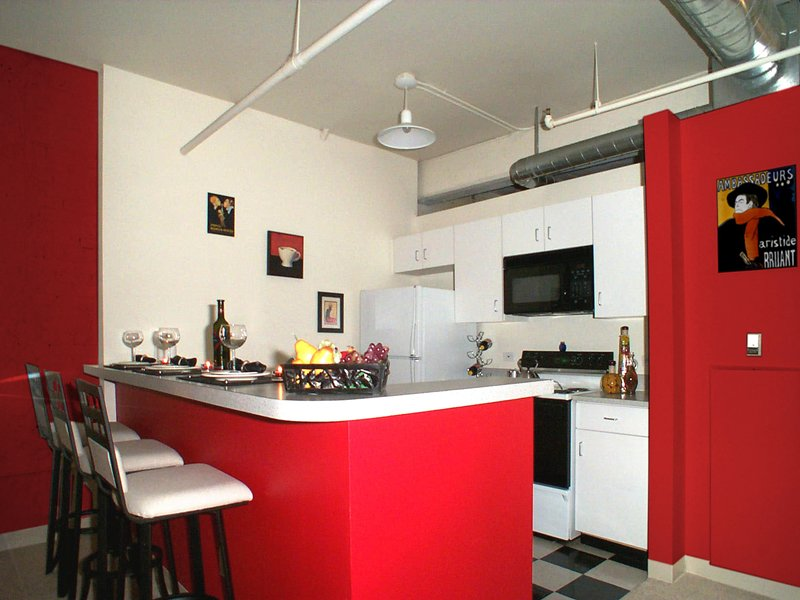
A converted kitchen in the historic Bank Building.

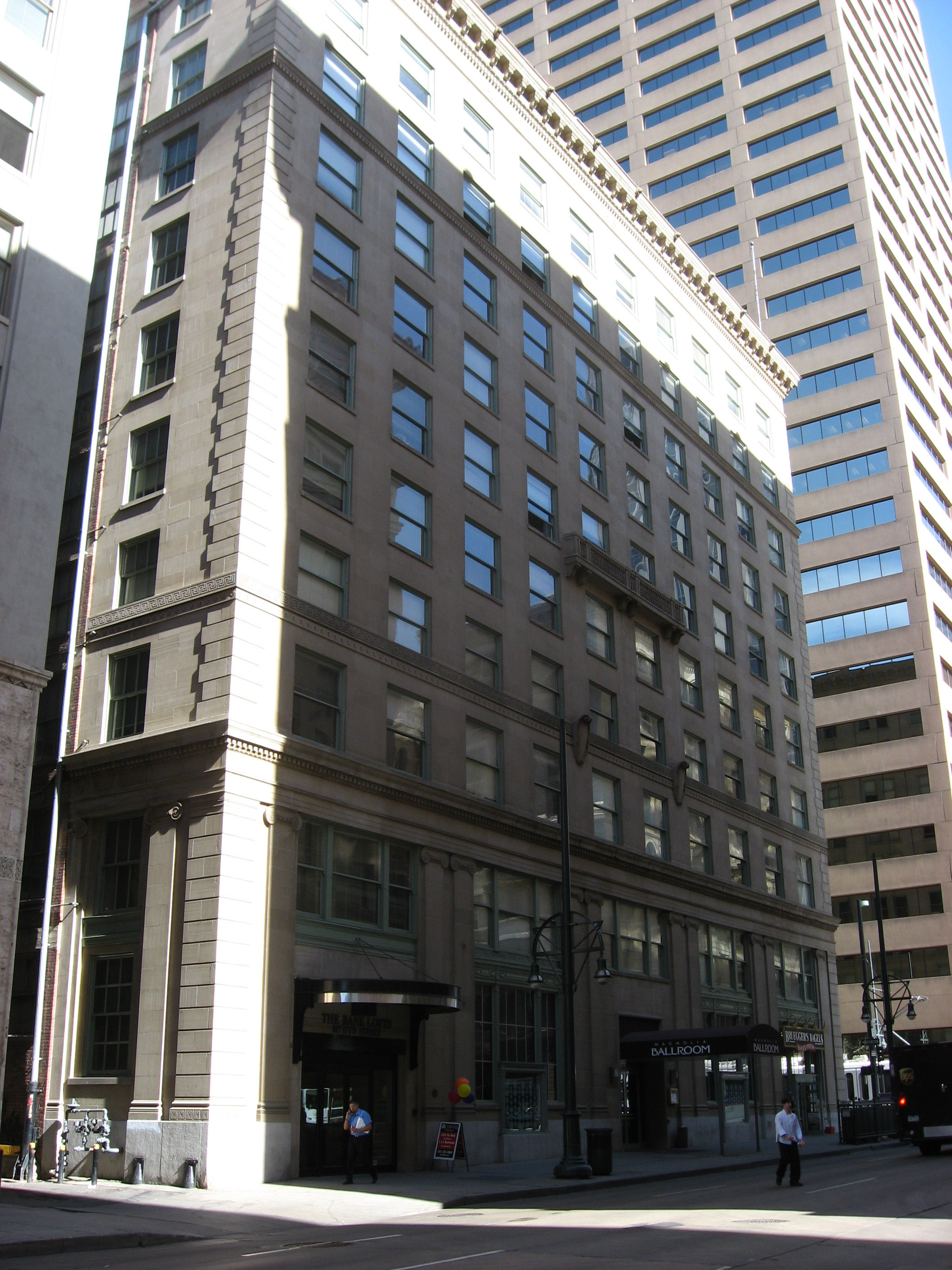

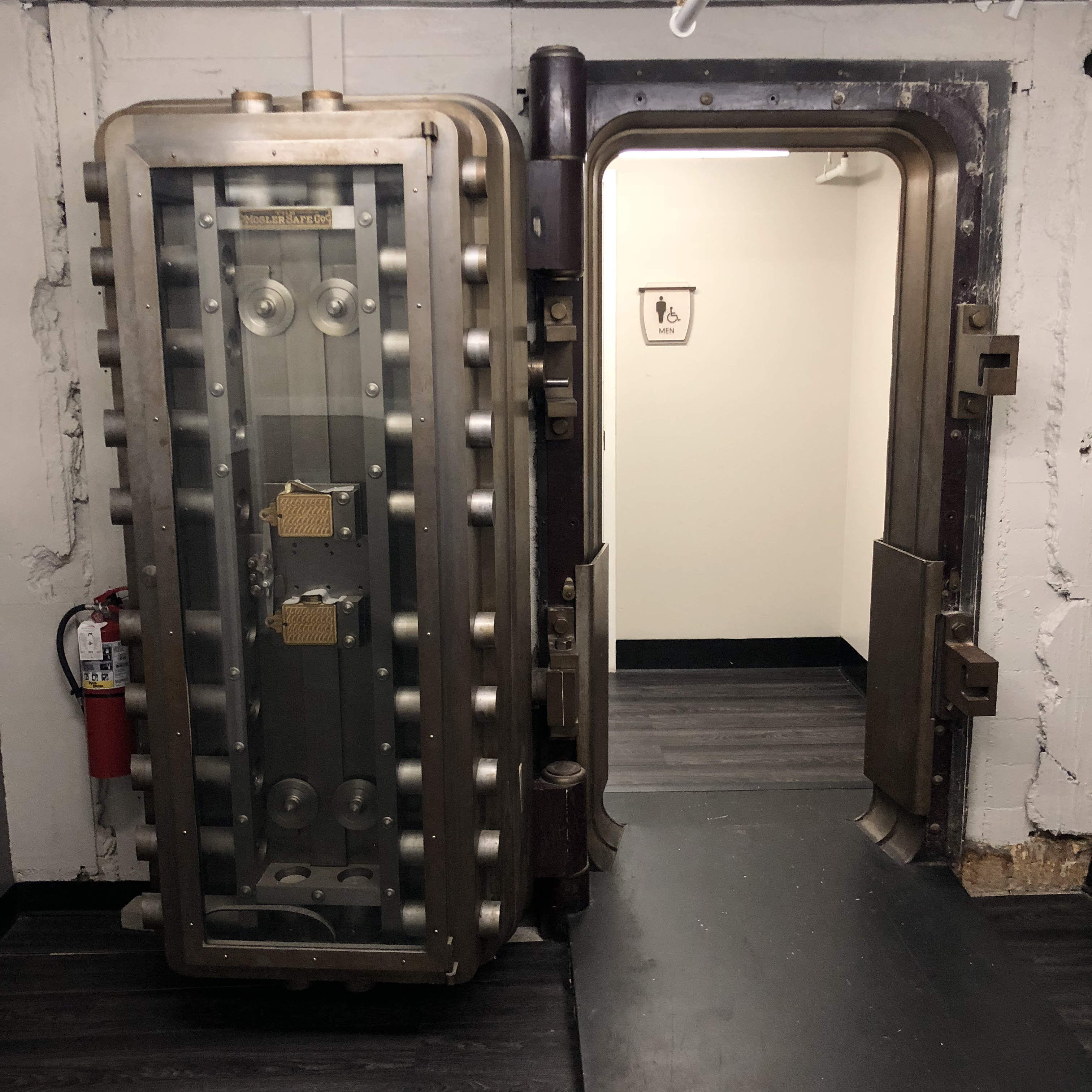
The first floor retail tenants share a men's restroom which was converted from the former bank vault, still with the vault door.
