= St. Thomas Episcopal Church (Alamosa, Colorado) =

Historic church in Colorado, United States

- U.S. National Register of Historic Places
- Colorado State Register of Historic Properties
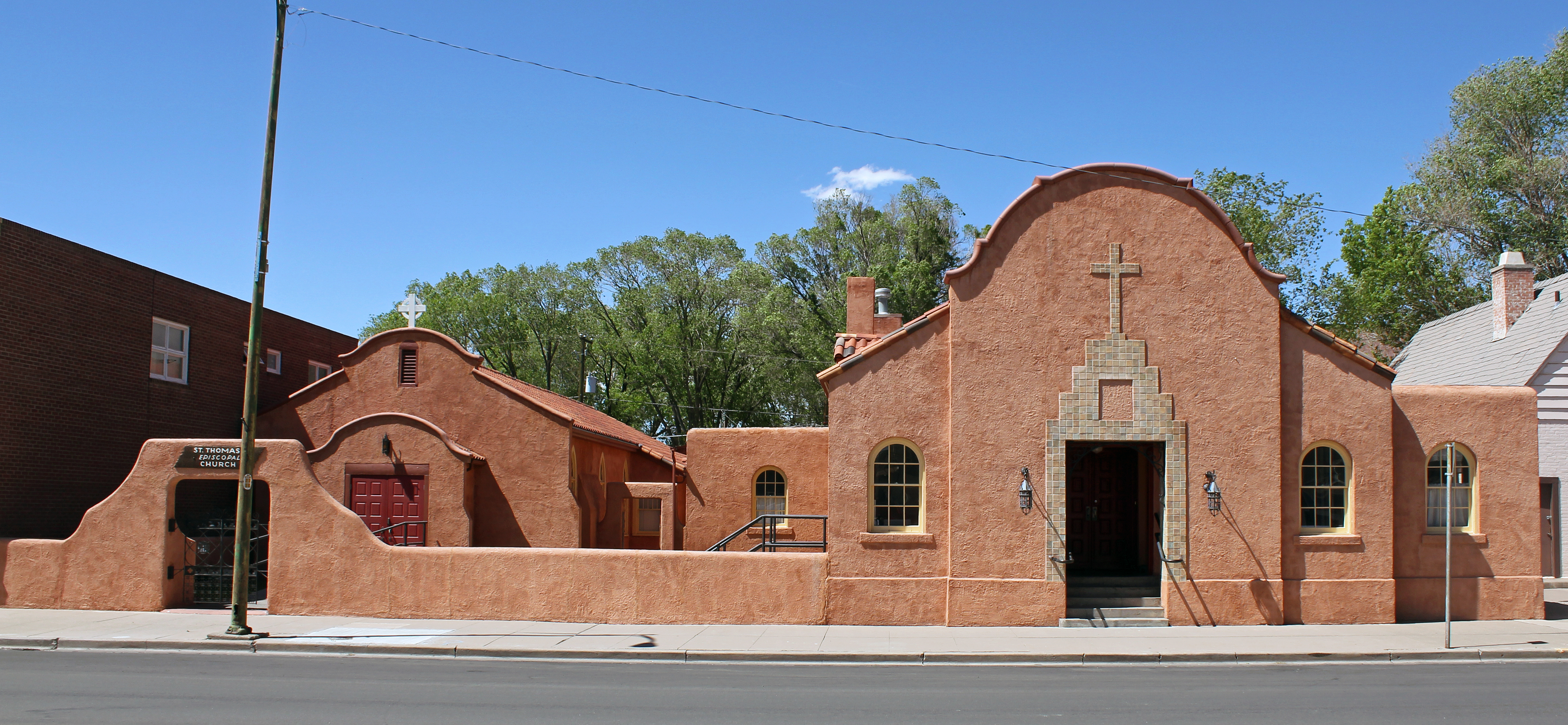

- Location within Colorado Location within the United States
- Location: 607 Fourth St., Alamosa, Colorado
- Coordinates: 37°28′10″N 105°51′57″W
- Area: less than one acre
- Built: 1926, 1930
- Architect: William Ellsworth Fisher; Arthur Addison Fisher
- Architectural style: Mission/Spanish Revival
- NRHP reference No.: 03000285
- CSRHP No.: 5AL.260
- Added to NRHP: April 22, 2003

The St. Thomas Episcopal Church in Alamosa, Colorado is a historic Mission Revival-style church at 607 Fourth Street. It was built in 1926 and was added to the National Register of Historic Places in 2003.

A church was built on the site in 1882, but was demolished in 1930 when a sanctuary addition was created. The church's parish hall was built in 1926, designed by Denver architects William Ellsworth Fisher and Arthur Addison Fisher.
