= Wall Street West (organization) =

Charitable partnership between the US Treasury and Wall Street firms

Wall Street West was a not-for-profit partnership in Northeastern Pennsylvania that enhanced the financial services, information technology and related industries in the commonwealth through strategic workforce development and state-of-the-art economic development. Stemming from an interagency report by the Securities and Exchange Commission (SEC), the Federal Reserve and the U.S. Department of the Treasury – whose recommendations make the nine-county region an optimal geographic location for secure data back-up and back office operations – the goal of Wall Street West was to work with firms in New York City and the surrounding metropolitan threat zones to establish supplemental facilities to safeguard data, fund the education and training of a growing workforce, and expand the competitiveness and potential of these industries.

The Wall Street West partnership was made up of the top-tier economic development agencies; technology investment groups; workforce development organizations; education and research institutions; and private sector companies in the region. Wall Street West was an independent unit under the Ben Franklin Technology Partners of Northeastern Pennsylvania. The unit had federal support through a $15 million Workforce Innovation in Regional Economic Development (WIRED) grant from the U.S. Department of Labor for education and job training, as well as a combined $24 million commitment by the U.S. Department of Commerce, the Pennsylvania Department of Community and Economic Development, and private industry to enhance existing infrastructure.

At the end of 2009, the partnership's state-administered federal grant expired.

== Sources ==
- http://www.wallstreetwest.org
- http://www.interviewNEPA.com
