= Gladys Caldwell Fisher =

American sculptor

- Born: Gladys Caldwell; April 6, 1907; Loveland, Colorado
- Died: April 18, 1952 (aged 45)
- Known for: Sculpture
- Movement: Treasury Relief Art Project

Gladys Caldwell Fisher (April 6, 1907 – April 18, 1952) was an American sculptor and animalier, born in Loveland, Colorado and based in Denver. Best known in Colorado, she was nationally recognized for her work.

== Early life and studies ==
Rocky Mountain Sheep, Byron R. White United States Courthouse (1936)

Gladys Caldwell moved to Denver when she was eleven and attended East High School and Manual High School. While in school she joined began the study of sculpture at the Beaux-Arts Atelier in Denver. There she studies modeling with Denver sculptor Robert Garrison, composition with John E. Thompson, and art lessons from Allen Tupper True. She received a scholarship from the Denver Allied Arts Association in 1926, which allowed her to study in New York City with Alexander Archipenko. Another scholarship funded study in Paris at the Academie de la Grande Chaumiere to study with Jose de Creeft, Aristide Maillol, and George Hilbert. She made a small bust of Gertrude Stein under the mentorship of Maillol.

== Career ==
She returned to the United States in 1929 doing freelance work and teaching in New York. She returned to Denver in 1932 where she taught sculpture at the University of Denver and the Denver Art Museum.. She specialized in the sculpture of animals in stone and hardwood. To improve her depictions she studied their forms in their native habitats and at the Bronx Zoo and Denver Zoo.

In the 1930s and 1940s she produced sculptures for the Public Works of Art Project. Among them the American Indian Orpheus and the Animals (1934), a 10-foot high bas-relief located in the Denver City and County Building. Kiowa Travois (1939), a wood relief she created for the Las Animas, Colorado post office. She created two grizzly bear cubs for the Yellowstone National Park post office in Wyoming in 1941. She is best known for her two limestone Rocky Mountain sheep created as part of a Treasury Relief Art Project commission for the Byron White United States Courthouse in Denver, in 1936.

In 1937, she was asked to create a sculpture for the D.H. Larence Shrine located at the D.H. Lawrence Ranch near Taos New Mexico. She created Red Fox, titled after Lawrence's nickname given to him by local Native Americans on account of his red beard.

== Personal life ==
In 1936, she married well known Denver architect Alan Fisher.

== Exhibitions ==
- Salon des Independents (1929)
- Museum of Modern Art (1930)
- First National Exhibition of American Art, Rockefeller Center (1936)
- Whitney Museum of American Art (1936)
- New York Word's Fair (1939)
- Time and Place: One Hundred Years of Women Artists in Colorado, 1900–2000, Center for the Visual Arts, Denver (2000)

== Collections ==
- Denver Art Museum
- Denver Public Library Western Art Collection
- City and County of Denver
- Center for Southwest Research at the University of New Mexico Albuquerque
- Kirkland Museum of Find & Decorative Art, Denver
