= Alan Fisher (architect) =

American architect

Alan Berney Fisher (1905, Denver – 1978) was an American architect based in Denver, Colorado, working primarily for the firm of Fisher & Fisher founded by his father. He was active in historic preservation in the state.

In 1892, the firm that became Fisher and Fisher was founded by Alan Fisher's father, William Ellsworth Fisher. In 1907 the firm became "Fisher and Fisher" when William's brother, Arthur Addison Fisher, joined and it continued until Alan Fisher's death in 1978. Throughout the firm worked on dozens of notable buildings. Of 67 existing buildings in Denver credited to the Fisher firm, 50 are individually listed, within districts, or have been determined eligible for the National Register of Historic Places; three quarters of the firm's identifiable remaining work in the city. This makes this architectural firm's legacy unsurpassed by any other in Colorado. Rodney Davis was part of the firm for 11 years beginning in 1956, after which Alan Fisher partnered with John D. Reece and Hillary M. Johnson until his death in 1978. Among his own designs are the Ship Tavern in the Brown Palace Hotel, a nautical-themed pub that he designed in celebration of the repeal of Prohibition and the Sisters of Charity Postulate chapel in the Seton Center.

Becoming active in historic preservation, Alan Fisher was a founding member of the Denver Landmark Preservation Commission in 1967, and its chairman from 1970 to 1973. He renovated the Opera House in Central City, Colorado, recreating the musician's gallery it had originally had.

Fisher was an alumnus of the University of Pennsylvania and the Massachusetts Institute of Technology. He married the sculptor Gladys Caldwell Fisher in 1936.
