= Bio-1 =

- Founded: 2007
- Purpose: Biology, Biotechnology
- Location: (United States) New Brunswick, NJ
- Region served: Central New Jersey
- Method: Grants
- Key people: Mary Ellen Clark; Executive Director; Lisa Weisser; Communications & Outreach Specialist
- Website: www.bio-1stop.org

Bio-1 is a consortium of partners founded in 2007 designed to identify and promote bioscience in the Central New Jersey area. It is the result of a $5 million grant made available by the Workforce Innovation in Regional Economic Development (WIRED) program.

== Mission statement ==
Bio-1's goal is to make Central New Jersey (CNJ) the next “hot spot” for the global bioscience industry, by creating high-quality, high-paying jobs and a skilled workforce. The five-county BIO-1 partnership is named for the Route 1 corridor from Rutgers to Princeton, around which most of CNJ's biotech firms are clustered. The CNJ region, comprising Hunterdon, Mercer, Middlesex, Monmouth, and Somerset counties, has received $5 million, available under the Workforce Innovation in Regional Economic Development (WIRED) program from the United States Department of Labor (USDOL). The WIRED grant will be used to transform the rich array of existing bioscience education and training and economic development initiatives into a world class bioscience talent development system.

The partnership has its roots in an initiative created by Governor Jon Corzine as part of his statewide economic strategy. This is the third WIRED investment in New Jersey, making it “the most WIRED state” in the U.S.

== Goals ==
In collaboration with representatives of all key players in the biosciences in CNJ, the Bio-1 initiative will focus on six key strategies:

- Excite young people about the bio-sciences, especially focusing on underrepresented groups.
- Create a consortium of biotechnology educators from the high school through university levels that will facilitate smooth career pathways through articulation agreements, mentoring and professional development.
- Transform graduate education with the development of professional science master's degrees that integrate business and science, and interdisciplinary Ph.D. programs in biotech areas.
- Increase bioscience workforce development with education and training opportunities. A “flak jackets to lab coats” initiative, for example, will focus on training and job placement in the bioscience industry for returning veterans.
- Enhance linkages between education and industry through internships, cooperative education and mentoring.
- Facilitate globally competitive “biobusinesses” by encouraging collaboration between business and education, supporting bioscience start-ups and leveraging existing global networks.

== Partners ==
=== Industry groups ===
- BioNJ, Inc. (formerly Biotechnology Council of NJ, representing over 300 Member companies)
- HealthCare Institute of New Jersey (representing 34 pharmaceutical and medical device companies)

=== Individual companies ===
- Johnson & Johnson
- Celgene
- PTC Therapeutics
- Elusys Therapeutics
- Vicus
- Genmab
- Merck
- Sanofi-Aventis
- Bristol-Myers Squibb

=== Workforce Investment Boards ===
- Middlesex County WIB
- Monmouth County WIB
- Greater Raritan Valley WIB (Somerset and Hunterdon counties)
- Mercer County WIB

=== Colleges and universities ===
- Rutgers University
- Princeton University
- Monmouth University
- Rider University
- The College of New Jersey
- University of Medicine and Dentistry of New Jersey (UMDNJ)
- Robert Wood Johnson Medical School (RWJMS)
- Consortium of County Colleges including:
  - Raritan Valley Community College
  - Brookdale Community College
  - Middlesex County College
  - Mercer County Community College

=== Research institutes ===
- Cancer Institute of NJ
- Stem Cell Institute of New Jersey
- Center for Advanced Biotechnology and Medicine (CABM)
- Biotechnology Center for Agriculture and the Environment
- Waksman Institute of Microbiology

=== High schools ===
- Biotechnology High School (Monmouth County)
- Waksman Scholars – 20+ high schools
- Rider University partner high schools

=== Government and non-profit organizations ===
- New Jersey Economic Development Authority
- New Brunswick Innovation Zone
- Edison Venture Fund
- New Jersey Department of Labor and Workforce Development
- New Jersey Department of Education
- State Employment and Training Commission
- New Jersey Commission on Higher Education
- New Jersey Commission on Science and Technology
- Governor's Life Science Workforce Advisory Council
- The Biotechnology Institute
