= Boston Building =

- U.S. National Register of Historic Places
- Colorado State Register of Historic Properties
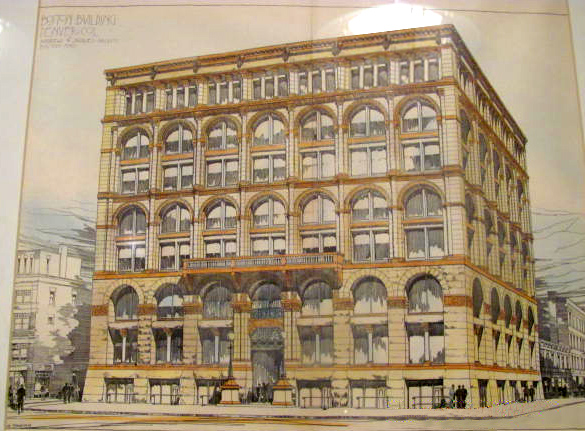

- Location within Colorado
- Location: 828 17th Street; Denver, Colorado 80202; United States
- Coordinates: 39°44′49″N 104°59′33″W
- Built: 1890
- Architect: Andrews, Jaques & Rantoul
- Architectural style: Renaissance Revival
- NRHP reference No.: 78000841
- CSRHP No.: 5DV.108
- Added to NRHP: September 18, 1978

The Boston Building, built in 1890, is a historic building in Denver, Colorado. It was designed by the firm Andrews, Jaques & Rantoul – the same architects who designed the nearby Equitable Building – and was dubbed the first "strictly modern office building" in Denver at time of its erection. Standing 9 stories or 35 m (115 ft), the building is located at 828 17th Street in Denver's historic district, on the corner of E. 17th St. and Champa. In 1978 the Boston Building received National Historic Landmark status under the Historic Resources of Downtown Denver Multiple Property Submission (Building Number: 5DV.108). The building has also been deemed a Denver historic landmark. In 1998, the building was renovated and joined with the Kistler Building to create one and two-bedroom apartment lofts. Together with the Bank Building across the street, is now also known as The Bank and Boston Lofts.

== Boston Lofts ==
Today, the Boston Building is located in the heart of downtown Denver next to LoDo and the 16th Street Mall. It is surrounded by other National Historic Landmark buildings, such as the US National/Guaranty Bank Building (which has been converted to the Bank Lofts), the American National Bank Building, and the Denver National Bank Building. It houses 158 residential apartment lofts, which have retained some of the character of the original building (including high ceilings, exposed brick, pressed-tin ceilings, and original stained glass windows on the 2nd floor). Its exterior features a combination of Renaissance Revival and Richardsonian Romanesque style elements and is clad in Manitou red sandstone. The original building had vaults in the corners of the building, which have been converted into vestibules for the corner apartment units. Some units have even retained the heavy vault doors on the outer vestibule. The property was purchased by Apartment Investment and Management Company (Aimco – stock ticker AIV) in 2000 from National Properties.

== Green Initiatives ==
Prior to 2008, the Boston Lofts purchased steam from Denver's central steam plant to provide domestic water heating and space heating. In 2008, the steam heating system was replaced with high efficiency, condensing boilers fueled by clean burning natural gas. The new system includes a web enabled building control system to maximize the operating efficiency of the new central plant. The retrofit conversion reduced the amount of energy required to fulfill the heating demands compared to the city steam system and also eliminated approximately 300,000 US gal (1,100,000 L; 250,000 imp gal) of wastewater per year.

== Tenants ==
In addition to the apartment lofts, the building also houses 9,600 square feet (890 m^{2}) of retail spaces - which is, as of March 2023, occupied by Cobbler's Corner, Tea Cloud and Poke, Native Barber Salon and FASTSIGNS.

== Gallery ==
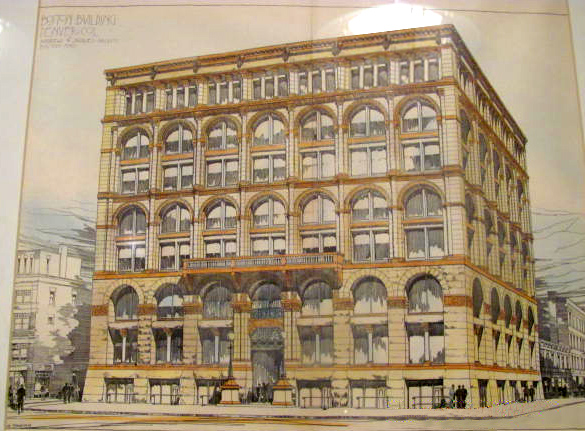
Architectural drawing of the historic Boston Building

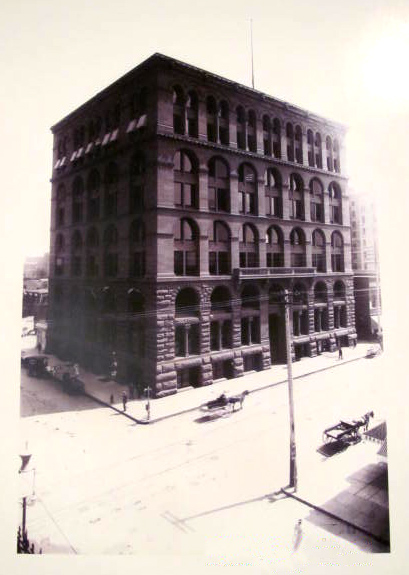
Bank Building in the early 1900s.

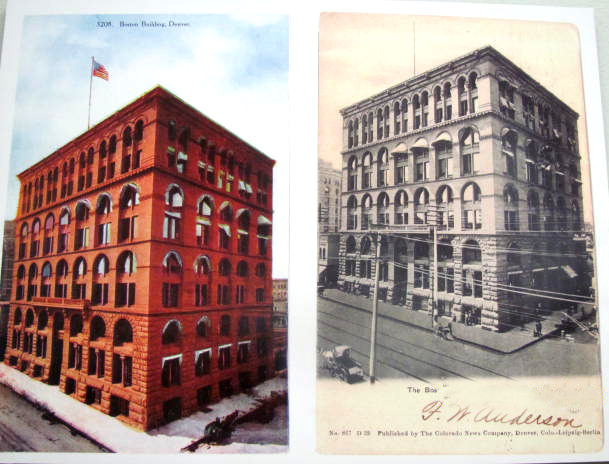
A comparison of the Bank Building at different times throughout the 1900s.

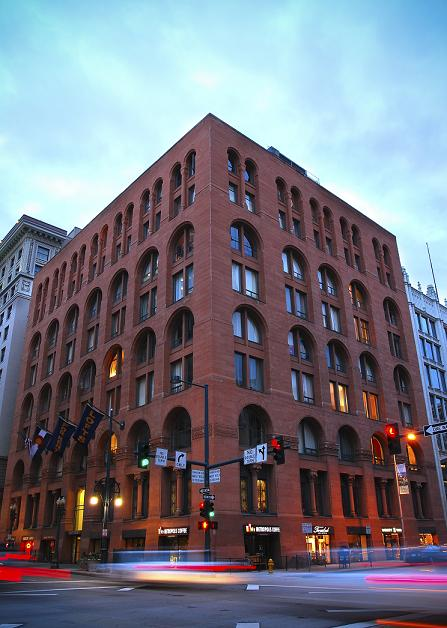
A night shot of the Boston building, which is located in the heart of downtown Denver.

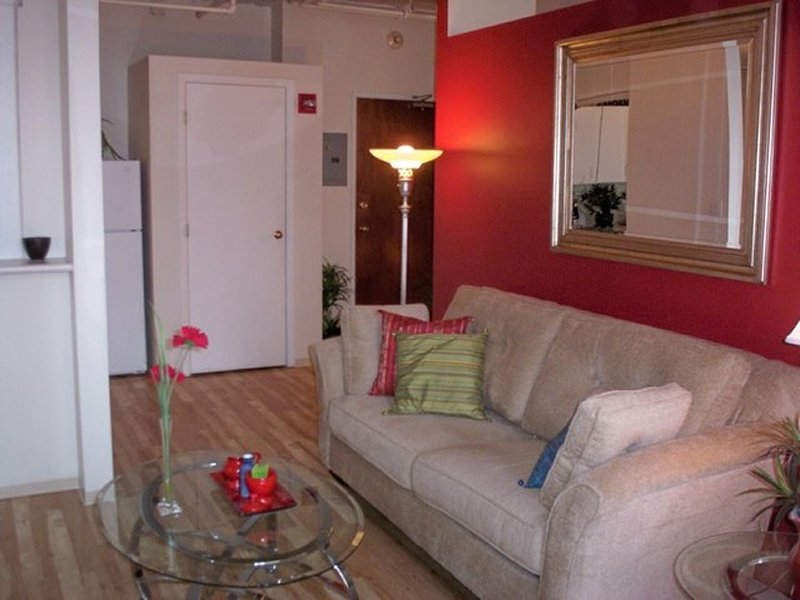
Converted loft in the Boston Building

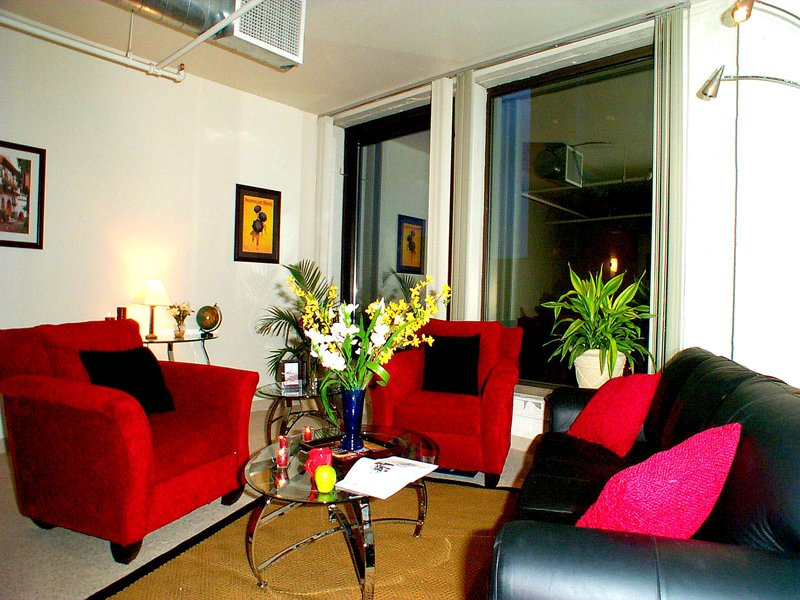
A living room in one of the Boston Building's converted lofts
