= Tower of Memories =

- U.S. National Register of Historic Places
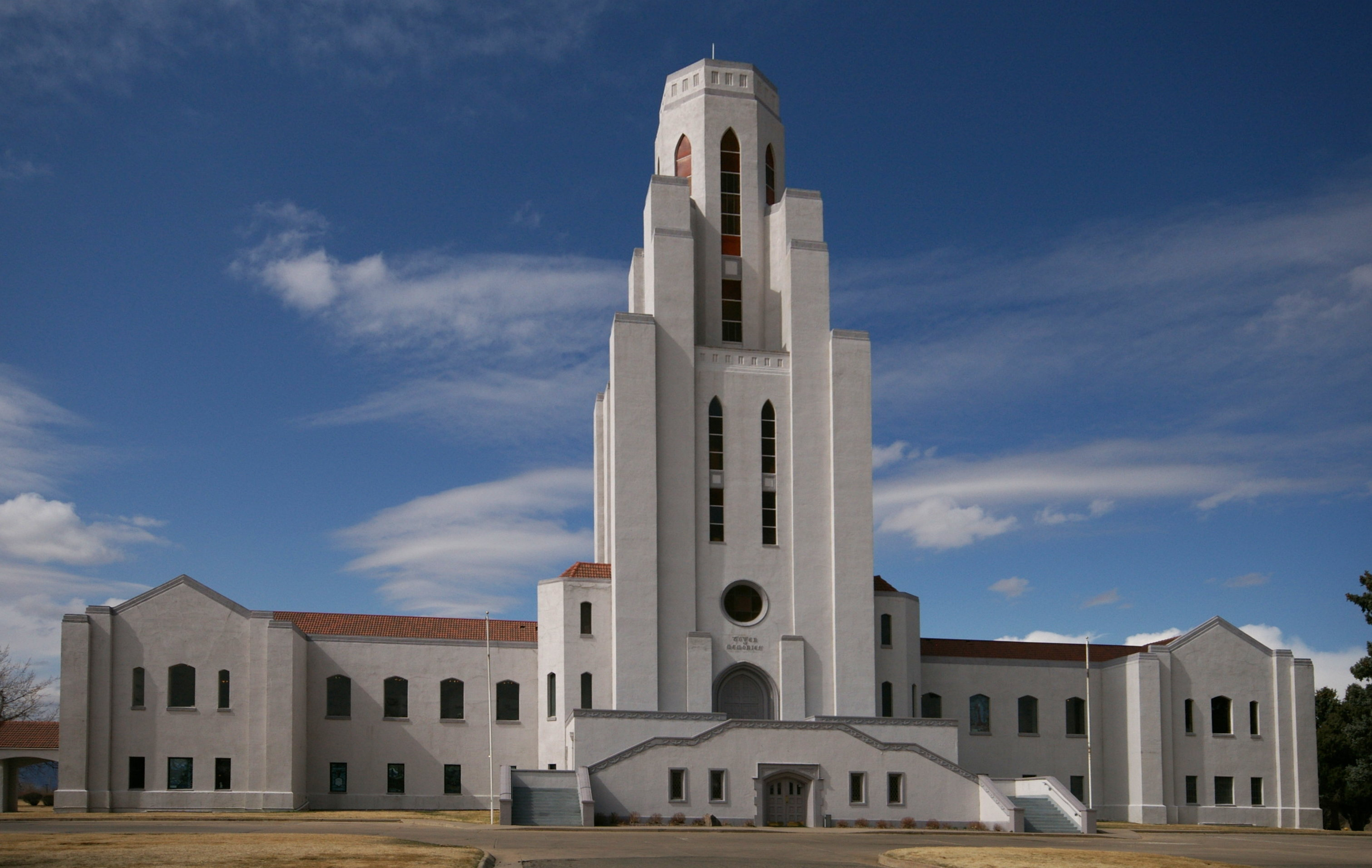

- Location within Colorado Location within the United States
- Location: 7777 W. 29th Avenue, Wheat Ridge, CO 80033
- Nearest city: Denver
- Coordinates: 39°45′29″N 105°05′41″W
- Area: 1.6 acres (0.65 ha)
- Built: late 1920s
- Architect: Charles A. Smith, Fisher & Fisher, John Monroe
- Architectural style: Moderne, Late Gothic Revival
- NRHP reference No.: 87001725
- Added to NRHP: September 25, 1987

The Tower of Memories is a mausoleum located at Crown Hill Cemetery in unincorporated Jefferson County, Colorado, US. The seven-story building is 158 feet (48.16 m) tall; its entrance is at 29th Avenue and Wadsworth Boulevard.

The building was designed with Gothic detailing by Charles A. Smith in 1926. After his firm failed in 1928, the architects William and Arthur Fisher were commissioned to continue the construction. World War II caused further delays to the building's construction. In 1948, the architect John Monroe was hired to complete the building.

== See also ==
- National Register of Historic Places listings in Jefferson County, Colorado
