= Sinclair, Wyoming =

- Town
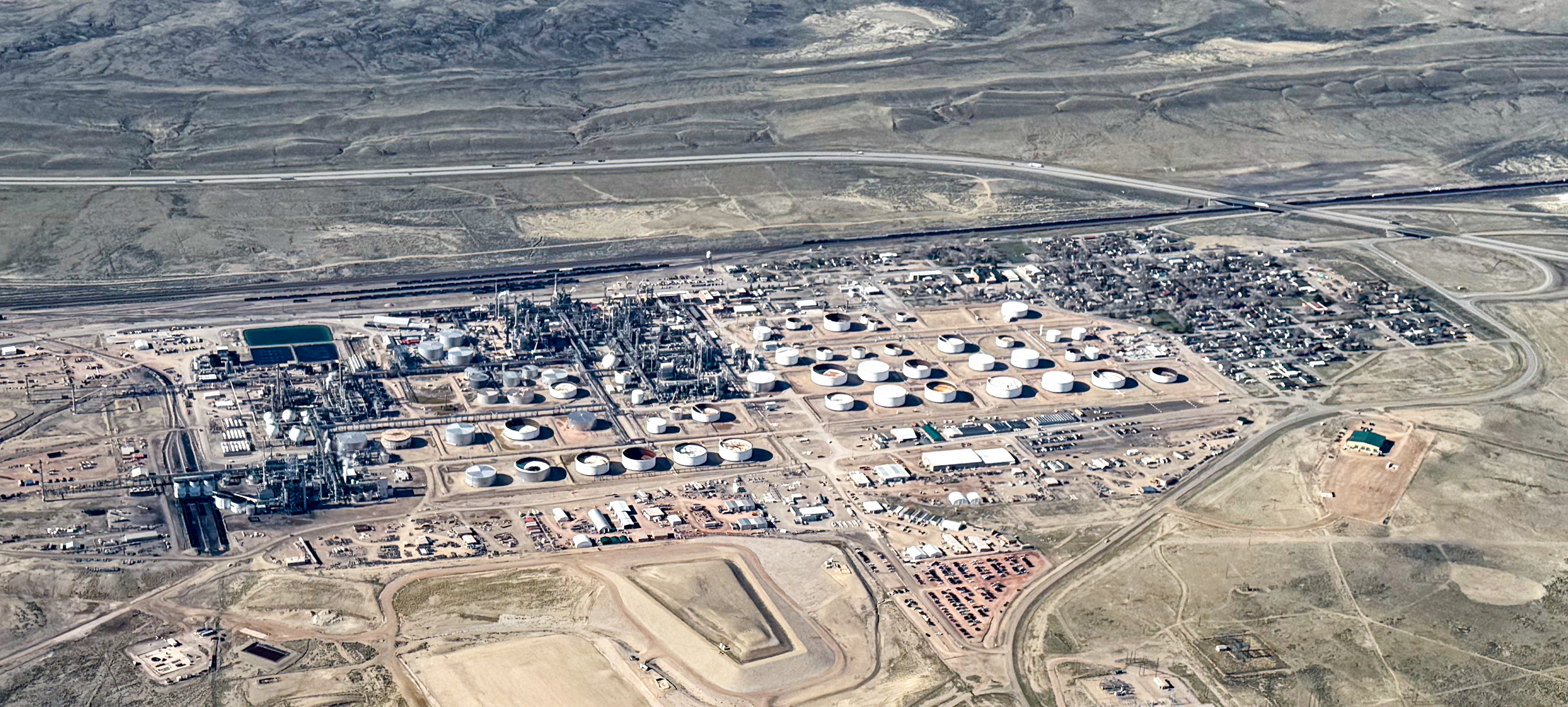
- View of the city and refinery of Sinclair, Wyoming

- Location of Sinclair in Carbon County, Wyoming.
- Coordinates: 41°46′32″N 107°07′26″W
- Country: United States
- State: Wyoming
- County: Carbon

Area
  - Total: 2.43 sq mi (6.30 km^{2})
  - Land: 2.43 sq mi (6.30 km^{2})
  - Water: 0 sq mi (0.00 km^{2})
- Elevation: 6,588 ft (2,008 m)

Population (2020)
  - Total: 374
  - Density: 162.5/sq mi (62.73/km^{2})
- Time zone: UTC-7 (Mountain (MST))
  - Summer (DST): UTC-6 (MDT)
- ZIP code: 82334
- Area code: 307
- FIPS code: 56-71150
- GNIS feature ID: 2413291
- Website: www.sinclairwyoming.com

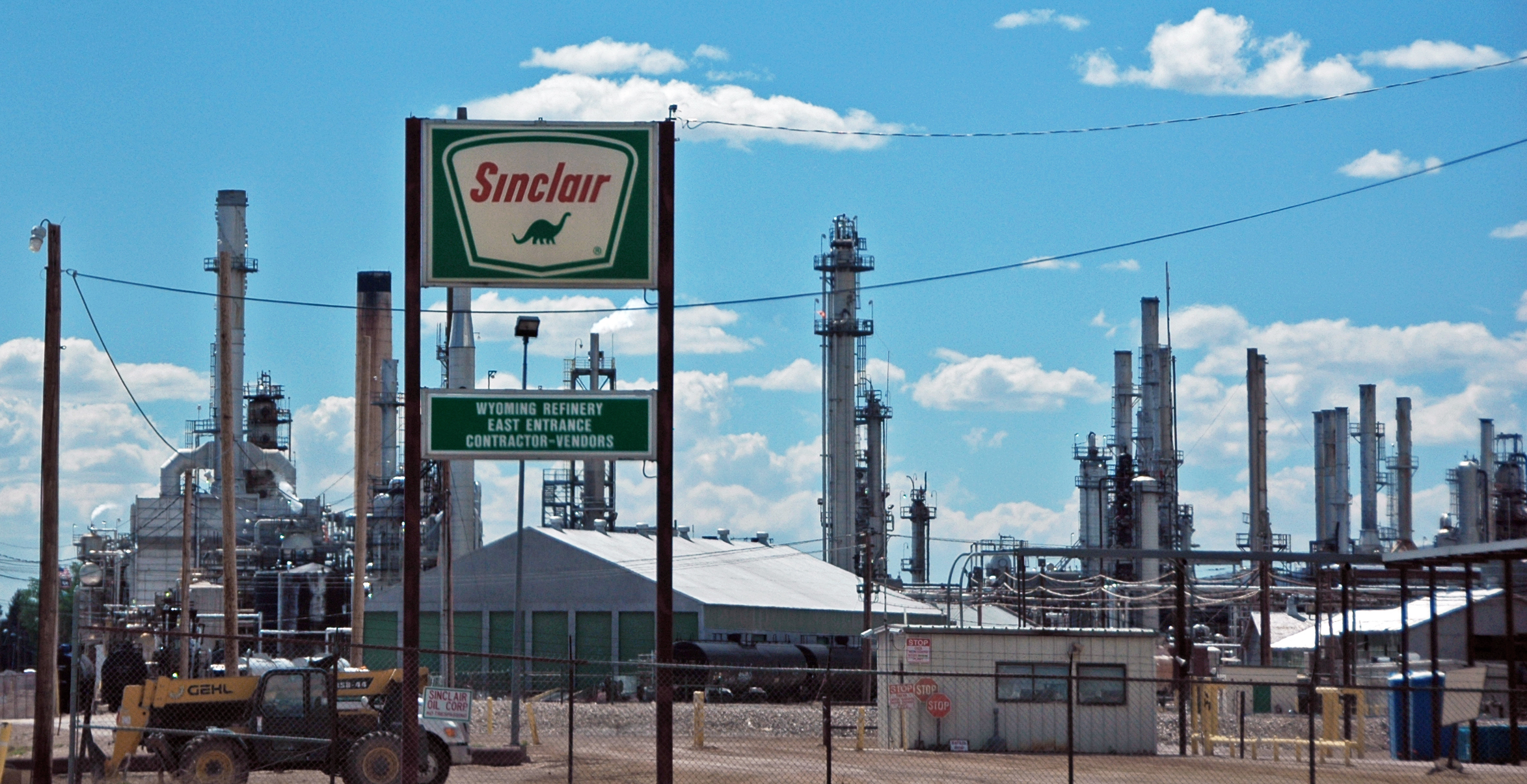
Sinclair Refinery in 2011

Sinclair is a town in Carbon County, Wyoming, United States. As of the 2020 census, Sinclair had a population of 374.

== History ==
The town was originally called Parco, after the Producers & Refiners Corporation (or PARCO), which founded the refinery and the company town. It was renamed Sinclair after PARCO was acquired during the Great Depression by Sinclair Consolidated Oil Corporation. The original refinery, located just east of town, remains in use to this day. Sinclair's population was 433 at the 2010 census.

The town was built as a planned community in 1924–1925, designed by Denver architects Fisher & Fisher in a Spanish Colonial Revival style. The historic center of town was designated the Parco Historic District in 1987.

Just six miles east of Sinclair is the ghost town site of Benton, Wyoming at milepost 672.1 of the Union Pacific Railroad. As the terminal of the railroad at the time, Benton had a colorful three-month history which ended in September 1868 with a visit from Republican presidential candidate Ulysses S. Grant and the departure of the final overland wagon trains on the Mormon Trail headed for the Salt Lake Valley before completion of the railroad the following year.

Three miles east of the Benton site is Fort Fred Steele State Historic Site. The original Ft. Steele was named for American Civil War Union General Frederick Steele and established June 20, 1868, to protect the Union Pacific Railway as it rapidly expanded west. The fort was deactivated August 7, 1886, and most of the buildings at the fort were sold and moved to the settlement which had grown up around the fort and other locations. The small community continued until 1939 when the Lincoln Highway was paved and rerouted to coincide with what later became Interstate 80. In 1940, following the short-lived Supreme Court decision Minersville School District v. Gobitis, residents tarred and feathered the town's Jehovah's Witnesses. The Wyoming State Legislature preserved what remained in 1973 with creation of the state historical site.

== Geography ==
According to the United States Census Bureau, the town has a total area of 2.43 square miles (6.29 km^{2}), all land.

== Demographics ==
Historical population
| Census | Pop. | Note | %± |
|---|---|---|---|
| 1930 | 727 | | — |
| 1940 | 604 | | −16.9% |
| 1950 | 775 | | 28.3% |
| 1960 | 621 | | −19.9% |
| 1970 | 445 | | −28.3% |
| 1980 | 586 | | 31.7% |
| 1990 | 500 | | −14.7% |
| 2000 | 423 | | −15.4% |
| 2010 | 433 | | 2.4% |
| 2020 | 374 | | −13.6% |
| 2025 (est.) | 360 | ▼ | −3.7% |
U.S. Decennial Census

=== 2010 census ===
As of the census of 2010, there were 433 people, 170 households, and 123 families living in the town. The population density was 178.2 inhabitants per square mile (68.8/km^{2}). There were 198 housing units at an average density of 81.5 per square mile (31.5/km^{2}). The racial makeup of the town was 94.2% White, 0.7% Native American, 0.5% Asian, 2.1% from other races, and 2.5% from two or more races. Hispanic or Latino of any race were 6.5% of the population.

There were 170 households, of which 32.4% had children under the age of 18 living with them, 64.7% were married couples living together, 3.5% had a female householder with no husband present, 4.1% had a male householder with no wife present, and 27.6% were non-families. 23.5% of all households were made up of individuals, and 7% had someone living alone who was 65 years of age or older. The average household size was 2.52 and the average family size was 2.95.

The median age in the town was 39.5 years. 24.9% of residents were under the age of 18; 7% were between the ages of 18 and 24; 25.6% were from 25 to 44; 29.9% were from 45 to 64; and 12.5% were 65 years of age or older. The gender makeup of the town was 52.2% male and 47.8% female.

=== 2000 census ===
As of the census of 2000, there were 424 people, 168 households, and 115 families living in the town. The population density was 174.0 people per square mile (67.2/km^{2}). There were 211 housing units at an average density of 86.8 per square mile (33.5/km^{2}). The racial makeup of the town was 96.22% White, 0.47% African American, 1.42% Native American, 0.95% from other races, and 0.95% from two or more races. Hispanic or Latino of any race were 2.60% of the population.

There were 168 households, out of which 34.5% had children under the age of 18 living with them, 56.0% were married couples living together, 7.7% had a female householder with no husband present, and 31.0% were non-families. 27.4% of all households were made up of individuals, and 13.7% had someone living alone who was 65 years of age or older. The average household size was 2.52 and the average family size was 3.02.

In the town, the population was spread out, with 27.2% under the age of 18, 6.1% from 18 to 24, 26.0% from 25 to 44, 27.9% from 45 to 64, and 12.8% who were 65 years of age or older. The median age was 41 years. For every 100 females, there were 97.7 males. For every 100 females age 18 and over, there were 102.6 males.

The median income for a household in the town was $48,214, and the median income for a family was $54,688. Males had a median income of $36,875 versus $26,250 for females. The per capita income for the town was $22,384. About 1.7% of families and 4.7% of the population were below the poverty line, including 6.1% of those under age 18 and none of those age 65 or over.

== Education ==
Public education in the town of Sinclair is provided by Carbon County School District #1. Zoned campuses include Rawlins Elementary School (grades K–5), Rawlins Middle School (grades 6–8), and Rawlins High School (grades 9–12).

Sinclair has a public library, a branch of the Carbon County Library System.

== See also ==
- List of oil pipelines
- List of oil refineries
