= Workforce Innovation in Regional Economic Development =

Workforce Innovation in Regional Economic Development (WIRED)
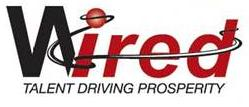

Department overview
- Formed: February 1, 2006
- Preceding Department: Department of Labor
- Headquarters: Francis Perkins Building; Washington DC
- Website: www.doleta.gov/wired

Workforce Innovation in Regional Economic Development (WIRED) was a project of the United States Department of Labor. It provided a new approach to workforce and economic development. Through the WIRED model, regions integrated economic and workforce development activities to demonstrate that talent development can drive economic transformation in regional economies across the United States.

== History ==
=== Birth of the Public Workforce System ===
The WIRED Initiative was conceived from lessons learned since the birth of the public workforce system in the 1930s. The workforce system was designed for the economy of the day - an economy characterized by interchangeable labor, cyclical layoffs and a workforce that required no more than a high school diploma. These New Deal policies firmly established the federal government's commitment to minimizing hardships associated with unemployment and facilitating a worker's return to work.

In the 1960s, a job training system was created to serve American workers. Like other programs of the day, the system was designed on a social services model. Policies like the Manpower Development and Training Act (MDTA) of 1962 and the Comprehensive Employment and Training Act (CETA) of 1973 had little private sector involvement and governed a system that saw over 40 percent of its participants engaged in subsidized employment.

In 1982, the Job Training Partnership Act (JTPA) was enacted, replacing CETA. JTPA eliminated the Public Service Employment Program (part of CETA) and increased funding for job training.

=== WIA ===
The Workforce Investment Act of 1998 (WIA) reformed the structure established by the JTPA. The act, which was approved with strong bipartisan support, streamlined service delivery through One-Stop Career Centers, strengthened performance accountability, promoted universal access to services, created business-led state and local boards and promoted individual choice.

=== High Growth Job Training Initiative ===
To address the growing need for skilled workers, DOL identified industries of our economy that could significantly benefit from talent development; industries that are experiencing rapid growth or a significant transformation in the skills required of its employees. Launched in 2003, the President's High Growth Job Training Initiative engages these identified industries in the talent development, connects businesses to the workforce system and creates programs designed to meet their specific workforce needs. The initiative takes a groundbreaking approach to closing skills gaps by developing solutions to workforce challenges and creating partnerships among business, education institutions and the workforce community.

=== Community-Based Job Training Grants ===
The President's Community-Based Job Training Grants address the need for a partnership between the workforce system and the vocational education system, increase the capacity of community colleges to meet the demands of today's employers and recognize community colleges as an easily adaptable and viable means for talent development. The grants provide schools the resources to hire faculty, and purchase equipment and facilities they needed to train and educate workers for jobs in the high-growth fields. These grants were first made available in 2005, and are designed to bridge community colleges with business and industry to better address talent development. Additionally, Community-Based Job Training Grants also help strengthen the relationship between the job training system and the community college system.

The jobs of today and tomorrow require individuals with postsecondary education and community colleges are the most flexible, affordable and accessible option for many Americans. As more competition enters the global market, workers from around the globe are competing with Americans for jobs and winning. The Community Based Job Training Grants empower community colleges to provide greater opportunities for Americans and keeps our nation competitive in the global economy.

=== Regional Economies ===
Globalization has changed the formula for developing a prepared workforce and necessitated a change in visualizing the boundaries of an economy. An economy is no longer defined by the political boundaries of a city, county or state line. Instead, economies are defined regionally by a diverse group of industries, supported by factors such as infrastructure, investment and an availability of local talent. This regional concept promotes partnerships among key community players, including K-12 schools, community colleges, adult education centers, universities, regional employers and community economic and workforce development organizations. This is supported by academic developments, as scholars like Porter (2000) argue for the continuing importance of industry clusters for economic development at both the macro and micro level.

=== The Birth of WIRED ===
On February 1, 2006, U.S. Department of Labor Secretary Elaine L. Chao announced the WIRED Initiative, encompassing these ideals to better align workforce and economic development. WIRED takes a critical step in providing individuals with the tools for success, businesses the human capital required for growth, and the American economy the fuel for continued strength.

== Activities ==
In February 2006, following a Solicitation for Grant Applications, the Employment & Training Administration (ETA) announced 13 regions that comprise the WIRED 1st Generation. These regions were selected on the basis of a number of criteria, including (1) the viability of regionally competitive clusters; (2) a framework for public-private administration of the program; (3) evidence of economic distress in the region; and (4) a detailed plan for systematic interconnections between public workforce administration agencies, educational institutions, nonprofits, and private industry. First Generation regions face various challenges in economic development and sustainability including: remaining competitive with a globalized workforce; managing existing growth opportunities; and creating a more innovative economy by focusing on developing small business. First Generation WIRED Regions were awarded $15 million over three years to revitalize their local economy.

In April, 2006, ETA added 13 additional regions, then known as the Virtual Regions. These regions received a $100,000 planning grant, were invited to participate in all WIRED-related activities and were given access to the tools and resources developed. In January 2007, these regions became the 2nd Generation Regions and received an immediate investment of $500,000. This investment supports the development of a comprehensive implementation plan. Upon completion and acceptance of this plan, each region will receive an additional $4.5 million investment over a three-year period.

On June 20, 2007, ETA announced the expansion of the WIRED Initiative. Thirteen applications were selected to become the Third Generation of WIRED Regions. Each will receive a $5 million investment over a three-year period.

All 39 WIRED Regions were supported by managers from ETA and the WIRED resource team, as well as access to various staff from other federal agencies. This expanded team provided the regions with tools and technical assistance that assisted them with implementing their plan for regional economic growth.

In addition to the monetary investments, a number of activities took place in support of the WIRED regions including:

- Creation of a data tool that incorporates economic, research and development, investment and real-time job information to provide a current and accurate picture of the regional economy and its assets.
- Development of a nationwide network of foundations interested in investing in regional economic and talent development.
- Linkages to angel and venture capital networks.
- Connections to programs and investments at nine other federal agencies for regions to access and apply in support of their economic strategy.
- Partnerships with state universities and land grant colleges as well as university continuing education departments.

== Critical reception ==
Recent academic literature seems to reinforce WIRED's rationale. Indeed, there are two economic development forces—which often theoretically overlap—at work here: one at the micro level (the specific programs of the grantee regions) and one at the macro level (the federal government). At the grantee level, as Renski (2009) notes, “there are really no new ideas in WIRED. Clusters, partnerships, regional competitiveness, asset mapping—the buzzwords of WIRED—have been a part of the vernacular of the economic development profession for quite some time." In this respect, the WIRED initiative as a whole incorporates a number of well-accepted economic development practices, while leaving specific application to each grantee region. Blakeley and Leigh (2010), Porter (2000), and Renski note that cities and regions have long practiced economic development techniques like fostering cluster development to stimulate innovation and technology spillover to remain competitive in a global market.

Yet, at the macro level, subsidizing this approach regionally is new. Renski points out that “the novel aspect of WIRED is simply that it is administered and funded by the U.S. federal government, who has had little involvement in regional economic development since the 1970s.” Markusen and Glassmeier (2008) note that “In general, federal economic development programs place too much emphasis on physical infrastructure and not enough on human capital and ‘soft’ infrastructure, meaning organizational know-how and networking.” Thus, it is the focus on regional growth that crosses traditional political and jurisdictional boundaries which makes WIRED a notable program in the conversation on effective economic development policy.

== WIRED Regions ==
A partial list of locations, with their respective programs is provided below:

=== First Generation ===
- Coastal Maine, North Star Alliance Alliance Initiative
- Northeast Pennsylvania, Wall Street West
- Upstate New York, Finger Lakes Wired
- Piedmont Triad North Carolina, Piedmont Triad
- Mid-Michigan, Mid-Michigan Innovation Team
- West Michigan, West Michigan Strategic Alliance
- North Central Indiana, Indiana-Wired
- Florida's Great Northwest, WIRED Northwest Florida Initiative
- Western Alabama & Eastern Mississippi, WAEM
- Greater Kansas City
- Denver Region, Metro Denver WIRED
- Central & Eastern Montana, Montana-WIRED
- California, California Innovation Corridor

=== Second Generation ===
- Central-Eastern Puerto Rico
- Southwestern Connecticut, Workplace, Inc
- Northern New Jersey, Newark Alliance
- Delaware Valley, Delaware Valley Innovation Network
- Appalachian Ohio, Information Technology Alliance
- Southeast Michigan
- Tennessee Valley
- Southwest Indiana, SI-Wired
- Southeastern Wisconsin
- Arkansas Delta
- Rio South Texas Region
- Wasatch Range
- Northern California

=== Third Generation ===
- Southern Arizona
- South-Central Idaho
- South-Central Kansas
- Central Kentucky
- Southeastern Mississippi
- Southeast Missouri
- Minnesota Triangle
- Central New Jersey, Bio-1
- Greater Albuquerque, New Mexico
- North Oregon
- Southeastern Virginia
- Pacific Mountain Washington
- South Central Wisconsin & South West Wisconsin

== Partners ==
The ETA and WIRED are currently working with a number of agencies:

- U.S Department of Agriculture (USDA) Rural Development Agency
- U.S. Department of Transportation (DOT)
- U.S. Department of Commerce (DOC)
  - Economic Development Administration (EDA)
  - National Institute of Standards and Technology (NIST)
- U.S. Department of Education (ED)
- U.S. Department of Energy (DOE)
- National Science Foundation (NSF)
- U.S. Department of Defense (DoD)
