= Parco Historic District =

Historic district in Wyoming, United States

- U.S. National Register of Historic Places
- U.S. Historic district
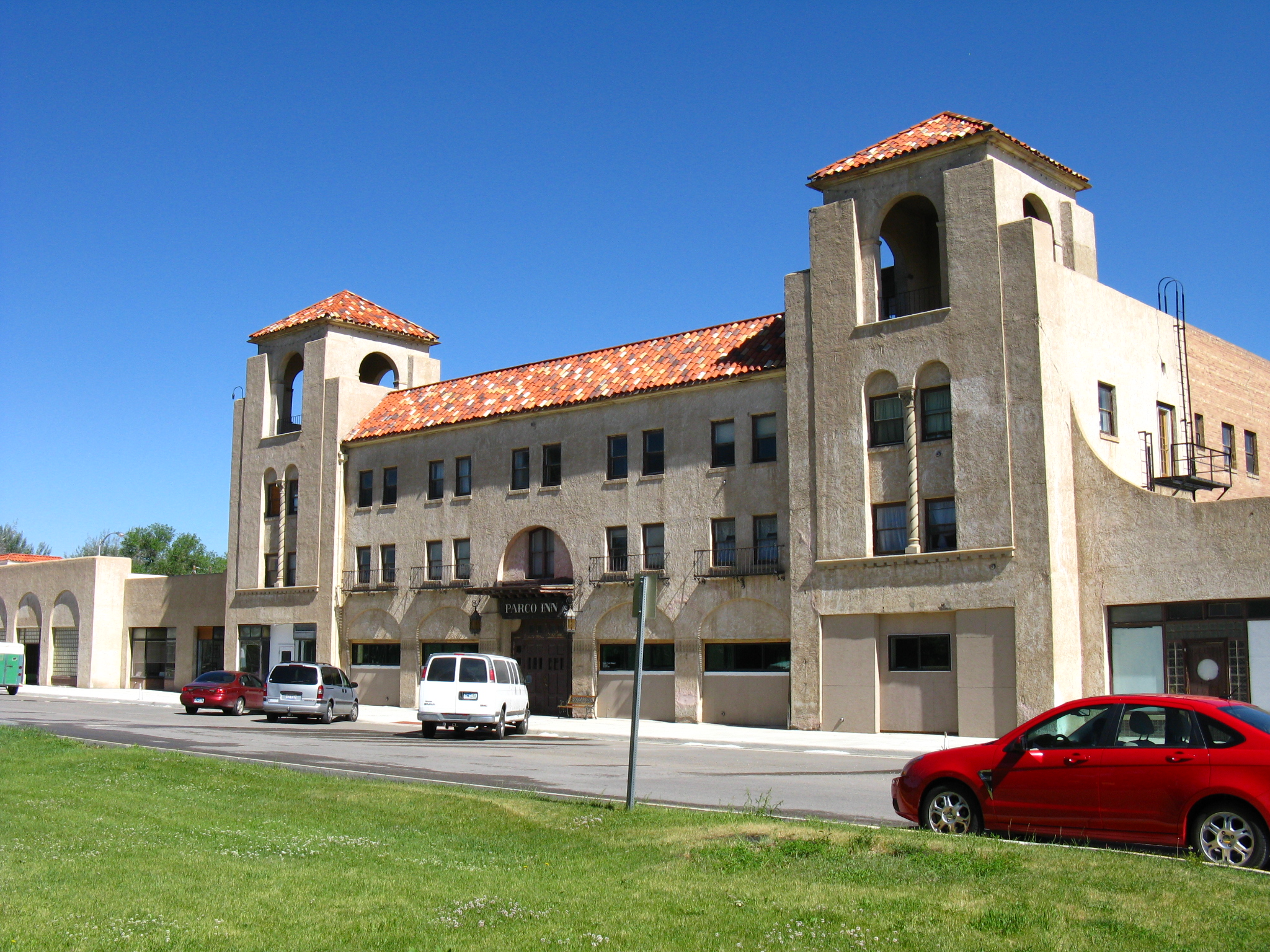
- The Parco Inn in 2008

- Location within Wyoming
- Location: Roughly bounded by Monroe Ave., N. Fourth St., Union and Lincoln Aves., and N. Ninth St., Sinclair, Wyoming
- Coordinates: 41°46′47″N 107°07′04″W
- Area: 31 acres (13 ha)
- Built: 1924
- Architect: Fisher & Fisher
- NRHP reference No.: 87000918
- Added to NRHP: May 6, 1987

The Parco Historic District, also known as the Sinclair Historic District, comprises the center of Sinclair, Wyoming, originally known as Parco, surrounding the Parco Inn. The district includes 93 buildings, of which 49 are considered to be contributing structures to the district. Sinclair was built as a company town in 1924–25 with a consistent design theme by architects Fisher & Fisher in the Spanish Colonial revival style. In addition to the Parco Inn other significant structures include the Sinclair Theatre and Recreation Hall, the school, the library and the Community Church. The central plaza, business district and original worker housing also contribute.

Parco was built as a company town to house workers at the Producers and Refiners Oil Company (PARCO) refinery for oil man Frank Kistler. The town was renamed Sinclair in 1942 when the town and refinery were managed by the Sinclair Refining Company.

The Parco Historic District was placed on the National Register of Historic Places on May 6, 1987.
