= Fisher & Fisher =

Architectural firm based in Denver, Colorado

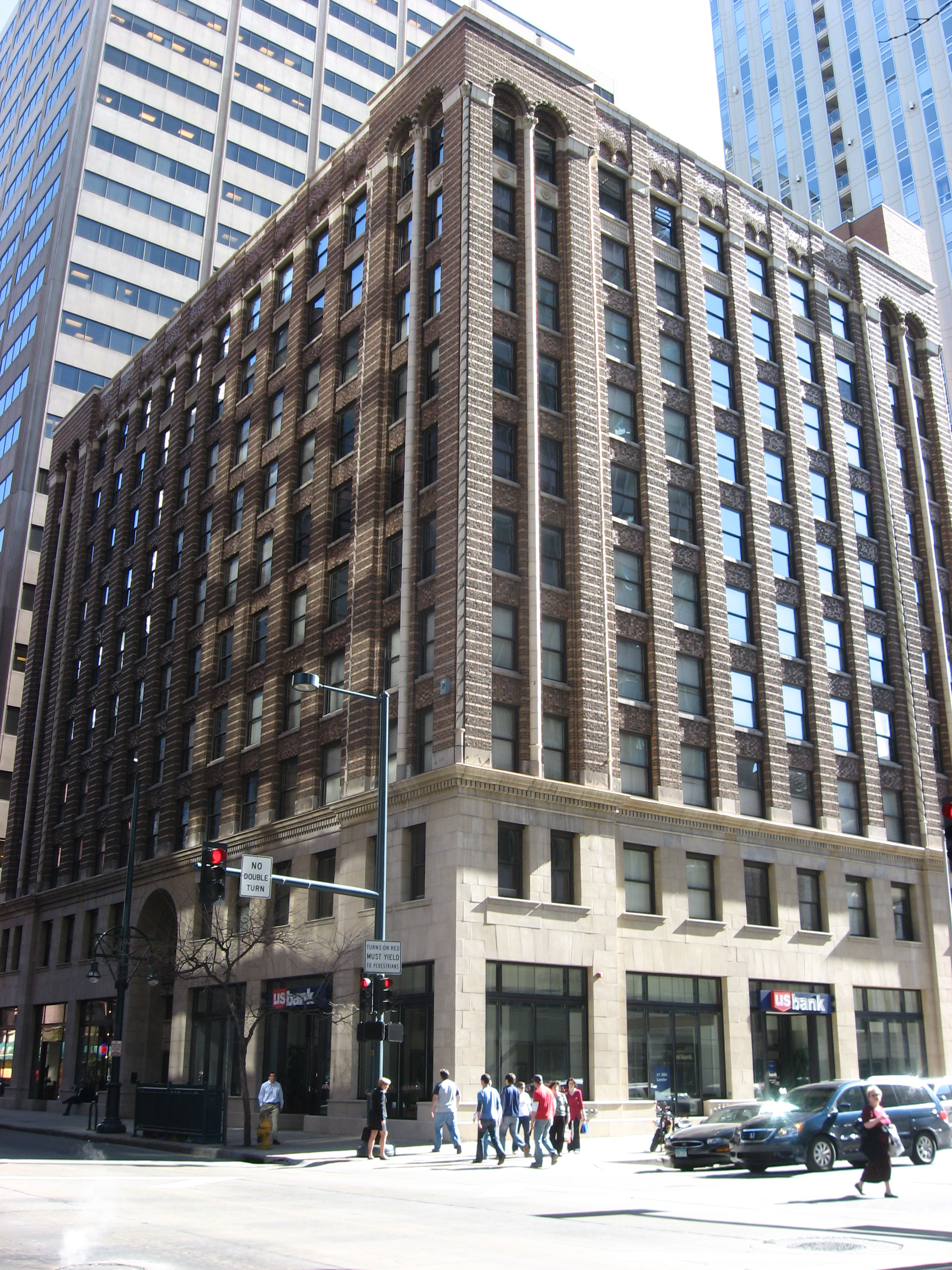
Midland Savings Building, downtown Denver (Fisher & Fisher, 1926)

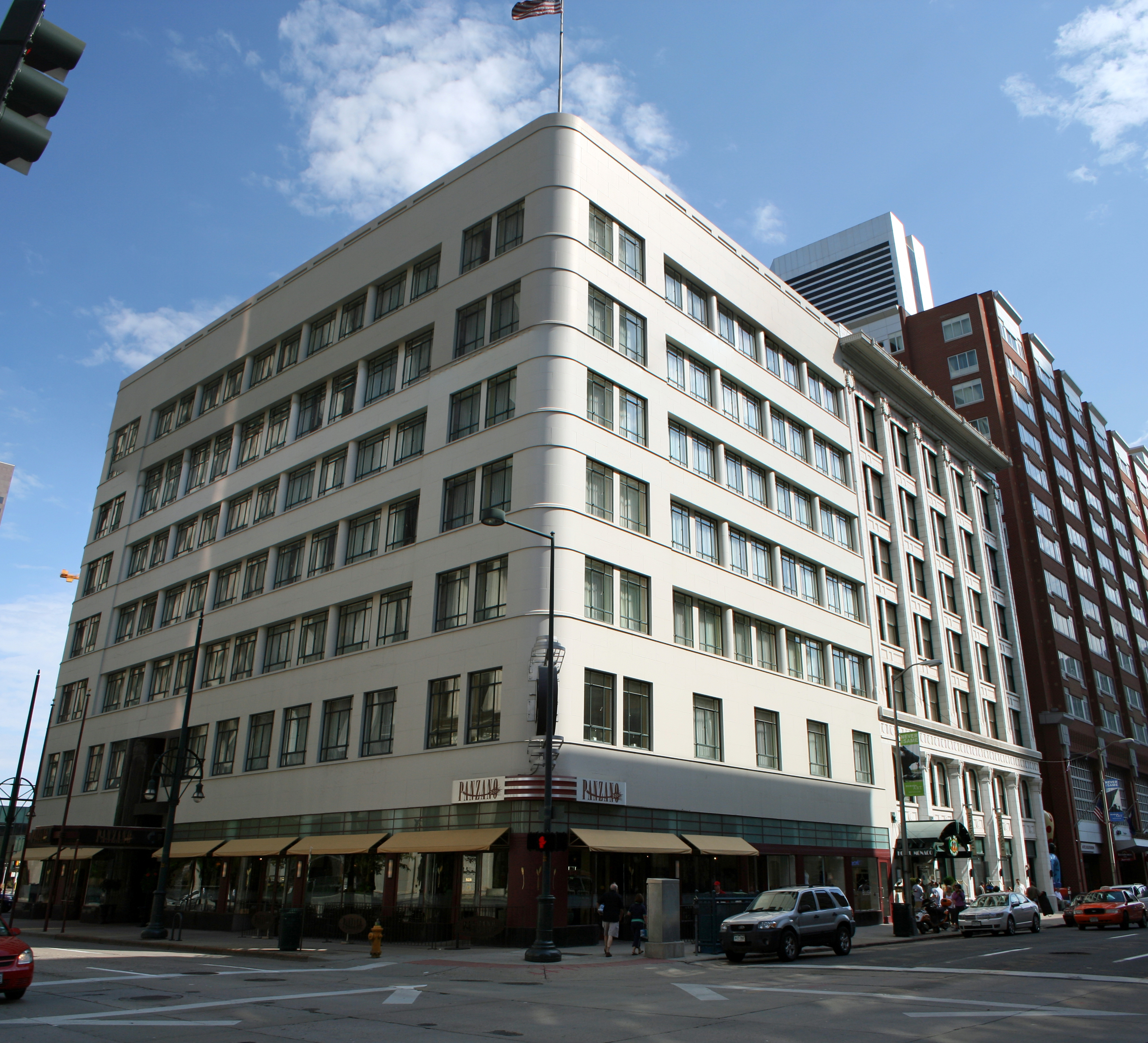
Railway Exchange New Building, downtown Denver (Fisher, Fisher & Howell, 1937) and adjoining Railway Exchange Extension (Fisher & Fisher, 1909/13)

Fisher & Fisher was an architectural firm based in Denver, Colorado named for partners William Ellsworth Fisher (1871–1937) and Arthur Addison Fisher (1878–1965).

The firm was founded in 1892 by William Ellsworth Fisher as William Fisher, Architect. After ten years in practice alone, mainly designing starter homes, he partnered with Daniel Riggs Huntington from 1901 to 1905 as Fisher & Huntington, during which time the firm designed increasingly expensive residences and also commercial buildings. The firm then once more became William Fisher, Architect until 1907, when William was joined by his younger brother Arthur Addison Fisher; they worked together as William Fisher Architect and Brother until 1910 and then as William E. Fisher and Arthur A. Fisher, Architects until William's death in 1937. William's son Alan B. Fisher, who had previously joined the firm, then became his uncle's partner and the firm was renamed Arthur A. Fisher and Alan B. Fisher, Architects. From 1956 to 1959 they were joined by Rodney S. Davis as Fisher, Fisher and Davis; on Arthur's retirement the firm became Fisher and Davis. Finally beginning in 1967, Alan Fisher was in partnership with John D. Reece and Hilary M. Johnson as Fisher, Reece and Johnson until his retirement in 1978.

In Colorado, the firm worked on dozens of notable buildings, and has left a legacy unique in the state. Of 67 surviving buildings in Denver identifiable as being by Fisher & Fisher, 50 are either listed on the U.S. National Register of Historic Places (NRHP), individually or as part of historic districts, or are eligible for listing. Although most work by Fisher & Fisher was in Denver, buildings by them elsewhere in the state and outside it are also listed. For example, William and Arthur Fisher planned the town of Parco, Wyoming (now Sinclair) and designed its public buildings.

The Fisher brothers were unusually innovative, and the firm's buildings are in a variety of styles. The Railway Exchange Addition of 1909/13 and the connected Railway Exchange New Building of 1937 (now the Hotel Monaco) in downtown Denver show contrasting styles by the same firm. The New Building, by Fisher, Fisher & Hubbell, is one of Denver's best Art Moderne works, although the architects denied at the time that it was "modernistic".

In April 2011 one of their works, the Cowperthwaite home, was the 2011 Denver Designer Show House, a fundraiser involving interior decorators prior to the house coming to market.

Among lost works by the firm are the Lafayette Hughes and Gerald Hughes mansions.

Surviving works include (with attribution):

- Ashland Public Library, 207 N. 15th St. Ashland, NE (Shankland, W.R./Fisher & Fisher), NRHP-listed
- Belcaro, 3400 Belcaro Dr. Denver, CO (Fisher & Fisher), NRHP-listed
- Copperthwaite Home
- Ideal Building, 821 17th St. Denver, CO (Fisher & Fisher), NRHP-listed
- Lorraine Lodge, SW of Golden Golden, CO (Fisher & Fisher), NRHP-listed
- McPhee and McGinnity Building, 2301 Blake St. Denver, CO (Fisher & Fisher), NRHP-listed
- Neusteter Building, 720 Sixteenth St. Denver, CO (Fisher & Fisher), NRHP-listed
- South High School, 17800 East Louisiana Avenue Denver, CO (Fisher & Fisher), NRHP-listed
- St. Thomas Episcopal Church, 607 Fourth St. Alamosa, CO (Fisher, William Ellsworth; Fisher, Arthur Addison), NRHP-listed
- Tower of Memories, 8500 W. 29th Ave. Wheat Ridge, CO (Charles A. Smith, Fisher & Fisher, John Monroe), NRHP-listed
- Tramway Building, 1100 14th St. Denver, CO (Fisher & Fisher), NRHP-listed
- Quine Commercial Building (apartments, theater and retail), 6 Broadway Denver, CO (Fisher & Fisher)
- Original public buildings in Parco Historic District, roughly bounded by Monroe Ave., N. Fourth St., Union and Lincoln Aves., and N. Ninth St. Sinclair, WY (Fisher & Fisher), NRHP-listed
