= National Register of Historic Places listings in Arapahoe County, Colorado =

Location of Arapahoe County in Colorado

This is a list of the National Register of Historic Places listings in Arapahoe County, Colorado.

This is intended to be a complete list of the properties and districts on the National Register of Historic Places in Arapahoe County, Colorado, United States. The locations of National Register properties and districts for which the latitude and longitude coordinates are included below, may be seen in a map.

There are 26 properties and districts listed on the National Register in the county.

This National Park Service list is complete through NPS recent listings posted September 25, 2026.

== Current listings ==
	Name on the Register	Image	Date listed	Location	City or town	Description
1	Arapahoe Acres	Arapahoe Acres	November 3, 1998 (#98001249)	Roughly bounded by W. Bates and Dartmouth Aves. and S. Marion and Franklin Sts. 39°39′44″N 104°58′13″W	Englewood	
2	Arapaho Hills	Arapaho Hills	August 28, 2012 (#12000550)	Bounded by Arrowhead, W. Berry, & S. Manitou Rds., S. Lowell Blvd. 39°37′07″N 105°02′12″W	Littleton	part of the Residential Subdivisions of Metropolitan Denver, 1940-1965 Multiple Property Submission (MPS)
3	David W. Brown House	David W. Brown House	April 10, 1980 (#80000875)	2303 E. Dartmouth Ave. 39°39′38″N 104°57′38″W	Englewood	
4	Comanche Crossing of the Kansas Pacific Railroad	Comanche Crossing of the Kansas Pacific Railroad	August 10, 1970 (#70000152)	On Union Pacific Railroad tracks east of the Strasburg depot 39°44′15″N 104°18′29″W	Strasburg	
5	Commandant of Cadets Building, US Air Force Academy	Commandant of Cadets Building, US Air Force Academy	April 24, 2007 (#07000340)	1016 Boston St. 39°43′48″N 104°52′41″W	Aurora	
6	Curtis School	Curtis School	June 25, 1992 (#92000808)	2349 E. Orchard Rd. 39°36′37″N 104°57′37″W	Greenwood Village	part of the Rural School Buildings in Colorado MPS
7	DeLaney Barn	DeLaney Barn	February 9, 1989 (#89000010)	200 S. Chambers Rd. 39°42′48″N 104°48′27″W	Aurora	
8	Englewood I.O.O.F. Lodge No. 138 Building	Englewood I.O.O.F. Lodge No. 138 Building	July 12, 2021 (#100006716)	3421, 3425 and 3427 South Broadway; 39°39′17″N 104°59′16″W	Englewood	
9	Englewood Post Office	Englewood Post Office	July 20, 2011 (#11000465)	3332 S. Broadway; 39°39′22″N 104°59′14″W	Englewood	
10	Foster-Buell Estate		April 1, 1998 (#98000294)	2700 E. Hampden Ave. 39°38′50″N 104°57′01″W	Cherry Hills Village	
11	Geneva Home	Geneva Home	January 21, 1999 (#98001635)	2305 W. Berry Ave. 39°37′04″N 105°00′53″W	Littleton	
12	Gully Homestead	Gully Homestead	January 9, 1986 (#86000022)	200 S. Chambers Rd. 39°42′44″N 104°48′32″W	Aurora	
13	Hopkins Farm	Hopkins Farm	April 24, 2007 (#07000341)	4400 E. Quincy Ave. 39°38′15″N 104°56′17″W	Cherry Hills Village	
14	Jamaica Primary School	Jamaica Primary School	May 1, 2017 (#100000928)	800 Jamaica St. 39°43′45″N 104°51′47″W	Aurora	
15	Key Savings and Loan Association Building	Key Savings and Loan Association Building	July 18, 2016 (#16000447)	3501 S. Broadway; 39°39′11″N 104°59′16″W	Englewood	
16	Knight-Wood House	Knight-Wood House	October 6, 2004 (#04001111)	1860 W. Littleton Boulevard; 39°36′47″N 105°00′34″W	Littleton	
17	Little Estate	Little Estate	May 29, 1998 (#98000610)	1 Littleridge Ln. 39°38′58″N 104°58′10″W	Cherry Hills Village	
18	Littleton Main Street	Littleton Main Street	April 8, 1998 (#98000291)	Roughly along W. Main St. from S. Curtice St. to S. Sycamore St. 39°36′50″N 105°00′58″W	Littleton	
19	Littleton Post Office	Littleton Post Office	April 26, 2019 (#100003671)	5753 S. Prince St. 39°37′09″N 105°00′58″W	Littleton	
20	Littleton Town Hall	Littleton Town Hall	September 4, 1980 (#80000876)	2450 W. Main St. 39°36′48″N 105°00′59″W	Littleton	
21	Maitland Estate	Maitland Estate	September 3, 1998 (#98001130)	9 Sunset Dr. 39°38′52″N 104°57′35″W	Cherry Hills Village	
22	Melvin School	Melvin School	January 5, 1984 (#84000790)	4950 S. Laredo St. 39°37′34″N 104°48′09″W	Aurora	part of the Rural School Buildings in Colorado MPS
23	Owen Estate	Owen Estate	September 17, 1999 (#99001143)	3901 S. Gilpin St. 39°38′50″N 104°58′03″W	Cherry Hills Village	
24	Seventeen Mile House	Seventeen Mile House	October 6, 1983 (#83003501)	8181 S. Parker Rd. 39°34′05″N 104°47′14″W	Centennial	
25	William Smith House	William Smith House	September 26, 1985 (#85002565)	412 Oswego Ct. 39°43′17″N 104°50′58″W	Aurora	
26	South Dahlia Lane		December 12, 2025 (#100012015)	2401 - 2465 (odd numbers) South Dahlia Lane; 39°40′20″N 104°56′01″W	Holly Hills	Listing says "Denver"; South Dahlia Lane is actually in Holly Hills, an unincorporated exclave of Arapahoe County surrounded by Denver.

== See also ==
- List of National Historic Landmarks in Colorado
- List of National Register of Historic Places in Colorado
- Bibliography of Colorado
- Geography of Colorado
- History of Colorado
- Index of Colorado-related articles
- List of Colorado-related lists
- Outline of Colorado
