= East High School (Denver, Colorado) =

Public high school in Denver, Colorado

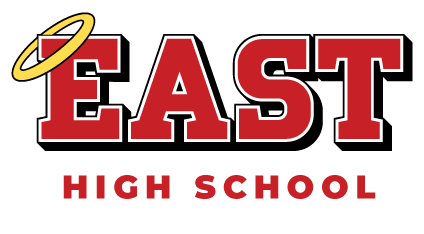

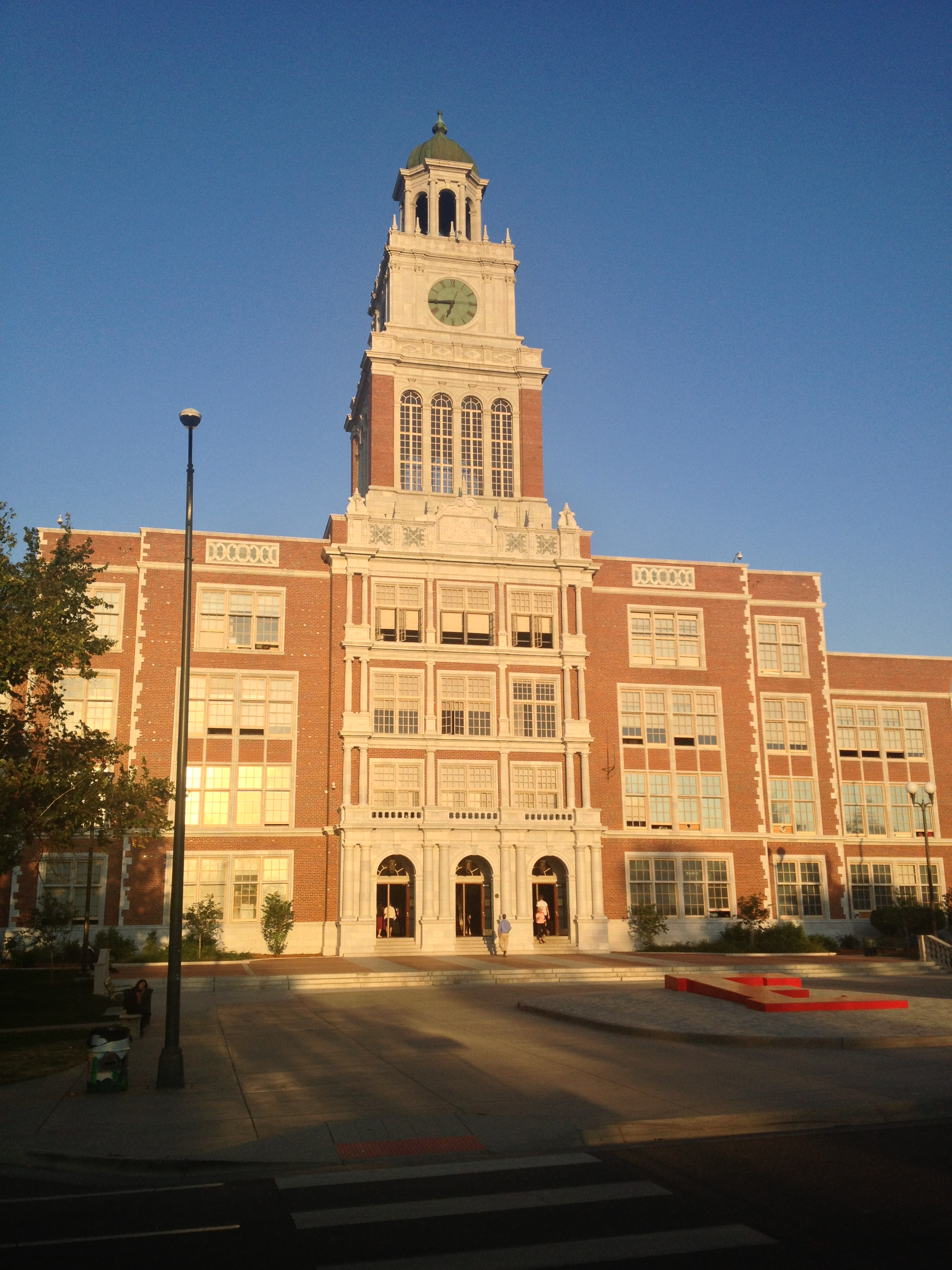
- Front of East High School in 2012

Location
- 1600 City Park Esplanade; Denver, Colorado 80206; United States; 39°44′30″N 104°57′22″W

Information
- Type: Public High School
- Established: 1876 (150 years ago)
- School district: Denver Public Schools
- CEEB code: 060400
- NCES School ID: 080336000338
- Principal: Terita Walker
- Teaching staff: 116.61 (on an FTE basis)
- Grades: 9–12
- Enrollment: 2,476 (2024–2025)
- Student to teacher ratio: 21.23
- Colors: Red and white
- Athletics: 6A
- Athletics conference: Denver Prep (5A Metro 2 for football)
- Nickname: Angels
- Newspaper: The Spotlight
- Yearbook: The Angelus
- Website: east.dpsk12.org
- East High School
- U.S. National Register of Historic Places
- Colorado State Register of Historic Properties
- Built: 1924
- Built by: Arvid Olson Invest. & Building Co.
- Architect: George Hebard Williamson
- Architectural style: Late 19th and 20th Century Revivals, Jacobethan Revival
- NRHP reference No.: 06000660
- CSRHP No.: 5DV.2091
- Added to NRHP: July 27, 2006

East High School is a historical public high school located in the City Park neighborhood on the east side of Denver, Colorado, United States. It is part of the Denver Public Schools system, and is one of four original high schools in Denver. The other three are West, North, and South.

== History ==
East High opened in 1875 and was the first high school in Denver. The first graduating class was in 1877. In 1889, it moved to 19th and Stout Street because of the need for more room. This location is now referred to as "Old East," and could accommodate 700 students.

The architect for the current facility was Denver native George H. Williamson, himself an 1893 graduate of "Old East" High. Williamson won national recognition for his design of the "new" East, which has a 162-foot (49 m) high clock tower modeled after Independence Hall in Philadelphia.

In early 1991, the East High building was declared an official Denver Historic Landmark by the Denver Landmark Commission and the Denver City Council.

In July 2005, a music video for the song "Over My Head (Cable Car)", by The Fray was filmed in East High.

East High has been repeatedly honored as one of America's top high schools. It was honored in 1957 as one of the country's top high schools and subsequently selected in 1968 as one of America's Top Ten Schools. In 2000 Newsweek recognized East as one of America's top hundred public high schools. In 2008, Newsweek again recognized East in its annual list of the country's "Top High Schools". It is ranked 23rd out of Colorado high schools and 974th nationally by U.S. News "Best High Schools".

The 2022–2023 school year saw three shootings at or near East High School. In September 2022, a male student was shot outside a recreation center next to campus. A 16-year-old student, Luis Garcia, was fatally shot near campus on 13 February 2023. On 22 March 2023, two male administrators were shot on campus by a student and transported to the hospital; the student was later found dead of what a coroner found to be a self-inflicted gunshot wound. In response, district superintendent Alex Marrero said that the school would have two armed police officers for the rest of the school year, and for the following 2023-2024 school year.

== Demographics ==
As of the 2022–2023 school year, East High School has a total enrollment of 2,501 students in grades nine through twelve.

- White: 52.4%
- Hispanic/Latino: 22%
- African American/Black: 14%
- Multiple Races: 8%
- Asian/Pacific Islander: 3%
- American Indian/Alaskan: <1%
- Native Hawaiian/Other: <1%

== Athletics ==
East High is ranked 3rd in the State of Colorado for greatest amount of State Championships with the Angels holding 99 total state championships; 91 in boys teams and 8 in girls teams. Additionally, teams representing Denver East outside of the Colorado High School Activities Association (CHSAA) as club teams have accumulated 11 combined state championships bringing the high school's count to 110 1st-place finishes since the early 1900s.

In 2007, the boys' basketball team was named the top-ranked team in the state by RISE Magazine and Sports Illustrated, and finished the season with another 5A state championship win, topping a season with a 22–3 record.

Denver East Angels Athletic State Championships- Colorado High School Activities Association (CHSAA) Sports
| Season | Sport | Number of Championships | Year |
|---|---|---|---|
| Fall | Cross Country, Boys | 5 | 1967, 1964, 1963, 1959, 1958 |
| Fall | Golf, Boys | 4 | 1952, 1951, 1949, 1947 |
| Fall | Tennis, Boys | 18 | 1968, 1967, 1965, 1964, 1959, 1958, 1957, 1956, 1955, 1951, 1949, 1943, 1939, 1938, 1936, 1934, 1933, 1931 |
| Fall | Soccer, Boys | 4 | 2022, 2011, 2008, 1994 |
| Fall | Gymnastics, Boys | 20 | |
| Fall | Football, Boys | 2 | 1962, 1949 |
| Winter | Basketball, Boys | 12 | 2023, 2014, 2008, 2007, 2004, 1999, 1996, 1965, 1964, 1952, 1951, 1943 |
| Winter | Basketball, Girls | 1 | 2010 |
| Winter | Hockey, Boys | 1 | 2022 |
| Winter | Swimming, Girls | 2 | 1994, 1992 |
| Winter | Wrestling, Boys | 1 | 1937 |
| Spring | Lacrosse, Boys | 1 | 2000 |
| Spring | Baseball, Boys | 2 | 1994, 1951 |
| Spring | Swimming, Boys | 2 | 1960, 1959 |
| Spring | Track and Field, Boys | 20 | 1966, 1965, 1964, 1960, 1953, 1948, 1946, 1945, 1944, 1942, 1941, 1939, 1937, 1936, 1907, 1906, 1905, 1904, 1903, 1902 |
| Spring | Track and Field, Girls | 3 | 1992, 1985, 1984 |
| Spring | Soccer, Girls | 1 | 1983 |
| Total | | 99 | |

Denver East Angels Athletic State Championships- Club Sports
| Season | Sport | Number of Championships | Year |
|---|---|---|---|
| Spring | Ultimate Frisbee, Boys | 2 | 2023, 2019, 2018 |
| Spring | Rugby, Boys | 10 | 2021-15's & 2021-7's, 2019, 2018, 2015, 2009, 2004, 2002, 1997, 1988 |
| Total | | 11 | |

== Academics and activities ==
=== Constitutional Law ===
Constitutional Law, or "Con-Law" as most Angels refer to it, is a large part of the academic extracurricular setting at East. The team, usually composed of 11th and 12th graders, has continuously traveled to Washington D.C. to compete in the Center for Civic Education's national "We the People: The Citizens and the Constitution" competition. This competition involves on average 54 other teams who have qualified by winning their state's competition and totals to around 300 students. The team has won 5 national titles with the most recent being in April 2019. Other national titles include 2009, 2008, 2007, and 1992.

=== Model United Nations ===
Model United Nations has been an active club at Denver East since the early 1980s. In recent years they have traveled to many conferences ranging from ones in Colorado, to ones at the national and international level. In February 2019, the team took 11 students to Birkerød, Denmark to compete against 400 other students, returning two 1st place or Best Delegate international recognitions. As well in 2019, East's Model U.N. team hosted a conference at Denver East High School that brought in over 200 competitors from 29 schools. In 2020, East traveled to Mexico City, Mexico for their 2nd international competition fielding 13 students and returning 5 international recognitions.

== Notable alumni ==
- Norman R. Augustine, aerospace businessman; Under Secretary of the Army 1975–77; currently serves as chairman of the Review of United States Human Space Flight Plans Committee
- Philip Bailey, member of Earth, Wind & Fire; inducted into the Rock and Roll Hall of Fame
- Jean Knight Bain, state legislator
- R. Stephen Berry, chemistry professor
- J. B. Bickerstaff, basketball head coach of the Detroit Pistons
- Jerome Biffle, track and field gold medalist at the 1952 Olympics
- Joan Birkland, Colorado state women's amateur golf and tennis champion
- Ward Bond, film actor
- Joe Barry Carroll, National Basketball Association All-Star
- Neal Cassady (attended for a short time), Beat generation icon; model for character Dean Moriarty in Jack Kerouac's novel On the Road, played a prominent role in the counter-culture of 1960s
- Herrick Chapman, associate professor of History and French Studies, New York University (1992–present)
- Nicholas Alexander Chavez, actor
- Don Cheadle, actor and Academy Award nominee
- Dan Cohn-Sherbok, Professor Emeritus of Judaism, University of Wales
- Judy Collins, folk and standards singer and songwriter
- Harlon L. Dalton, professor of law, Yale Law School
- Larry Dunn, member of Earth, Wind & Fire; inducted into the Rock and Roll Hall of Fame
- Alice Eastwood, valedictorian who became a prolific botanist and taxonomist
- Bruce Egloff, former Major League Baseball player
- Mamie Eisenhower, wife of President Dwight D. Eisenhower; First Lady of the United States from 1953 to 1961
- Douglas Fairbanks, was expelled from East High School; went on to become one of the most famous silent movie stars of all time
- Edwina Hume Fallis, educator, writer, and toy designer
- Bryan Fogel, playwright and author
- Bill Frisell, jazz guitarist
- Miriam Goldberg, newspaper publisher and editor
- Peter Groff, first African-American President Pro Tem of the Colorado Senate
- Regis Groff, East history teacher, 20-year member of the Colorado Senate
- Pam Grier, actress
- General Irving Hale, Spanish–American War veteran
- Elliot Handler, co-founder of Mattel and inventor of Hot Wheels
- Ruth Handler, co-founder of Mattel and inventor of Barbie
- Ronnie Harrell (born 1996), basketball player for Hapoel Gilboa Galil of the Israeli Basketball Premier League
- Christopher A. Hart, 13th Chairman of the National Transportation Safety Board
- General Robert T. Herres, first Vice Chairman of the Joint Chiefs of Staff
- Daniel Walker Howe, Pulitzer Prize for History; Rhodes Professor of American History Emeritus at Oxford University in England; Professor of History Emeritus at the University of California, Los Angeles
- Chuck Spafford Johnson, poet and published author; Lyricist, songwriter, and original lighting designer for the band Spafford
- Cobe Jones, former MLB player (Pittsburgh Pirates)
- Jamie Laurie (aka Jonny 5), singer/songwriter for The Flobots
- Barry Lersch, former MLB pitcher (Philadelphia Phillies) and (St Louis Cardinals)
- Harold Lloyd, silent film actor
- Hattie McDaniel, actress; first African American to win an Academy Award, for her performance in Gone with the Wind
- Stephen L.R. McNichols, Colorado governor (1957–1963)
- Ron Miles, jazz trumpeter, cornetist and composer
- T. J. Miller, comedian and actor, known for his role in the show Silicon Valley and the 2014 film Big Hero 6
- Yvie Oddly, winner of the eleventh season of RuPaul's Drag Race
- David Oliver, professional track athlete
- Antoinette Perry, stage actress; namesake of the Tony Awards
- Dianne Reeves, jazz vocalist (graduated from George Washington HS in Denver)
- Reese Roper, singer/songwriter for Five Iron Frenzy
- Maurice Rose, Major general in the United States Army during World War II and a World War I veteran. General Rose was at the time the highest-ranking Jew in the U.S. Army. Rose Medical Center in Denver, Colorado, was named in his honor.
- Brandon Shaffer, President of the Colorado Senate
- Sidney Sheldon, Academy Award-winning writer; created The Patty Duke Show (1963–66), I Dream of Jeannie (1965–70) and Hart to Hart (1979–84); best-selling novels include Master of the Game (1982), The Other Side of Midnight (1973) and Rage of Angels (1980); the seventh best selling fiction writer of all time
- George Gaylord Simpson, paleontologist and evolutionary biologist
- Charles Lewis Slattery, Episcopal Bishop of Massachusetts
- Robert F. Smith, businessman, investor, philanthropist, and wealthiest African-American.
- Jack Swigert, NASA astronaut and member of the Apollo 13 mission
- Donnette Thayer, songwriter, singer
- Edward D. White Jr., architect based in Denver, whose forty-year practice (1955–1995) focused on contemporary architecture and historic preservation
- Paul Whiteman, jazz composer and bandleader
- Stan Williams, former MLB player (Los Angeles Dodgers, New York Yankees, Cleveland Indians, Minnesota Twins, St. Louis Cardinals, Boston Red Sox)
- Andrew Woolfolk, member of Earth, Wind & Fire; inducted into the Rock and Roll Hall of Fame
- Bernard Wrightson, Olympic springboard diving gold medalist
- Jean Yancey, women's small business consultant and motivational speaker, inducted into Alumni Heritage Hall
