= Geneva Home =

- Geneva House
- U.S. National Register of Historic Places
- U.S. Historic district
- Colorado State Register of Historic Properties
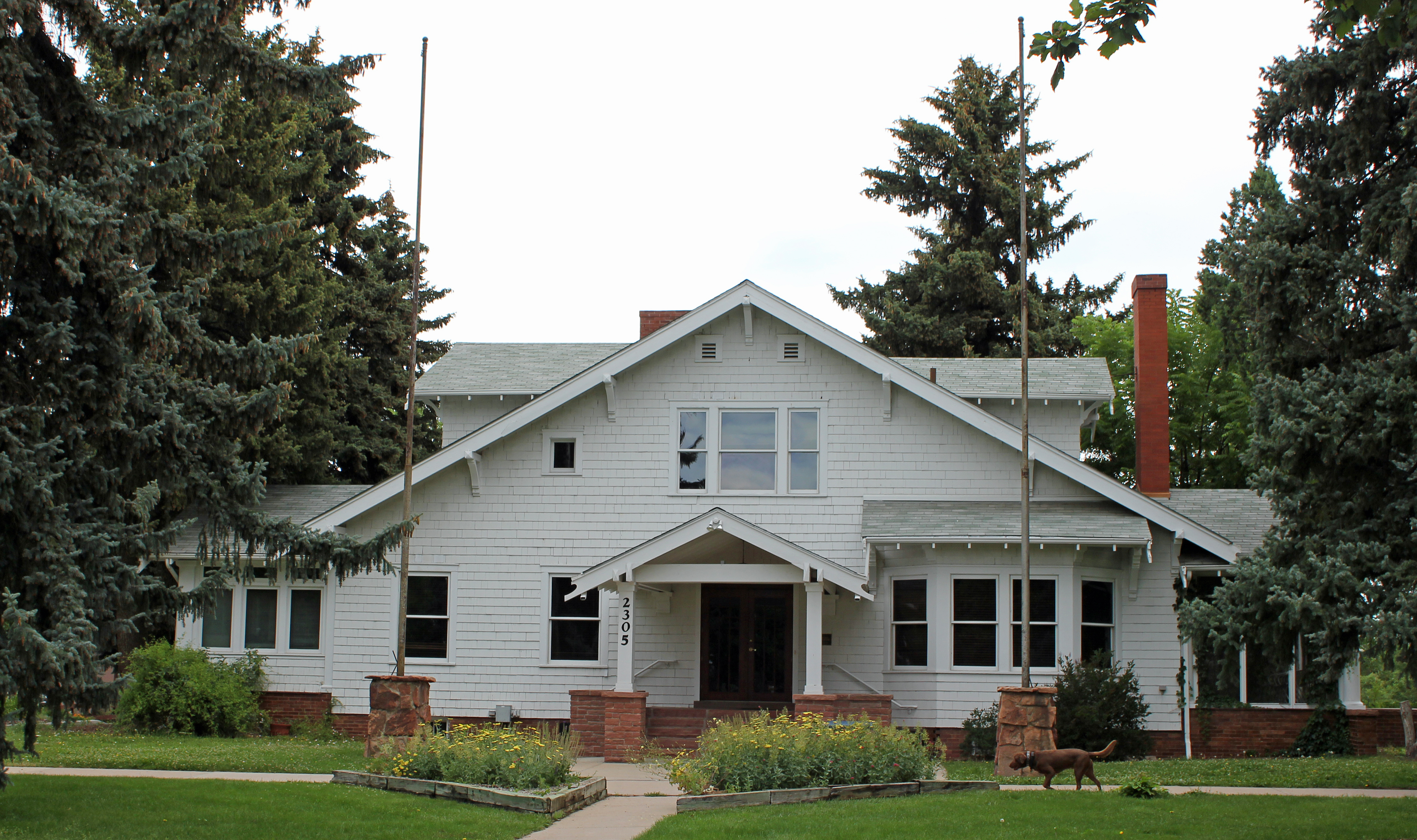

- Location within Colorado Location within the United States
- Location: 2305 W. Berry Ave., Littleton, Colorado
- Coordinates: 39°37′04″N 105°00′53″W
- Area: 0.8 acres (0.32 ha)
- Built: 1927
- Architectural style: Craftsman
- NRHP reference No.: 98001635
- CSRHP No.: 5AH.729
- Added to NRHP: January 21, 1999

The Geneva Home, at 2305 W. Berry Ave. in Littleton, Colorado, is a one-and-a-half-story Craftsman-style frame house. It was listed on the National Register of Historic Places in 1999.

In 1927 the International Geneva Association purchased the property of what is now the Geneva home. It was a working farm before it was bought in 1927. It was used as a recuperative care facility for hotel and restaurant workers. The City of Littleton bought the property in 1975, and it fell into disrepair for over 20 years while the building was used as storage and the city planned on demolishing it, until it was saved from demolition.

== See also ==
- National Register of Historic Places listings in Arapahoe County, Colorado
