= Hopkins Farm (Cherry Hills Village, Colorado) =

- U.S. National Register of Historic Places
- U.S. Historic district
- Colorado State Register of Historic Properties
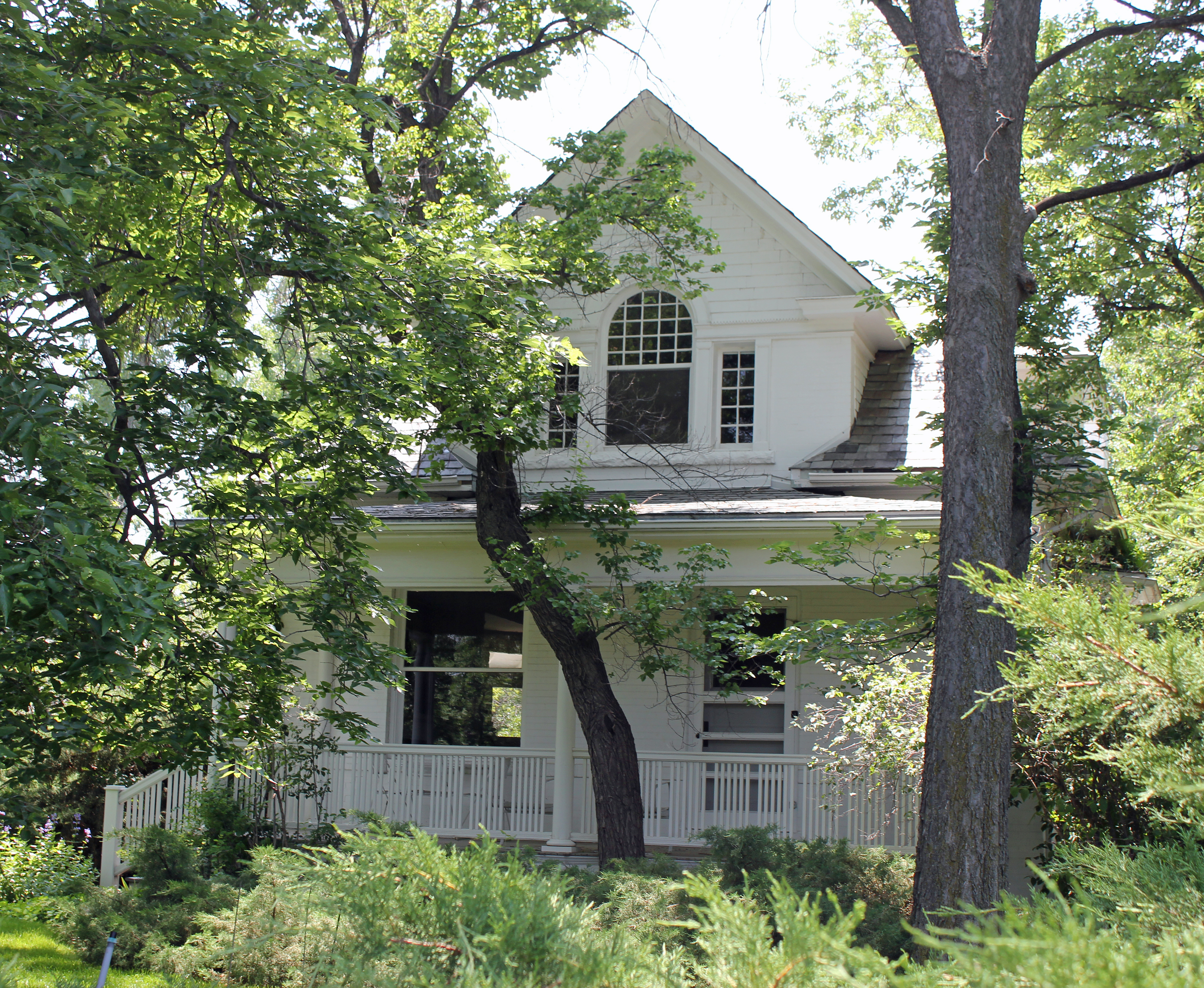
- The farmhouse in 2014.

- Location within Colorado Location within the United States
- Location: 4400 E. Quincy Ave., Englewood, Colorado
- Coordinates: 39°38′15″N 104°56′17″W
- Area: 17.6 acres (7.1 ha)
- Architect: Roland Linder
- Architectural style: Late 19th and 20th Century Revival: Colonial Revival; Classic Cottage
- NRHP reference No.: 07000341
- CSRHP No.: 5AH.2932
- Added to NRHP: April 24, 2007

The Hopkins Farm is a home located at 4400 East Quincy Avenue in Cherry Hills Village, Colorado. The home is a 1 1/2-story house that is surrounded by a 1930s agricultural area and additional buildings. The farm was one of many dairy operations in the area.

== See also ==
- National Register of Historic Places listings in Arapahoe County, Colorado
