= Seventeen Mile House =

- U.S. National Register of Historic Places
- U.S. Historic district
- Colorado State Register of Historic Properties
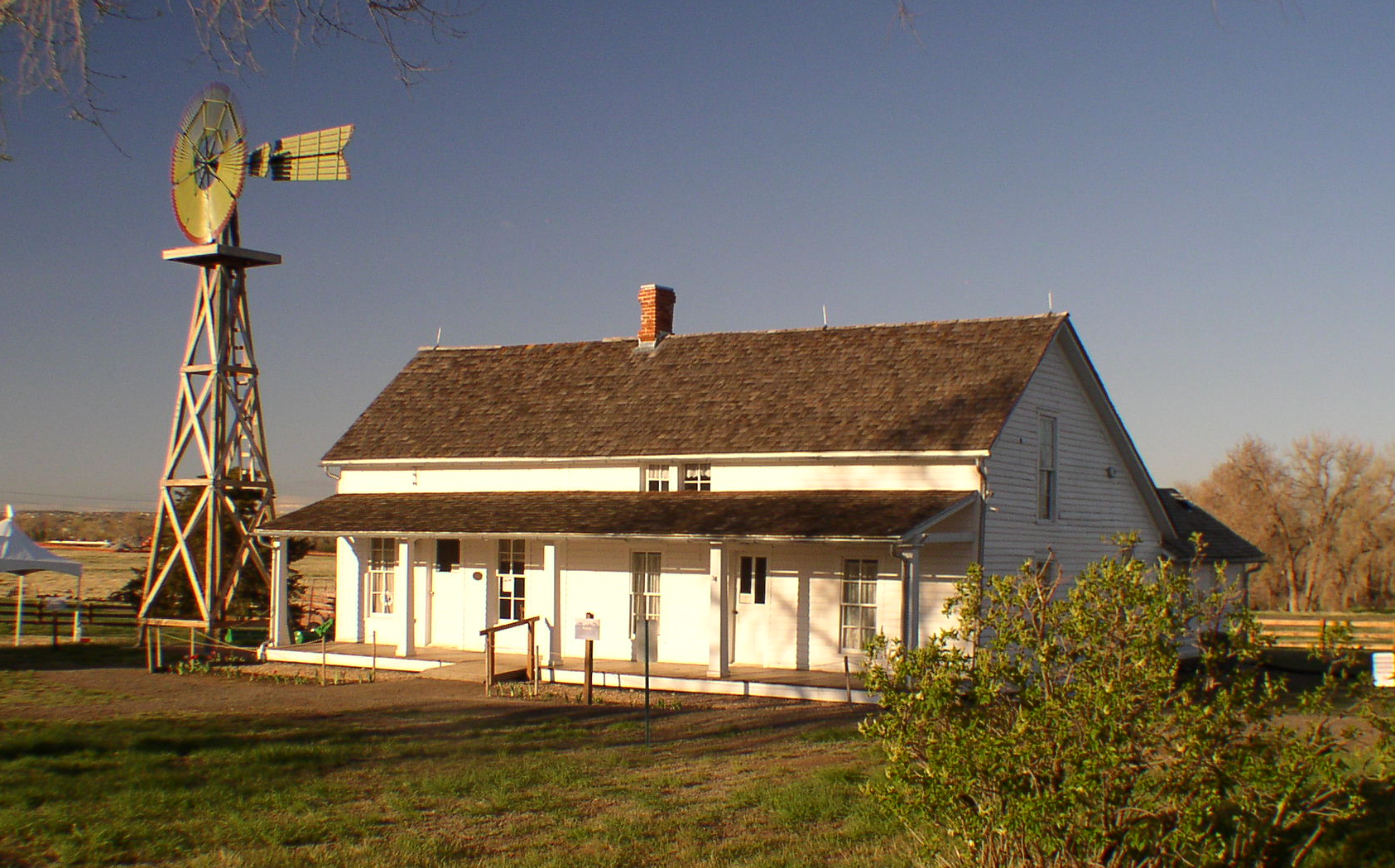

- Location within Colorado Location within the United States
- Nearest city: Centennial, Colorado
- Coordinates: 39°34′5″N 104°47′14″W
- Area: 4.5 acres (1.8 ha)
- Built: 1886
- NRHP reference No.: 83003501
- CSRHP No.: 5AH.17
- Added to NRHP: October 6, 1983

The Seventeen Mile House is a historic site and open space located at 8181 S. Parker Rd. in Centennial, Colorado. It is a 33-acre former stagecoach stop with a square log structure covered with clapboard. It was a stopping place during the 1800s along the Smoky Hill Trail. It is one of the last two remaining trail houses left on the trail. Mary Hightower was the original owner of the house, having moved there in 1866. It was almost torn down in 1977 until negative publicity stopped it from happening. The site was zoned for commercial development until the County of Arapahoe acquired the land in 2001.

== History ==
The first Colorado Gold Rush in 1858-1859 began an influx of horse and wagon traffic to Denver, and two of the routes were the historic Smoky Hill Trail from Kansas and Cherokee Trail from Oklahoma. Six way stations sprang up along Cherry Creek, serving travelers in the final stretch into Denver after the two trails merged.

Railroad service reached Denver in 1870, and the wagon trails gradually fell into disuse. Seventeen Mile House closed and became a working farm alongside the Cherry Creek River by the 1880s. It is one of two surviving Way Stations. The stations were named according to how many miles each site is from downtown Denver's intersection of Colfax and Broadway. Four Mile House is the other way station still standing.

== Current Site and Future Plans ==
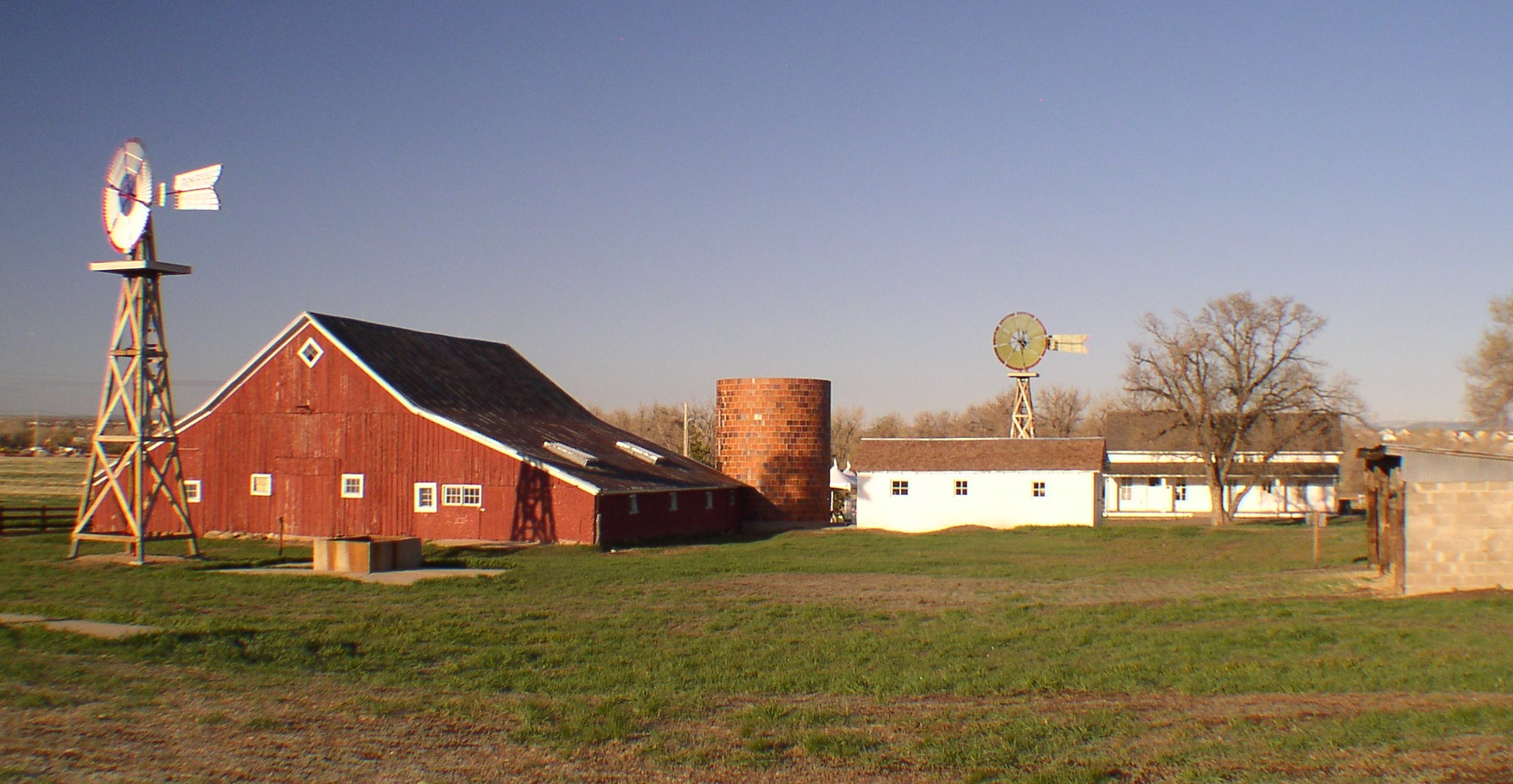
Today Seventeen Mile House shows the layout as of the 1910s, long after it became a working farm.

In 2001, local historic and preservation groups worked together to acquire the property for Arapahoe County. Arapahoe County has a 2007 Master Plan for Seventeen Mile House serving as vision and roadmap.

Today the site is an Open Space park administered by Arapahoe County, Colorado, with the Cherry Creek Valley Historical Society giving monthly open house tours, and involved in preservation and development. An annual Fall Festival has been held in recent years.

This Open Space borders two other Open Spaces, thus contributing to a regional corridor for wildlife areas and biking/hiking trails along the Cherry Creek Valley, which includes Denver's extensive Cherry Creek Reservoir State Park.

== See also ==
- National Register of Historic Places listings in Arapahoe County, Colorado
