= Gully Homestead =

- U.S. National Register of Historic Places
- U.S. Historic district
- Colorado State Register of Historic Properties
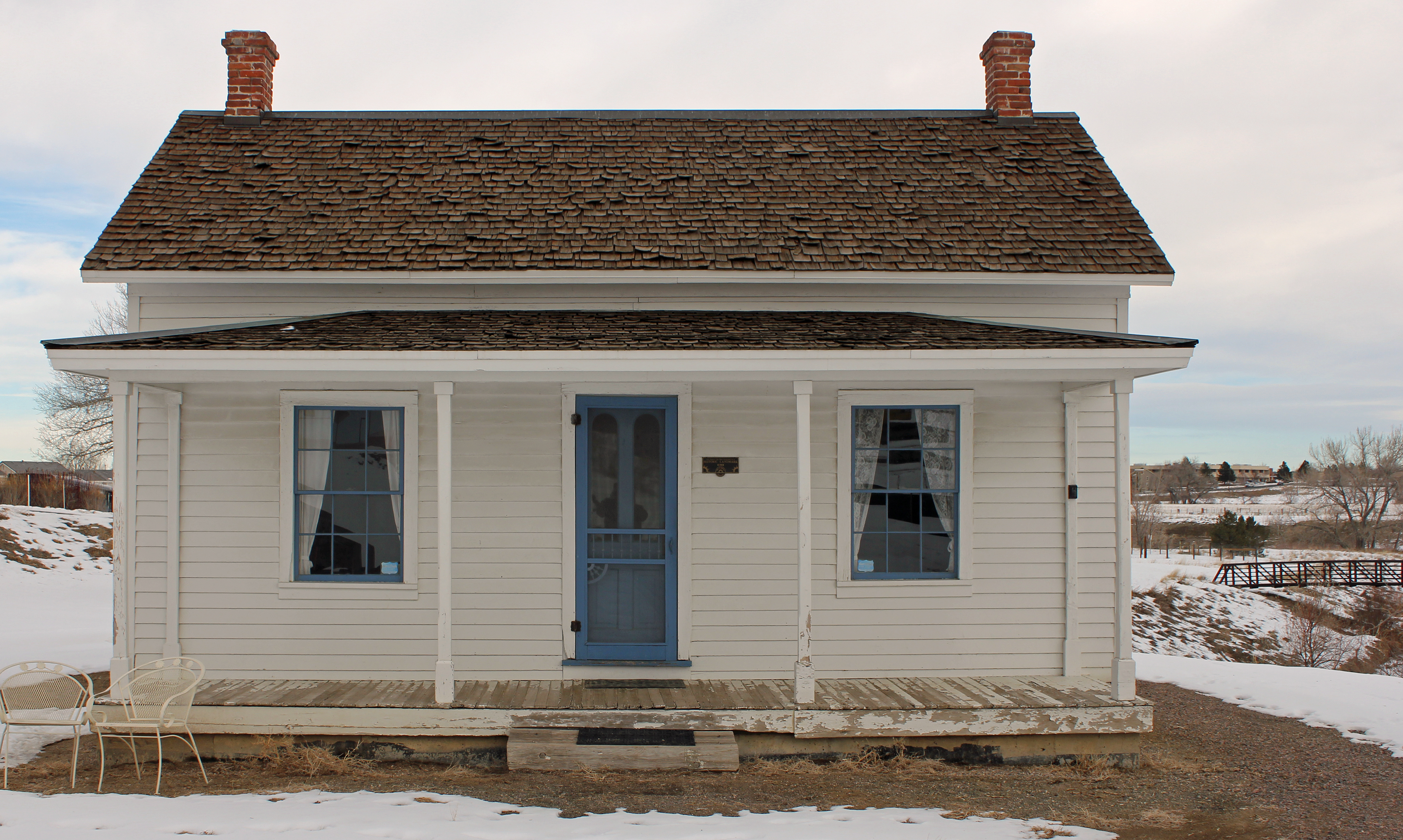

- Location within Colorado Location within the United States
- Location: 200 S. Chambers Rd., Aurora, Colorado
- Coordinates: 39°42′44″N 104°48′32″W
- Area: 1.3 acres (0.53 ha)
- NRHP reference No.: 86000022
- CSRHP No.: 5AH.204
- Added to NRHP: January 9, 1986

The Gully Homestead is a former homestead located at 200 S. Chambers Road in Aurora, Colorado, United States.

Thomas Gully, his wife Temperance, and their four children came to Colorado in 1862. Thomas, an Irish immigrant, moved to the Colorado Territory to work in the mines, but decided to try his hand at farming shortly after.

The Gullys claimed 11,000 acres near the Toll Gate Creek and built a small log home.

It operated as a ranch by his descendants until the 1950s. The home also served as a community center and a polling place.

The farm house, believed to be the oldest home in Aurora, consists of two parts; the kitchen (ca. 1866), and the main house, believed to be built in 1870. The two sections are connected.

The home sat vacant from the early 1950s until 1978. It was determined to be sitting in a floodplain. The developer who owned the house donated it to the city with the stipulation the house would be moved.

It was relocated to its current site, in the DeLaney Farm Historic District, along with a chicken coop in 1982, and restored the home in 1983. The City of Aurora established the area as a park.

The house came into ownership by the city of Aurora in 1978. The City restored the home and it is open for tours and school trips.

Several structures stand on the property, including the 1902 Round Barn, a 1949 shed, a privy and the Delaney house, ca. 1890. The Coal Creek School House (1920) sits on the edge of the site.

== See also ==
- National Register of Historic Places listings in Arapahoe County, Colorado
