= David W. Brown House =

- U.S. National Register of Historic Places
- Colorado State Register of Historic Properties
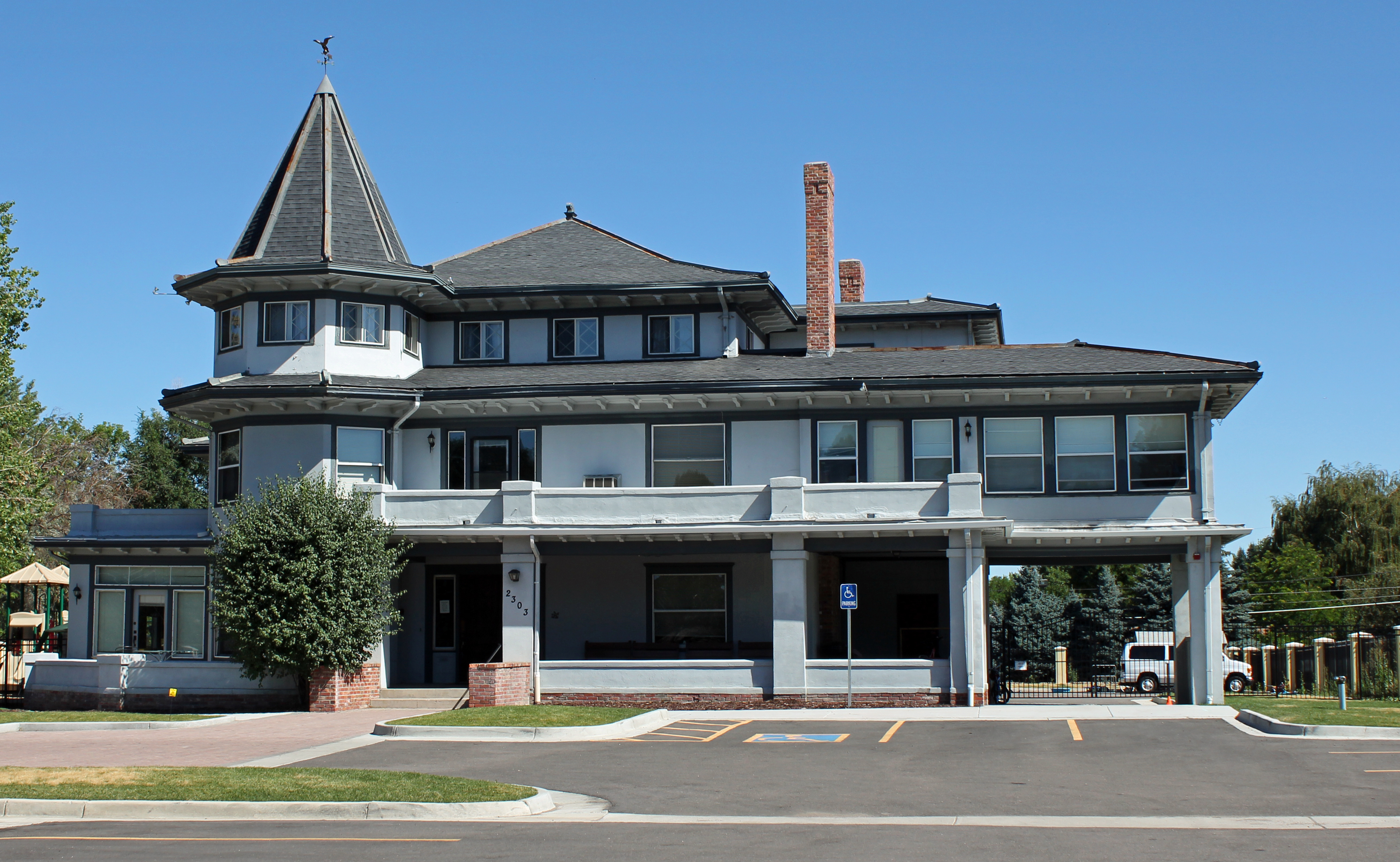

- Location within Colorado Location within the United States
- Nearest city: Englewood, Arapahoe County, Colorado
- Coordinates: 39°39′38″N 104°57′38″W
- Area: 2.5 acres (1.0 ha)
- Architect: George H. Williamson
- Architectural style: Prairie
- NRHP reference No.: 80000875
- CSRHP No.: 5AH.162
- Added to NRHP: April 10, 1980

The David W. Brown House is a home located at 2303 E. Dartmouth. in Englewood, Colorado. An example of Prairie style the house was built and occupied by David W. Brown (1864-1922), who built the coal-mining Rocky Mountain Fuel Company. The house has 18 rooms and 6 fireplaces.

It was designed by architect George H. Williamson, and was listed on the National Register of Historic Places in 1980.

It is an irregular three-and-a-half-story structure.

== See also ==
- National Register of Historic Places listings in Arapahoe County, Colorado
