= DeLaney Barn =

- U.S. National Register of Historic Places
- U.S. Historic district
- Colorado State Register of Historic Properties
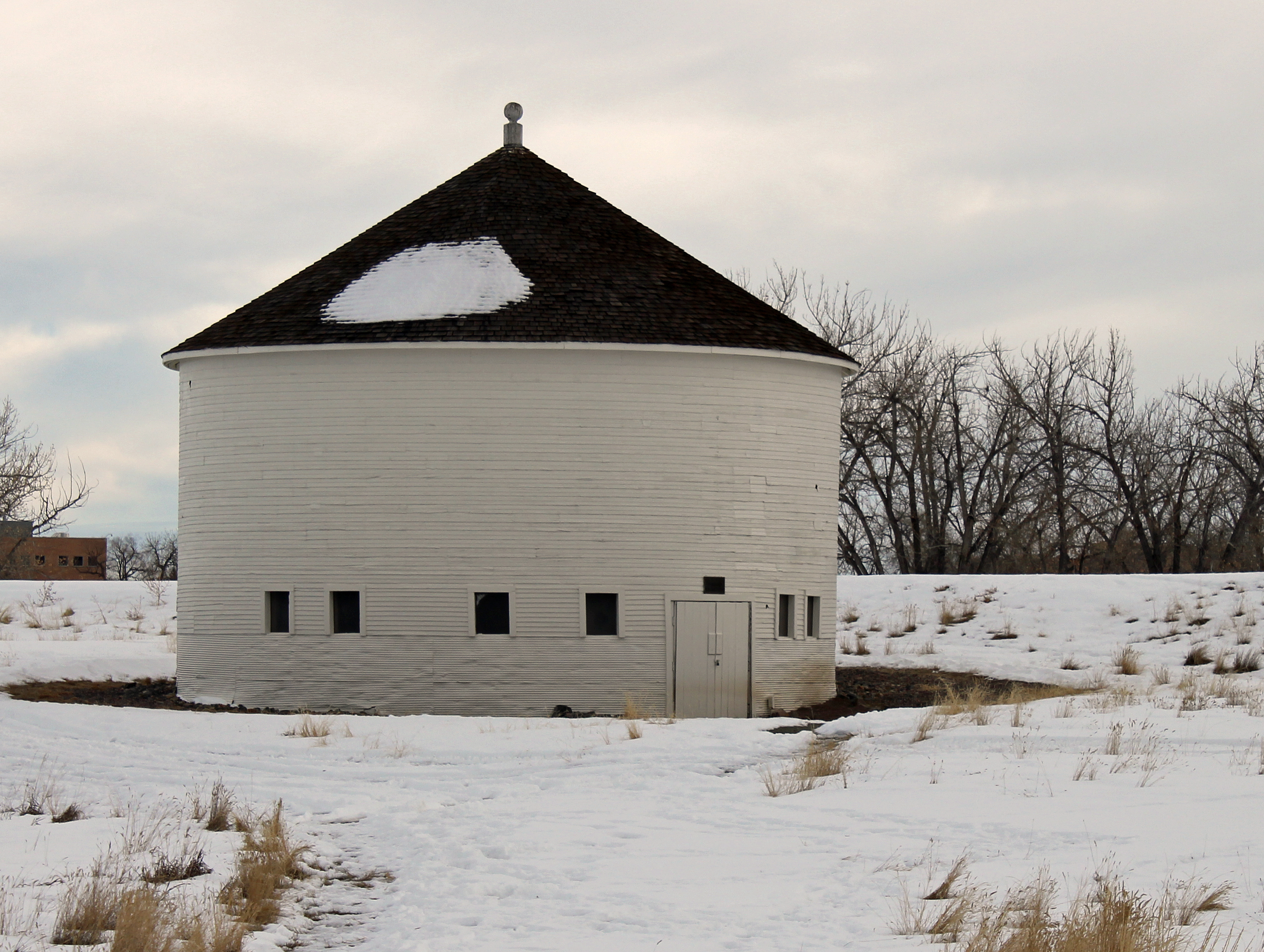
- The barn in December, 2011.

- Location within Colorado Location within the United States
- Location: 200 S. Chambers Rd., Aurora, Colorado
- Coordinates: 39°42′48″N 104°48′27″W
- Area: 1 acre (0.40 ha)
- Built: c.1900
- Architectural style: Round barn
- NRHP reference No.: 89000010
- CSRHP No.: 5AH.457
- Added to NRHP: February 9, 1989

The Delaney Barn is the barn of a former homestead located at 170 S. Chambers Road in Aurora, Colorado. It seems to be the only historic round barn surviving in Colorado today. Horses, dairy cattle and other livestock were raised on this farm. It serves as an important piece of early twentieth century architecture. Now part of the 160 acre DeLaney Historic District with restored farm buildings.

It was built c.1900.

== See also ==
- National Register of Historic Places listings in Arapahoe County, Colorado
