= Jean Knight Bain =

Colorado politician

Jean Knight Bain (1909–1999) was a state legislator in Colorado from Denver. A Republican, she served in the Colorado House of Representatives from 1961 to 1972.

She was born Elizabeth Jean Knight. She graduated from East High School in Denver in 1927 and the University of Colorado Boulder.

In 1959, her occupation was listed as housewife. In 1963 she was one of six women serving in the Colorado House. History Colorado has a collection of her papers.
