= Littleton Main Street =

- U.S. National Register of Historic Places
- U.S. Historic district
- Colorado State Register of Historic Properties
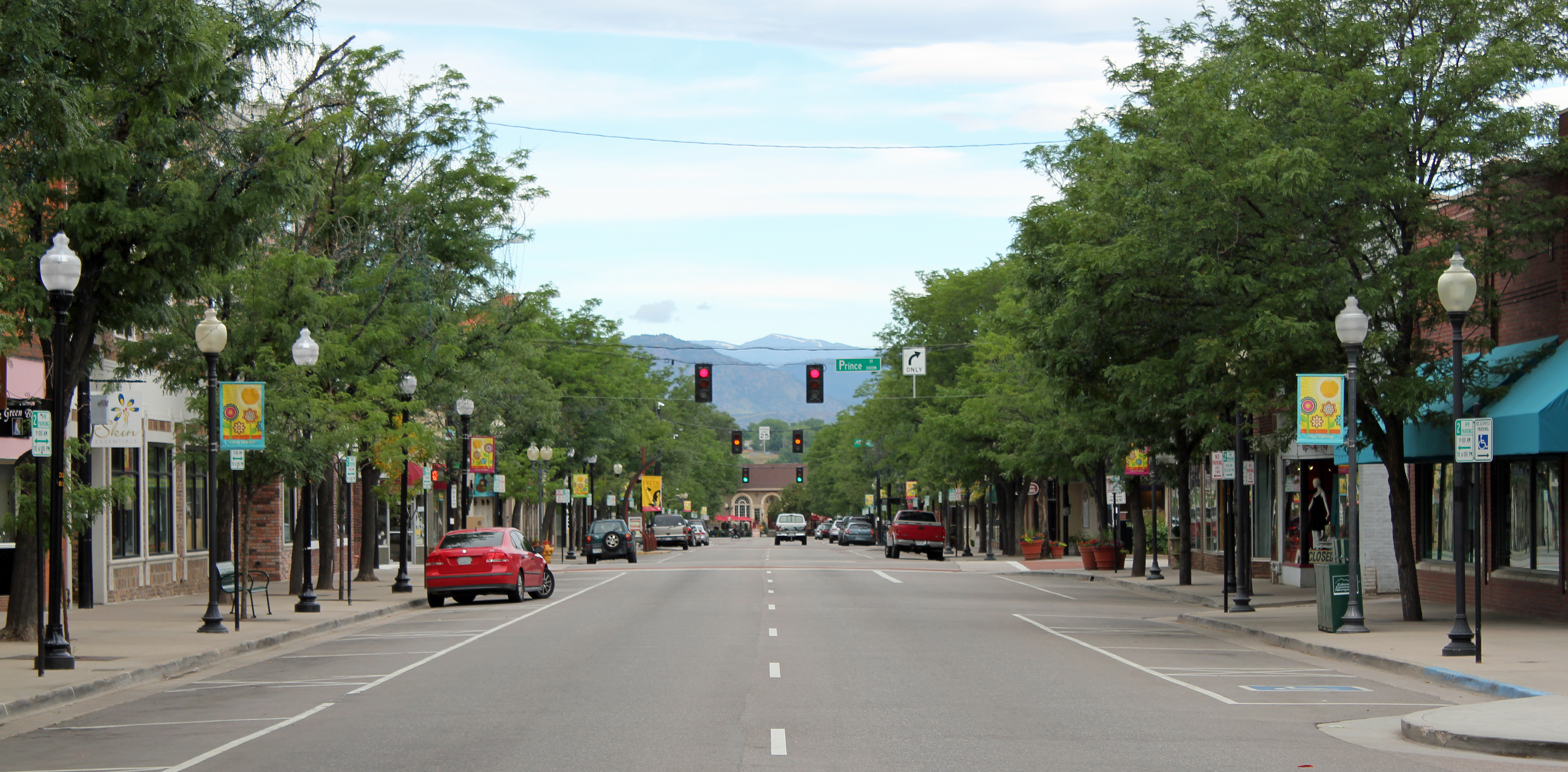

- Location within Colorado Location within the United States
- Location: Roughly along W. Main St., from S. Curtice St. to S. Sycamore St., Littleton, Colorado
- Coordinates: 39°36′50″N 105°0′58″W
- Area: 8 acres (3.2 ha)
- Architect: Jules J.B. Benedict
- Architectural style: Early Commercial, Italianate, Moderne
- NRHP reference No.: 98000291
- CSRHP No.: 5AH.1430
- Added to NRHP: April 8, 1998

The Littleton Main Street is a historic district located along W. Main Street, from South Curtice Street, to South Sycamore Street in Littleton, Colorado. The district dates from 1890. The nineteenth century buildings are red pressed brick, many with stone foundations and trim. These buildings replaced smaller frame structures from the pioneer era and proclaimed the success of their builders through solid construction and application of exterior ornament.

== Contributing Buildings ==
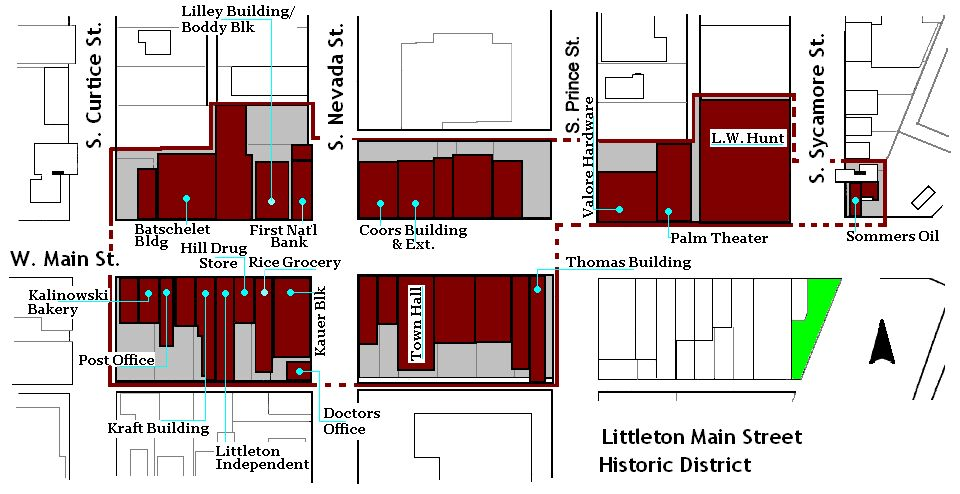
Littleton Main Street Historic District, based on the map provided in the nomination forms.

=== West Main Street ===
- 2299 West Main Street, Sommers Oil Service Station, 1922. The Service Station is early evidence of the impact of the automobile. Built in 1922 by the Sommers Oil Company of Denver. Built as two buildings, the filling station and the greasing facility were joined at a late date. The south building is built of narrow concrete blocks with a hipped roof. The drive-through was set on piers. The greasing facility has a flat roof with parapet and elaborate coping.
- 2329 West Main Street, LW. Hunt Building, 1919, Ivy W. Hunt erected his Ford car dealership. The large, rectangular building includes the original one-story auto dealership and a stepped back modern rooftop addition. The red pressed brick walls have paneled piers and decorative white brick insets forming the letter "H". The building has a flat roof with piers, which project above the roof, contrasting white concrete coping, and courses of molded brick. The large central entrance facing Main Street is surrounded with glazed white brick and has inset double doors with rectangular lights topped by a divided transom. A plaque above the entrance is inscribed "I.W. Hunt 1919." Flanking the entrance are huge plate glass display windows with smooth white concrete sills, clerestory windows, and fabric awnings. In the mid-1980s, the Urban Design Group produced a three-story stepped back brick addition with central, gabled, glazed atrium, and rehabilitated the original building. The 1919 portion of the building retains its original design, scale, materials, feeling, and association, while the sympathetic 1980s addition is subtly setback to diminish its impact on the earlier building.
- 2359 West Main Street, Palm Theater, 1925, Unknown, Twentieth Century Commercial. As motion pictures became popular, J.H. Peterson built the Palm Theater in 1925. The double-height one-story building has a flat roof with projecting piers and brick coping and a molded metal secondary cornice. The walls are composed of painted, wire-drawn brick on the front and pressed brick on the sides. The central inset entrance has a door with large rectangular light and transom flanked by large plate glass windows. Above the secondary cornice is a central ribbon of five multi-light windows with shared sill flanked on each end by paired windows. An alley is adjacent to the east wall of the building. The building has a one-story rear addition with garage door. The theater operated only a few years and the building was remodeled by the 1930s as a department store, with entrance and windows in the current configuration.
- 2379-99 West Main Street, Valore Hardware, 1925. This one-story brick building was erected by A.J. Valore in 1925 to house his hardware business and two other enterprises. The red brick building, with three storefronts facing Main Street has a flat roof with contrasting white brick coping and is divided into three bays by piers of red and white brick. The storefronts have inset entrances with glazed doors flanked by plate glass display windows with continuous metal lintels. Walls above lintels have panels outlined in white brick. The eastern storefront has a thin, projecting, metal hood above the windows. The west wall has decorative brickwork and two multi-light windows with lintels and sills of white brick. Alterations include removal of clerestory windows and addition of stone veneer under display windows. Piers and parapets originally projected above the roof.
- 2400 West Main Street, Thomas Building, 1954. Local civic leader and real estate developer Ulva C. Thomas built this corner commercial building in 1954. The building, which occupied part of the location of an earlier commercial structure, maintained the street wall by employing the same setback as the earlier building. The one-story rectangular buff brick building has a beveled corner with glazed door with sidelights and transom facing the intersection on the northeast. The building has a flat roof with a raised parapet at the center of the east wall. Five storefronts with slightly inset entrances and plate glass windows with concrete sills are on the east. The northern part of the building has been partially clad with Roman brick. The south and west walls are stuccoed. Other alterations include some glazed doors and newer plate glass windows and covered up entrances on the east and south.
- 2450 West Main Street, Littleton Town Hall, 1920, J.J.B. Benedict. When local officials requested a town hall whose front would "have a character that would dominate the design," architect J.J.B. Benedict drew inspiration from the Palazzo della Regione in Vincenza, Italy. The front of the Italian Renaissance style two-and-a-halfstory building is clad with architectural terra cotta blocks cast to resemble stone and hand molded ornamentation. The first story features an arcade of triple pointed arch entrances accentuated by archivolt molding. Flanking the central arch are lanterns Grafted by Benedict from old iron balconies. On the second story, a central arcade of five, slender, pointed arch windows with polychromatic ornaments and small columns is flanked by two similar windows facing wrought iron balconets. The flat roof building is crowned by a projecting, tiled cornice with modillions. The building has been altered by enclosing the three arches of the first story arcade with multi-light doors, sidelights, and overdoors, and by a 1980s rear concrete block addition not visible from the front. The building is listed in the National Register of Historic Places and is a designated Littleton landmark.
- 2485 West Main Street, Coors Building Extension, 1906. In 1906, a one-story addition to the Coors building was erected containing three storefronts. The buff brick building has a flat roof with concrete coping, a simple molded brick cornice, and a rooftop flagpole at the southeast corner. The front wall has a shopfront cornice above its three bays divided by brick piers. Two western bays have large plate glass display windows with paneled kickplates, while the eastern bay has an inset entrance with paneled and glazed door flanked by display windows with paneled kickplates. The building was renovated in 1990. Entrances were removed from the two western bays.
- 2489 West Main Street, Coors Building, 1905, Adolph Coors of Golden erected this significant two-story corner business block, which included five storefronts on the ground floor and space for a gentlemen's club above. The buff brick building has a flat roof stepped up at the southwest corner with plaques inscribed "COORS" and a projecting cornice with dentil molding, as well as a storefront cornice. The second story features evenly spaced sash windows between brick pilasters rising from a stone sill course. The first story has an inset beveled wall at the southwest, with the cantilevered upper story supported by a metal column. The front (south) wall is divided by metal pilasters between plate glass windows with clerestory windows and paneled kickplates. The first story of the west wall has segmental arched windows and a paneled door with arched transom. The building was restored in the 1990s. The building is a designated Littleton landmark.
- 2500 West Main Street, Kauer Block, 1899, F.C. Eberley. In 1899, August Kauer erected this two-story corner commercial block with lava stone foundation and trim and used part of the building for his meat market. The flat roof building has a molded brick cornice and shop front cornice. Pilasters divide the upper story into four bays, each bay is enframed with molded brick and has two windows with shared stone sills. A shingled mansard overhangs the first story, which is divided into two storefronts flanking a central entrance to the upper story. The storefronts have paired plate glass display windows with architectural tile under the windows.
- 2509 West Main Street, First National Bank of Littleton, 1905. The First National Bank of Littleton and local residents Mr. and Mrs. Harry Lilley collaborated in the construction of this two-story painted brick business block. The corner building has a flat roof pierced by short brick pilasters topped by finials. Spaces between the finials are ornamented with a parapet with an elongated sawtooth pattern, beneath which is a projecting cornice with arcaded cornice trim. The upper story has evenly spaced windows with stone sills and brick molding. The first story is surmounted by a secondary cornice and has a beveled inset wall on the southeast; the cantilevered upper story of the southeast corner is supported by a brick pier. Plate glass display windows of the first story sheltered by fabric awnings, are topped by clerestory windows. Walls under windows are clad with stacked brick. The east wall has a large arched window and a slab door with stone threshold. The first story has been altered with new display windows and new brick under the windows.
- 2516 West Main Street, Rice Grocery, 1932. This one-story brick commercial building originally housed a grocer and a dry cleaner and later a meat market. The building has a flat roof with brick coping and walls of painted, wiredrawn brick; newer Roman brick is under the windows. An off-center brick pier divides the building into two bays. The entrance on the east has an inset door and transom. A single plate glass display window with clerestory window is adjacent to the door; a ribbon of display windows is west of the pier. This building is a designated Littleton landmark.
- 2529-39 West Main Street, Lilley Building/Boddy Block, 1906. This two-story brick building was erected by Harry H. Lilley about 1906 and housed three commercial establishments and the Arapahoe County offices before the courthouse was completed in Littleton the following year. The brick building filled the gap between two buildings owned by Lilley and was designed to continue the pilasters, parapet, cornice and ornamentation of the building to the east. The upper story of the building has a central group of four windows flanked by groups of two windows. The windows are each framed with brick and have rock-faced stone sills linked by a course of brick. The first story is sheltered by a shingled mansard overhang above two storefronts with metal frame plate glass windows and glazed doors. The first story has been completely remodeled and the brick has been painted.
- 2530 West Main Street, O.G. Hill Drug Store, 1886. This small one-story commercial building was erected by O.G. Hill to house his pioneer drug store on Rapp Street in 1886. In 1900, the building was moved to this lot on Main Street and historic photographs indicate that its stepped brick parapet with geometric insets had been added by 1911. The lower portion of the front wall has been remodeled with an inset, angled, stuccoed wall leading to the entrance and paired plate glass windows.
- 2546 West Main Street, Littleton Independent, 1906. The Littleton Independent, the town's longest-lived newspaper, constructed this building for its office and printing plant in 1906. The two-story painted brick building has a flat roof with paneled and molded cornice and the upper story is divided by pilasters into two bays, each with a segmental arched window with arched hood molding and rock-faced stone sill. The first story has a center, recessed entrance flanked by angled walls and plate glass display windows. A secondary entrance on the west has a paneled and glazed door. Alterations include painted brick, stacked brick under the display windows, casement windows on the second story, and newer door at the western entrance.
- 2550 West Main Street, Kraft Building, 1903. This two-story painted brick building was erected by Henry Kraft in 1903 to house a dry goods and notions store on the first floor and meeting hall on the upper story. The building's design has much in common with Littleton's commercial buildings of the previous century. The building has a flat roof with molded brick and a brick corbel table. The second story has four tall, narrow, transomed, segmental arched windows with rock-faced stone sills. Above the windows is a course of decorative molding. The first story includes an off-center, inset entrance with wood paneling flanked by plate glass display windows topped by clerestory windows covered with paneling and with stacked brick under display windows. The first story storefront has been remodeled.
- 2580 West Main Street, Littleton Post Office, 1893. This two-story painted brick commercial building with Italianate commercial details was an early location of the Littleton post office. The flat roof rectangular building has an elaborately paneled cornice and decorative stringcourses. Second story walls are divided into two bays and enframed by pilasters. Each bay features a window with segmental arched transom, hood molding, and a stone sill. The remodeled first story is clad with horizontal board siding and has a central entrance flanked by projecting, above ground, hipped roof display windows.
- 2559 West Main Street, Lilley Livery Stable, 1907. Harry H. Lilley erected this building as a livery stable about 1907, replacing an earlier frame building of the same function. The two-story painted brick building continues the pilasters, parapet, cornice, and ornamentation of the two buildings to the east. The upper story has three groups of two windows with rockfaced stone sills linked by a course of brick. Each window is enframed with brick; the windows have been bricked in. The first story, which has a single storefront, has been remodeled with board and batten siding above angled plate glass display windows sheltered by metal and fiberglass hoods. The building had an eastern storefront by 1914 and two western storefronts were added by the 1930s.
- 2560-64 West Main Street, Dana Downing Grocery, 1905. This building was erected in 1905 to house a grocery and was described as "the big daylight store." The two-story brick building has a flat roof, corbel table, and courses of molded brick. The second story features two windows with wide rock-faced stone lintels and stone sills and paneled shutters. The first story is clad with simulated masonry and has corner pilasters and a central inset entrance area clad with shingles and flanked by large display windows. Alterations include addition of simulated masonry and wood shingles to first story and painting of brick and stone. A secondary western entrance has a newer door and covered up transom.
- 2569-75 West Main Street, Batschelet Building, 1908. Cattleman and investor Edward F. Batschelet erected this business block, which contained storefronts on the first story and a meeting hall on the second in 1908. The two-story building has a flat roof with projecting, bracketed cornice with dentil molding and a storefront cornice. The painted brick walls have a continuous sill course on the second story and a brick string course with stone insets. Large windows with architrave surrounds are evenly spaced on the second story. The first story has four entrances with doors with large rectangular lights and transoms flanked by large plate glass display windows with wood kickplates sheltered by awnings. The first story of the building was converted to an auto garage in the early twentieth century and restored to storefronts after 1955. The building is a designated Littleton landmark.
- 2570 West Main Street, Kalinowski Bakery, 1890s. Charles Kalinowski operated a bakery in this building, which appears on the 1893 Sanborn map. The two-story, flat roof, painted brick commercial building has a projecting, elaborately ornamented metal cornice with decorative molding and brackets. The second story is divided by narrow pilasters into three bays, each with a segmental arched window with hood molding and stone sill. The remodeled first story is surmounted by a steel lintel and has a central entrance with angled wall flanked by plate glass display windows enframed by piers of stacked brick.
- 2590 West Main Street, Spotswood Building/Burden Meat, 1890s. In 1893, this two-story corner building was a meat market. The building has a cornice of molded brick with a central projecting bracket. The upper floor has brick pilasters with corbelled bases and has transomed windows. A continuous stone lintel and sill courses and molding between the courses. The first story has been remodeled with horizontal board siding, an inset entrance, and a bay window.

== Side Streets ==
- 5686 South Sycamore Street, Franzen Grocery, 1920. Cornelius Franzen built this one-story grocery store in 1920. It has a flat roof with a parapet only on the front. A suspended metal awning shelters the off center entrance and a large window opening.
- 5717 South Nevada Street, Medical Offices, 1951. A two-story Art Moderne brick building housed doctors' offices. It has a curved corners with glass blocks lights. The flat roof has a coping curved, and with a projecting hood covering the first floor. The entrance is in a curved project at the northeast corner. The front wall of the Glass brickirst story has a ribbon of plate glass windows, with architectural tiles above and below.

== See also ==
- National Register of Historic Places listings in Arapahoe County, Colorado
