= Edwina Hume Fallis =

American writer (1876–1957)

- Born: November 15, 1876; Denver, Colorado
- Died: September 14, 1957 (aged 80); Denver, Colorado
- Occupations: Educator, writer, poet, toy designer
- Notable work: When Denver and I Were Young (1956)

Edwina Hume Fallis (November 15, 1876 – September 14, 1957) was an American educator, writer, poet, and toy designer. Her memoir for children, When Denver and I Were Young (1956), went through two printings, and she published over 100 poems. She was posthumously inducted into the Colorado Women's Hall of Fame in 1989.

== Early life and education ==
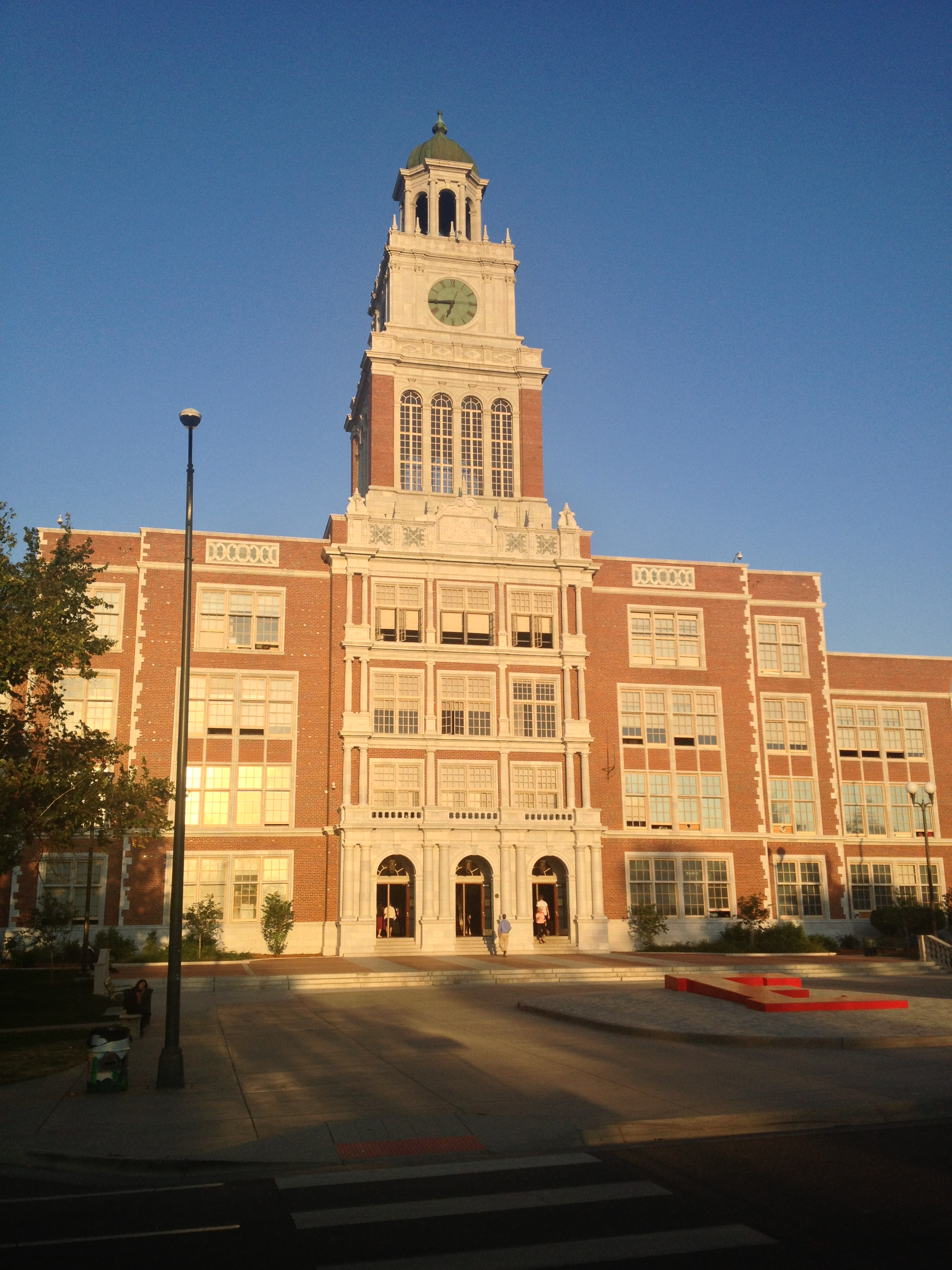
East High School, Denver

Edwina Hume Fallis was born in Denver, Colorado and grew up in a house at the corner of West 14th and Acoma Streets, which is now the site of the Denver Public Library. Her mother's father, Daniel Hurd, was president of the Denver school board. Fallis studied in the Denver public school system and graduated from East High School in 1895. She spoke at the graduation ceremony on "Ideas Stronger Than Armies", discussing "great historical ideas".

She went on to graduate from the Colorado State College of Education. She also studied at the University of Denver and Columbia University, and took advanced courses in teaching in Chicago. She took her first job as an assistant kindergarten teacher in Denver. During story hour, she found she was able to hold the children's attention if the group was small, but if the group was big, her job was harder. She started creating toys and props to help her students follow the plots of classic stories such as "Three Billy Goats Gruff", "Goldilocks and the Three Bears", "Chicken Little", and "The Three Little Pigs". When she noticed that the children were using the toys to create scripts of their own, she created animal figurines and "wagons, automobiles, trains, [and] airplanes", producing about 80 figurines applicable to more than two dozen children's stories.

In the late 1930s, Edwina and her sister Bella, who designed the figurines, opened the Fallis Toy Shop in Denver. Seeing the prohibitive cost of manufacturing toys, Edwina wrote a book, The Child and Things (1940), which reproduced images of the toys, and sent a copy to the Association for Childhood Education convention in Milwaukee. The book was seen by a toy manufacturer who arranged for the Judy Company of Minneapolis to manufacture the figurines and send royalty checks to the Fallis Toy Shop.

== Writer and poet ==
A hat was a nuisance. It was always falling off unless there was a rubber under your chin.... Speaking of hats, they constituted another "don't" at school. Never wear or try on another child's hat. Why? You might bring home something you didn't like.

–When Denver and I Were Young

During her 42 years as a kindergarten teacher, Fallis wrote textbooks and articles for teachers. Following her retirement, she penned stories for Child Life magazine and published over 100 poems, many of which appeared in anthologies. During her convalescence from a heart attack, she began writing When Denver and I Were Young (1956), a colorful memoir for children about growing up in Denver between 1876 and 1890. She described such sights as horse-drawn vehicles and the gravity streetcar, school life, and family life such as home canning and "patching their clothes until they wore too thin even for patches". She also described meeting Baby Doe Tabor outside a store. The book sold out its first printing and went into a second.

== Other activities ==
Fallis was president of the Denver Woman's Press Club and a board member of the Fox Street Community Center.

== Honors and awards ==
She was posthumously inducted into the Colorado Women's Hall of Fame in 1989 and the East High Hall of Fame in 2010.

== Personal life ==
Fallis died at the age of 80 in Denver and was buried in the Riverside Cemetery.

In 1961, the Denver school district named the Edwina Hume Fallis Elementary School in her honor.

== Selected bibliography ==
- When Denver and I Were Young. Big Mountain Press. 1956.
- The Child and Things. World Book Company. 1940.
