= Melvin School =

- U.S. National Register of Historic Places
- U.S. Historic district
- Colorado State Register of Historic Properties
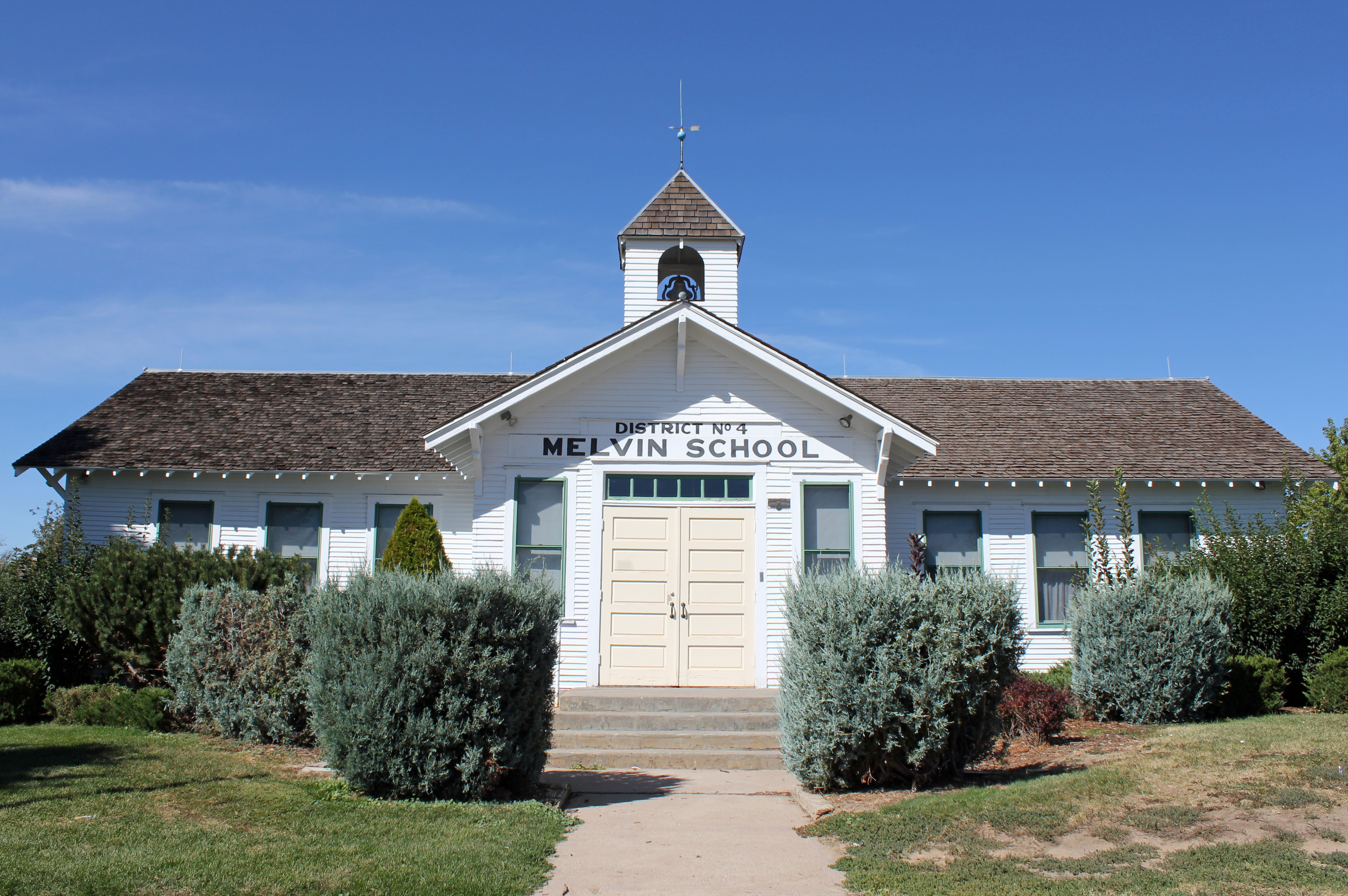

- Location within Colorado Location within the United States
- Location: 4950 S. Laredo St., Aurora, Colorado
- Coordinates: 39°37′36″N 104°48′13″W
- Area: 0.4 acres (0.16 ha)
- MPS: Rural School Buildings in Colorado MPS
- NRHP reference No.: 84000790
- CSRHP No.: 5AH.164
- Added to NRHP: January 5, 1984

The Melvin School is a former homestead located at 4950 S. Laredo St. in Aurora, Colorado. It was moved to its current site from its original location, 3 miles away. It was built in 1922.

The structure has undergone extensive renovation, including a rebuilding of the belfry, which was done using old pictures as a guide. Inside the structure, there is a museum and library in one room and an authentically-restored classroom that shows the interior of a typical rural school from the 1920s.

== See also ==
- National Register of Historic Places listings in Arapahoe County, Colorado
