= Comanche Crossing of the Kansas Pacific Railroad =

- U.S. National Register of Historic Places
- U.S. Historic district
- Colorado State Register of Historic Properties
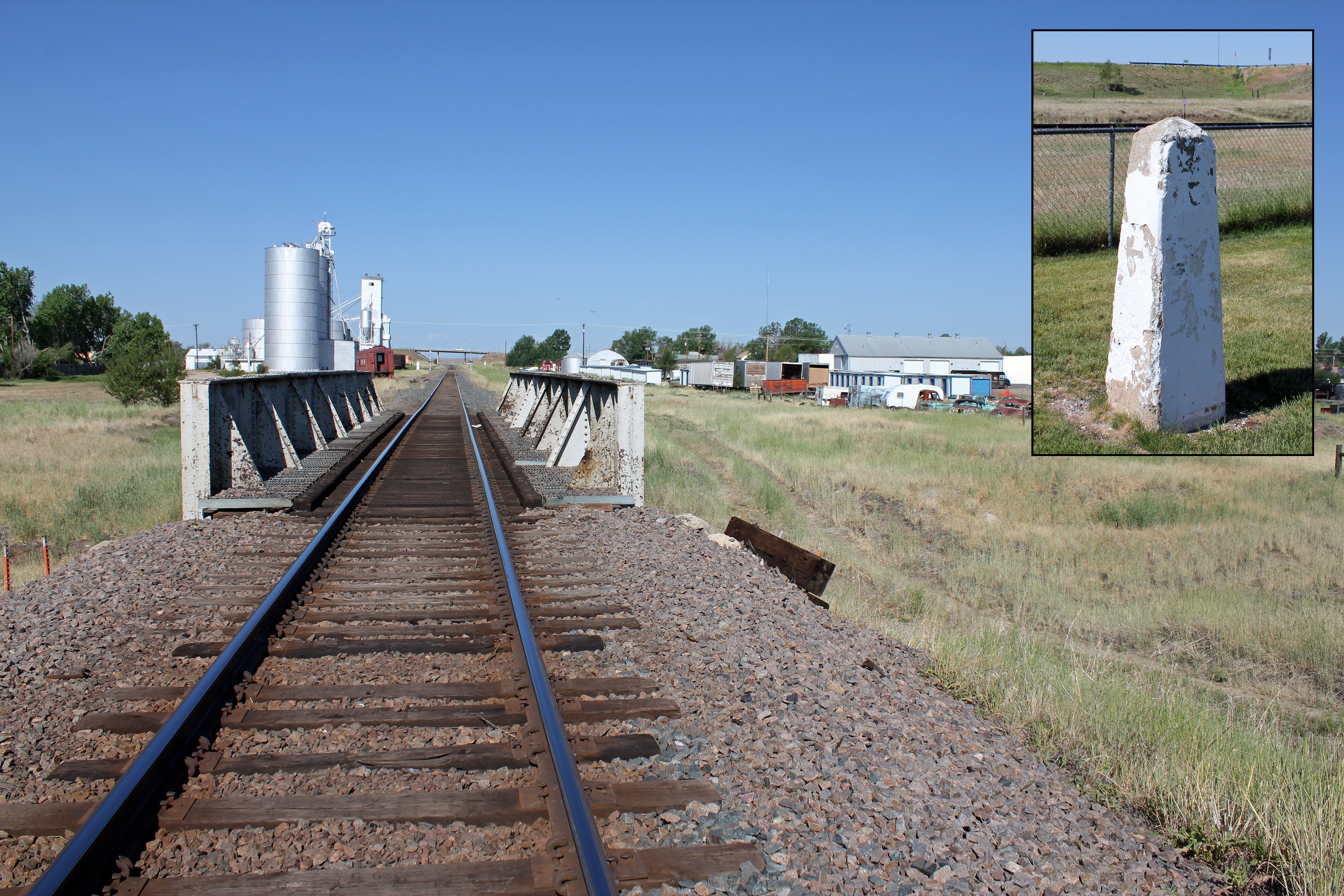
- The railroad bridge that goes over Comanche Creek in Strasburg, Colorado. The inset shows a small monument in Strasburg's Lyons Park, located a few hundred feet from the creek, near the viaduct in the distance in the photo.

- Location within Colorado Location within the United States
- Nearest city: Strasburg, Colorado
- Coordinates: 39°44′15″N 104°18′29″W
- Area: 9.9 acres (4.0 ha)
- NRHP reference No.: 70000152
- CSRHP No.: 5AH.163
- Added to NRHP: August 10, 1970

The Comanche Crossing of the Kansas Pacific Railroad is a site where the last spike was driven into the first continuous transcontinental railroad on August 15, 1870. The site is east of Strasburg, Colorado, near railroad mile marker 602. A monument commemorating the event is located at Lyons Park in Strasburg.

== History ==
On May 10, 1869, Union Pacific Railroad and Central Pacific Railroad was connected at Promontory, Utah, providing railroad transportation between Omaha, Nebraska and Sacramento, California. There was not true, unbroken transcontinental railroad service to ports on the Atlantic and Pacific Coasts until the September 6, 1869 connection to Alameda terminal on the shores of San Francisco Bay and this August 15, 1870, "joining of the rails" of the Kansas Pacific Railroad near the crossing at Comanche Crossing in Colorado. The Union Pacific-Central Pacific line from the West coast was thus linked to the east side of the Missouri River at Kansas City, which was then connected by rail network to the East coast. It remained the only all-rail route across the country until March 22, 1872, when the Union Pacific finished the railroad bridge across the Missouri River at Omaha.

It was listed on the National Register of Historic Places in 1970 and it is part of a multiple property submission, Railroads in Colorado, 1858-1948 for the National Register of Historic Places.

== See also ==
- National Register of Historic Places listings in Arapahoe County, Colorado
