= Knight-Wood House =

- U.S. National Register of Historic Places
- U.S. Historic district
- Colorado State Register of Historic Properties
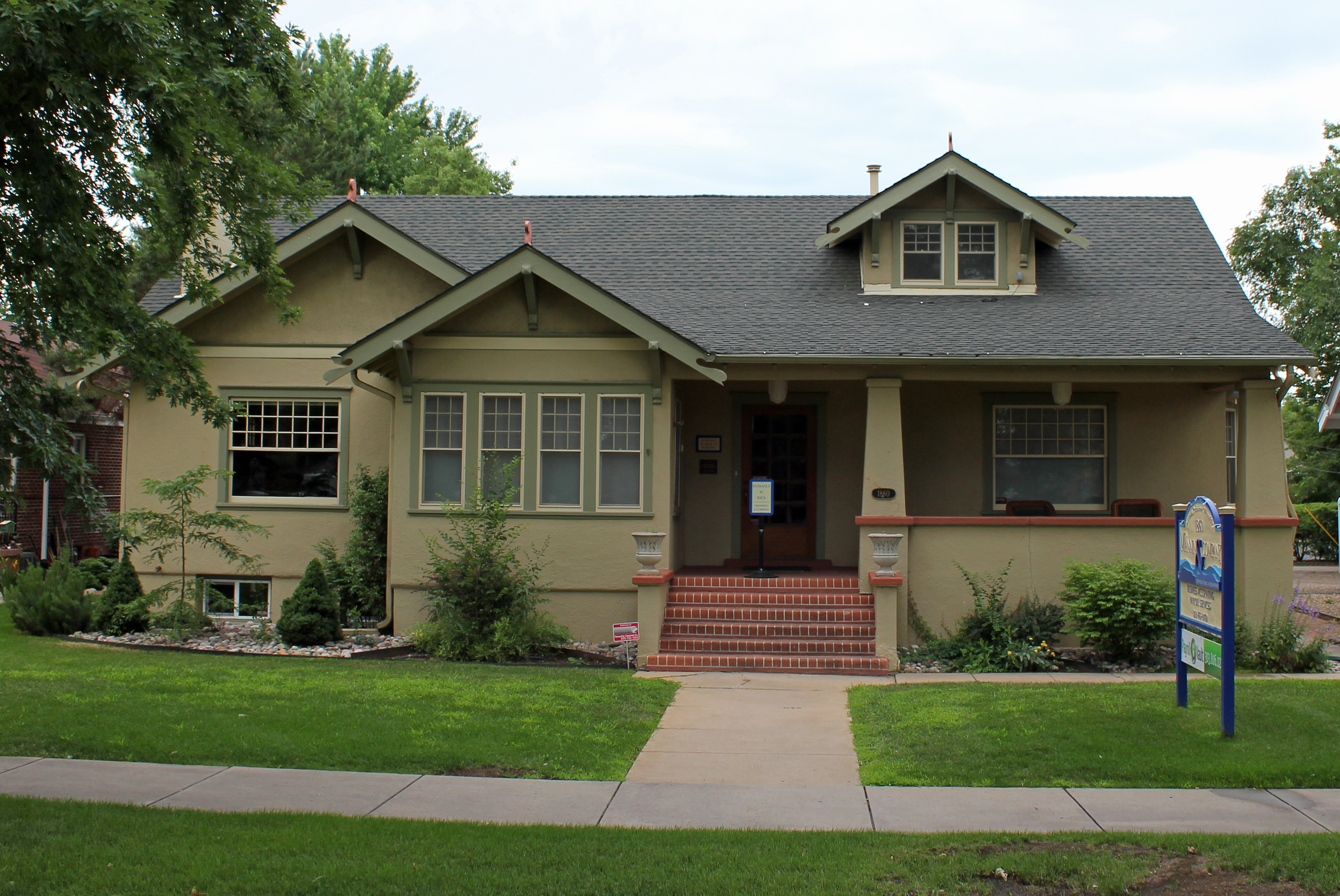

- Location within Colorado Location within the United States
- Location: 1860 W. Littleton Blvd., Littleton, Colorado
- Coordinates: 39°36′47″N 105°0′34″W
- Area: less than one acre
- Architectural style: Craftsman
- NRHP reference No.: 04001111
- CSRHP No.: 5AH.1985
- Added to NRHP: October 6, 2004

The Knight-Wood Home is a home located at 1800 West Littleton Blvd in Littleton, Colorado. It is a one and half story house built in 1925. It was listed on the National Register of Historic Places in 2004.

It was deemed notable as a fine example of a Craftsman-style house, having all five of the identifying features of the type: low-pitched, gabled roofs; "wide, unenclosed eave overhangs; decorative beams or braces under the gables; full or partial porches with roofs supported by square tapered columns; and columns or pedestals that extend to the ground level without a break at the porch level."

A second contributing building in the listing is the original garage.

== See also ==
- National Register of Historic Places listings in Arapahoe County, Colorado
