= Little Estate =

- U.S. National Register of Historic Places
- U.S. Historic district
- Colorado State Register of Historic Properties
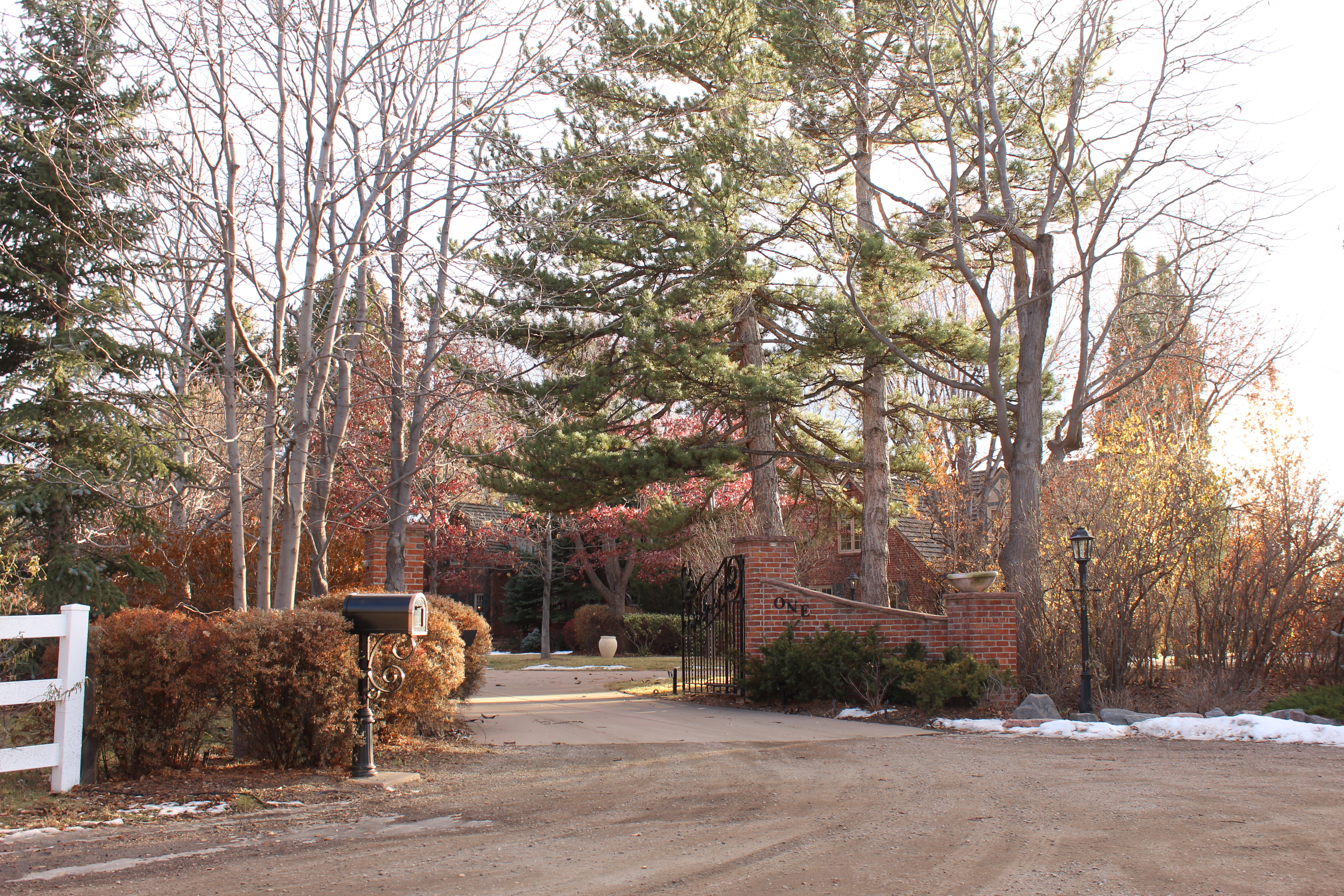

- Location within Colorado Location within the United States
- Location: 1 Littleridge Ln., Cherry Hills Village, Arapahoe County, Colorado
- Coordinates: 39°38′58″N 104°58′10″W
- Area: 2.5 acres (1.0 ha)
- Architect: Gordon Jamieson and Ewing Stiffler
- Architectural style: Late 19th and 20th Century Revival: Tudor Revival
- NRHP reference No.: 98000610
- CSRHP No.: 5AH.1432
- Added to NRHP: May 29, 1998

The Little Estate is a mansion home located at 1 Littleridge Ln. in Cherry Hills Village, Colorado. It was built in 1941 in Tudor Revival style. The property has a pool, mature trees, and landscaping.

The house is a two-story gabled brick building, with main part about 31 by 65 feet (9.4 m × 19.8 m) in plan, and with a one-story wing about 27 by 60 feet (8.2 m × 18.3 m) in plan. Its exterior walls, set upon a concrete foundation, are finished with brick laid in common bond.

== See also ==
- National Register of Historic Places listings in Arapahoe County, Colorado
