= George H. Williamson =

American architect

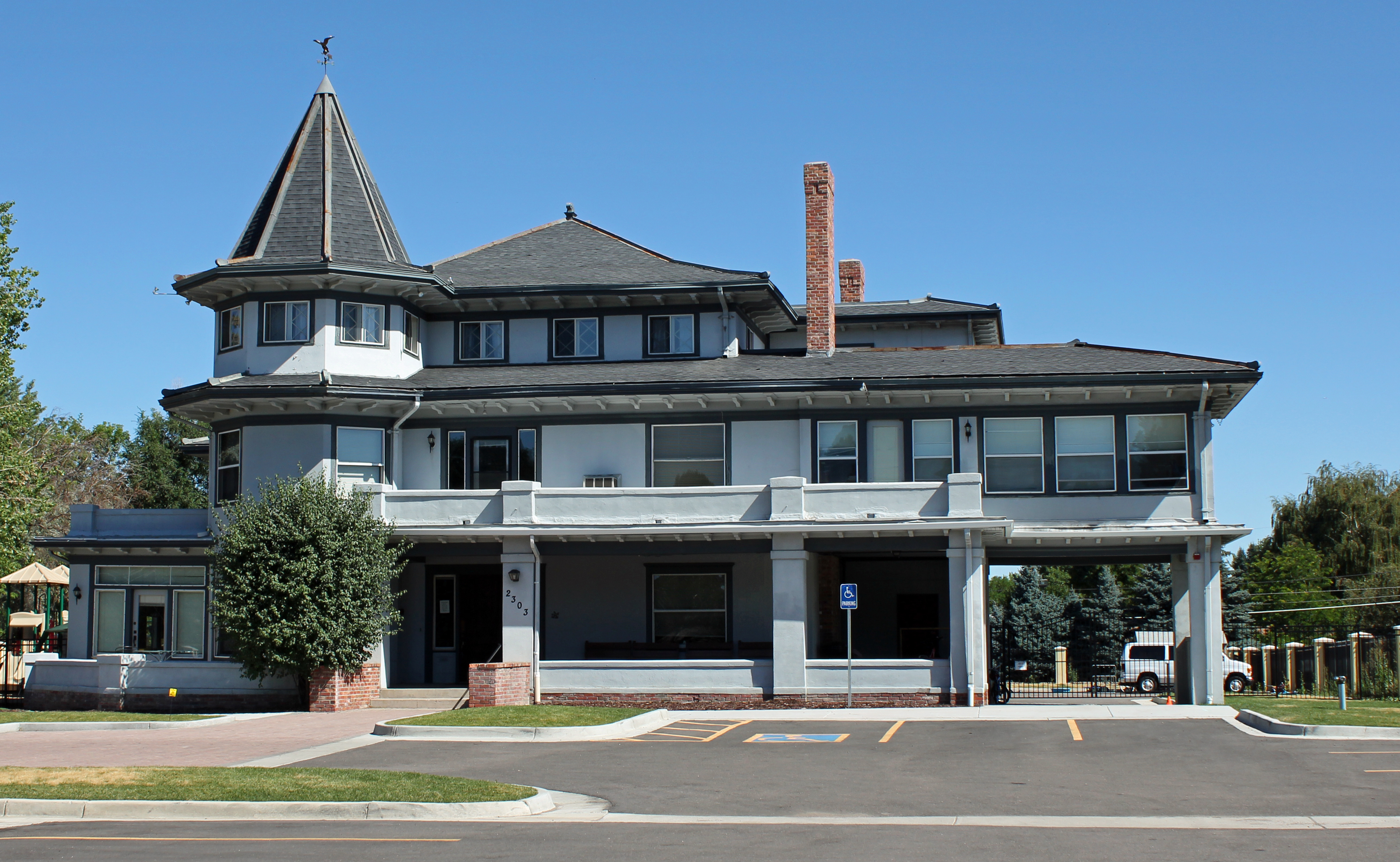
David W. Brown House

George Hebard Williamson (August 15, 1872, Brighton, Colorado – October 10, 1936, Denver) was an American architect.

A number of his works are listed on the National Register of Historic Places.

Works include:

- David W. Brown House, 2303 E. Dartmouth Ave., Englewood, Colorado (Williamson, George H.), NRHP-listed
- East High School, 1545 Detroit St., Denver, Colorado (Williamson, George Hebard), NRHP-listed
