= Curtis School (Greenwood Village, Colorado) =

- U.S. National Register of Historic Places
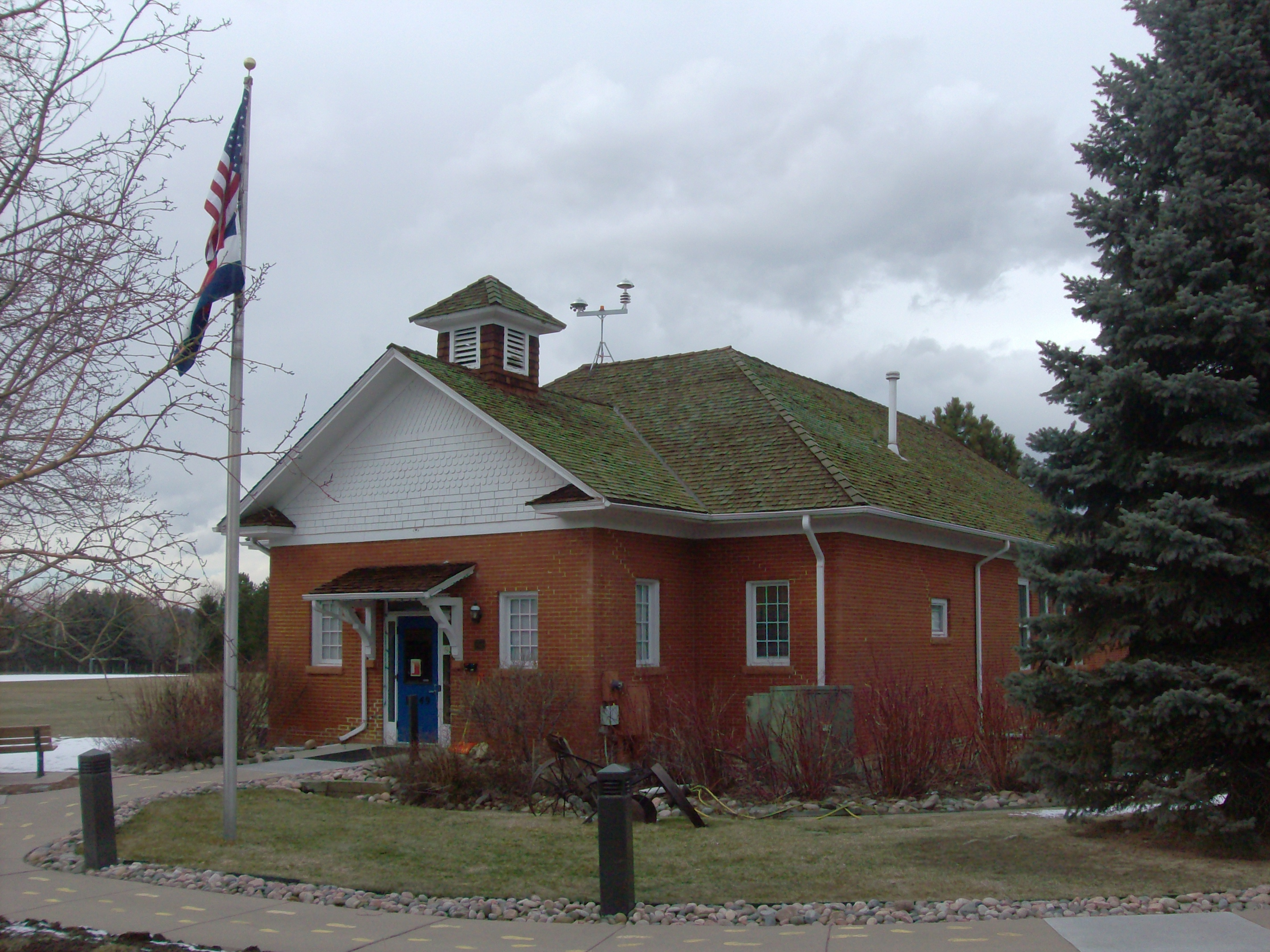
- Location: 2349 E. Orchard Rd., Greenwood Village, Colorado
- Coordinates: 39°36′37″N 104°57′37″W
- Area: 0.4 acres (0.16 ha)
- Built: 1914
- MPS: Rural School Buildings in Colorado MPS
- NRHP reference No.: 92000808
- Added to NRHP: June 25, 1992

The Curtis School at 2349 E. Orchard Rd. in Greenwood Village, Colorado was built in 1914. It was listed on the National Register of Historic Places in 1992. It served as a school and as a meeting hall.

It is a one-story red brick schoolhouse with a central bell tower, and is the oldest public building in Greenwood Village.

The building was moved about 300 feet (91 m) west to its current location in 1987, and it was then renovated for use as a "community art and history center".
