= Strasburg, Colorado =

Census-designated place in Colorado, USA

- CDP
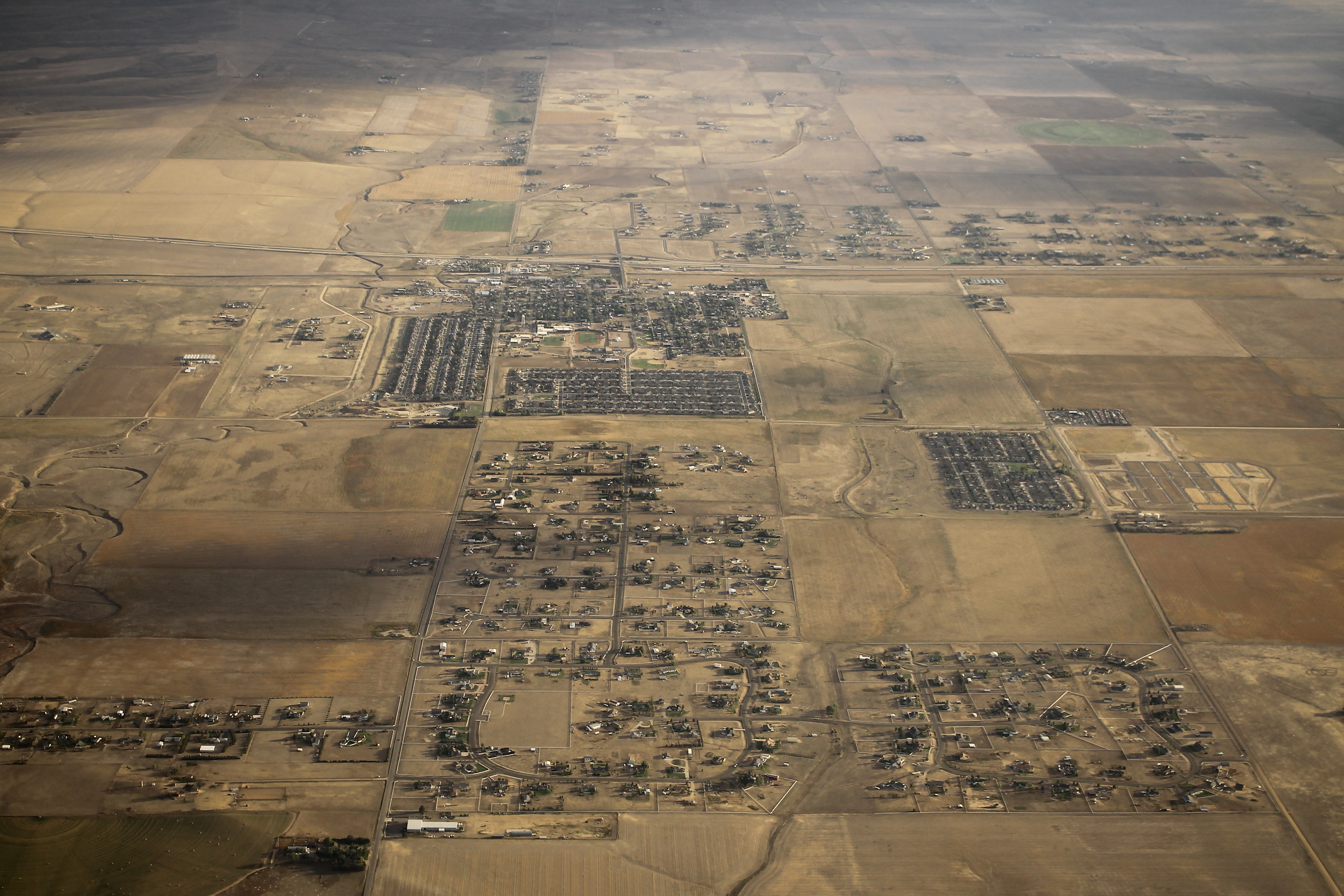
- Aerial photo of Strasburg
- Interactive map of Strasburg, Colorado
- Location within Colorado
- Coordinates: 39.7207°N 104.3182°W
- Country: United States
- State: Colorado
- Counties: Adams, Arapahoe

Government
  - Type: unincorporated town

Area
  - Total: 20.827 sq mi (53.942 km^{2})
  - Land: 20.802 sq mi (53.876 km^{2})
  - Water: 0.025 sq mi (0.064 km^{2}) 0.12%
- Elevation: 5,410 ft (1,650 m)

Population (2020)
  - Total: 3,307
  - Estimate (2025): 3,372
  - Density: 159.0/sq mi (61.38/km^{2})
- Time zone: UTC–7 (Mountain (MST))
  - Summer (DST): UTC–6 (MDT)
- ZIP Code: 80136
- Area codes: 303, 720, and 983
- FIPS code: 08-74375
- GNIS feature ID: 2410008
- Highway: I-70

Strasburg is an unincorporated town located east of downtown Denver along the I-70 corridor. It is home to Strasburg School District 31-J, and there are several small businesses, medical clinics, and a post office. Strasburg is a Census-designated place (CDP) located in and governed by Adams and Arapahoe Counties, Colorado, United States. The population was 3,307 as of the 2020 census, and was estimated at 3,372 in 2025. Mailing addresses in the town are assigned the ZIP Code 80136.

The CDP is a part of the Denver–Aurora–Lakewood, CO Metropolitan Statistical Area.

== History ==
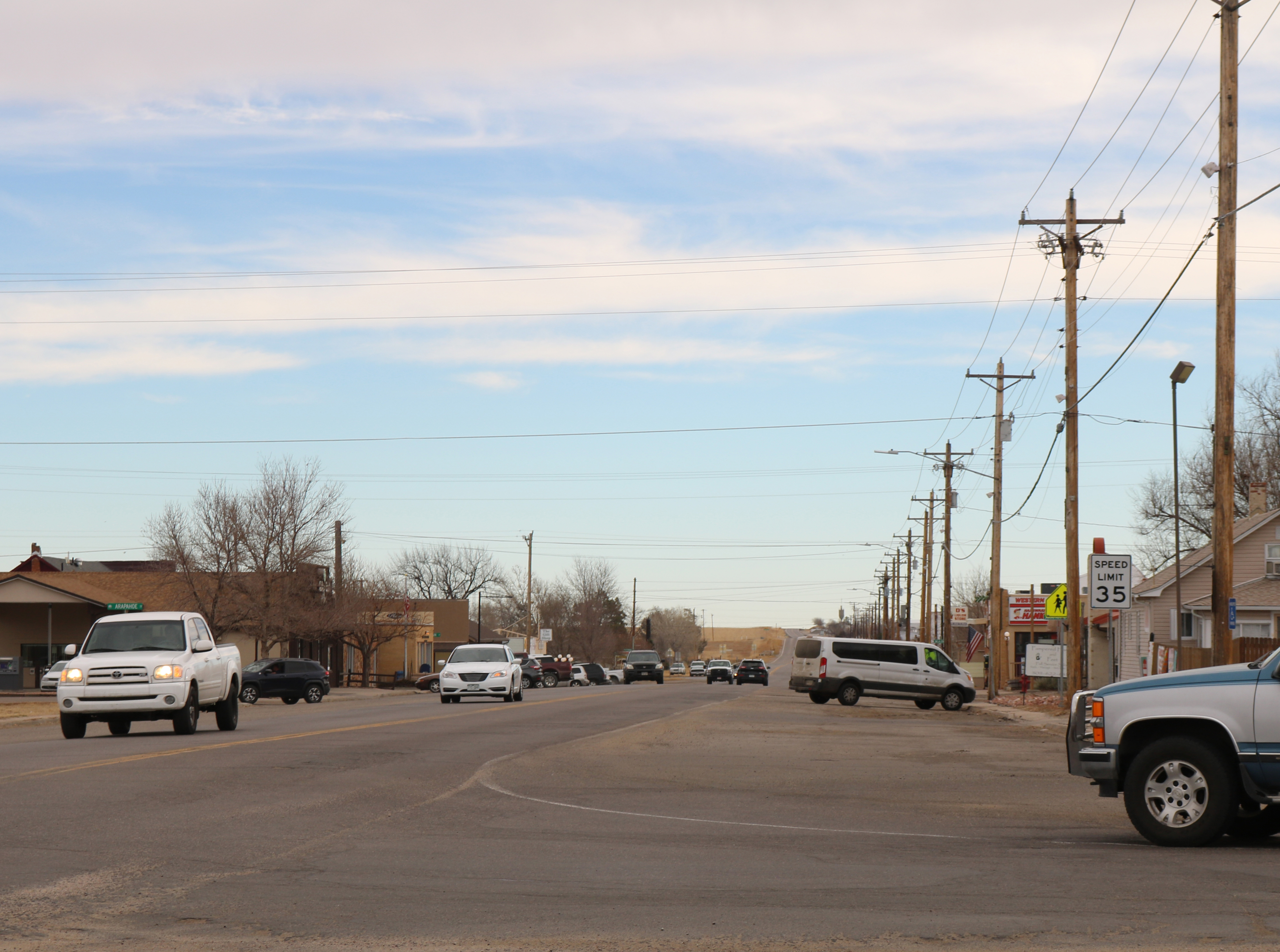
Strasburg, looking east along 15th Avenue.

The community was named after John Strasburg, a railroad official. Strasburg may now be considered a commuter community as new housing continues to be built and much of the populace works in the surrounding areas of Aurora, Brighton, and Denver.

The town is built next to the Comanche Crossing of the Kansas Pacific Railroad. A post office called Strasburg has been in operation since 1908.

On January 27, 2001, a plane carrying two Oklahoma State Cowboys basketball team players and six broadcasters and coaching staff crashed near Strasburg. All 10 people on board died.

== Geography ==
According to the United States Census Bureau, the CDP has an area of 20.827 square miles (53.94 km^{2}), of which 20.802 square miles (53.88 km^{2}) is land and 0.025 square miles (0.06 km^{2}) (0.12%) is water.

== Demographics ==
Historical population
Census	Pop.	Note	%±
2000	1,402		—
2010	2,447		74.5%
2020	3,307		35.1%
2025 (est.)	3,372		2.0%
U.S. Decennial Census; 2020 Census

According to realtor website Zillow, the average price of a home as of October 31, 2026, in Strasburg was $522,769.

As of the 2024 American Community Survey, there were 1,114 estimated households in Strasburg with an average of 3.10 persons per household. The CDP has a median household income of $117,845. Approximately 13.6% of the city's population lives at or below the poverty line. Strasburg has an estimated 56.2% employment rate, with 18.1% of the population holding a bachelor's degree or higher and 93.2% holding a high school diploma. There were 1,114 housing units at an average density of 53.55 per square mile (20.68/km^{2}).

The top five reported languages (people were allowed to report up to two languages, thus the figures will generally add to more than 100%) were English (87.4%), Spanish (12.6%), Indo-European (0.0%), Asian and Pacific Islander (0.0%), and Other (0.0%).

The median age in the CDP was 37.1 years.

Strasburg, Colorado – racial and ethnic composition Note: the US Census treats Hispanic/Latino as an ethnic category. This table excludes Latinos from the racial categories and assigns them to a separate category. Hispanics/Latinos may be of any race.
Race / ethnicity (NH = non-Hispanic)	Pop. 2000	Pop. 2010	Pop. 2020	% 2000	% 2010	% 2020
White alone (NH)	1,313	2,201	2,485	93.65%	89.95%	75.14%
Black or African American alone (NH)	17	16	36	1.21%	0.65%	1.09%
Native American or Alaska Native alone (NH)	7	18	21	0.50%	0.74%	0.64%
Asian alone (NH)	3	14	27	0.21%	0.57%	0.82%
Pacific Islander alone (NH)	1	0	2	0.07%	0.00%	0.06%
Other race alone (NH)	3	0	8	0.21%	0.00%	0.24%
Mixed race or multiracial (NH)	18	34	167	1.28%	1.39%	5.05%
Hispanic or Latino (any race)	40	164	561	2.85%	6.70%	16.96%
Total	1,402	2,447	3,307	100.00%	100.00%	100.00%

=== 2020 census ===
As of the 2020 census, there were 3,307 people, 1,166 households, and 863 families residing in the CDP. The population density was 158.95 inhabitants per square mile (61.37/km^{2}). There were 1,227 housing units at an average density of 58.98 per square mile (22.77/km^{2}). The racial makeup of the CDP was 80.04% White, 1.24% African American, 1.03% Native American, 0.91% Asian, 0.06% Pacific Islander, 5.29% from some other races and 11.43% from two or more races. Hispanic or Latino people of any race were 16.96% of the population.

=== 2010 census ===
As of the 2010 census, there were 2,447 people, 921 households, and 665 families residing in the CDP. The population density was 117.67 inhabitants per square mile (45.43/km^{2}). There were 970 housing units at an average density of 46.64 per square mile (18.01/km^{2}). The racial makeup of the CDP was 93.58% White, 0.90% African American, 0.90% Native American, 0.57% Asian, 0.04% Pacific Islander, 2.04% from some other races and 1.96% from two or more races. Hispanic or Latino people of any race were 6.70% of the population.

=== 2000 census ===
As of the 2000 census, there were 1,402 people, 503 households, and 393 families residing in the CDP. The population density was 181.14 inhabitants per square mile (69.94/km^{2}). There were 532 housing units at an average density of 68.74 per square mile (26.54/km^{2}). The racial makeup of the CDP was 95.44% White, 1.28% African American, 0.57% Native American, 0.21% Asian, 0.07% Pacific Islander, 0.71% from some other races and 1.71% from two or more races. Hispanic or Latino people of any race were 2.85% of the population.

There were 503 households, out of which 39.8% had children under the age of 18 living with them, 68.0% were married couples living together, 7.2% had a female householder with no husband present, and 21.7% were non-families. 18.1% of all households were made up of individuals, and 7.6% had someone living alone who was 65 years of age or older. The average household size was 2.76 and the average family size was 3.14.

In the CDP, the population was spread out, with 29.7% under the age of 18, 5.7% from 18 to 24, 29.2% from 25 to 44, 25.0% from 45 to 64, and 10.4% who were 65 years of age or older. The median age was 36 years. For every 100 females, there were 100.0 males. For every 100 females age 18 and over, there were 93.7 males.

The median income for a household in the CDP was $53,558, and the median income for a family was $61,157. Males had a median income of $42,097 versus $25,862 for females. The per capita income for the CDP was $19,546. About 3.1% of families and 6.4% of the population were below the poverty line, including 6.7% of those under age 18 and 11.7% of those age 65 or over.

== Education ==
The Strasburg School District 31J serves Strasburg.
