= Harlon L. Dalton =

Harlon Dalton is Professor of Law at Yale Law School and an ordained minister in the Episcopal church.

Professor Dalton, a progressive liberal, received his A.B. from Harvard and his J.D. from Yale. The main focus of Dalton's career has been on the interplays between law, theology, and psychology. He is particularly interested in race issues and civil liberties. In his 1995 book of essays, Racial Healing, Dalton argues that there is still much that needs to be done to eliminate racial friction and make for a truly equal society. He touches on more than just race, declaring that the possibilities for discrimination in our society are mainly due to larger underlying problems with our capitalistic society.

In June 2007, Dalton accompanied the Beatitudes Society to Camp Coast Care to work on rebuilding homes devastated by Hurricane Katrina.
