= Merrill H. Hoyt =

American architect (1881–1933)

Merrill Hubert Hoyt (18 May 1881 Denver – 11 February 1933 Denver) was a prominent American architect, business man and leader in the building design community of Denver, Colorado from 1910 to 1933.

== Early years 1881 - 1899 ==
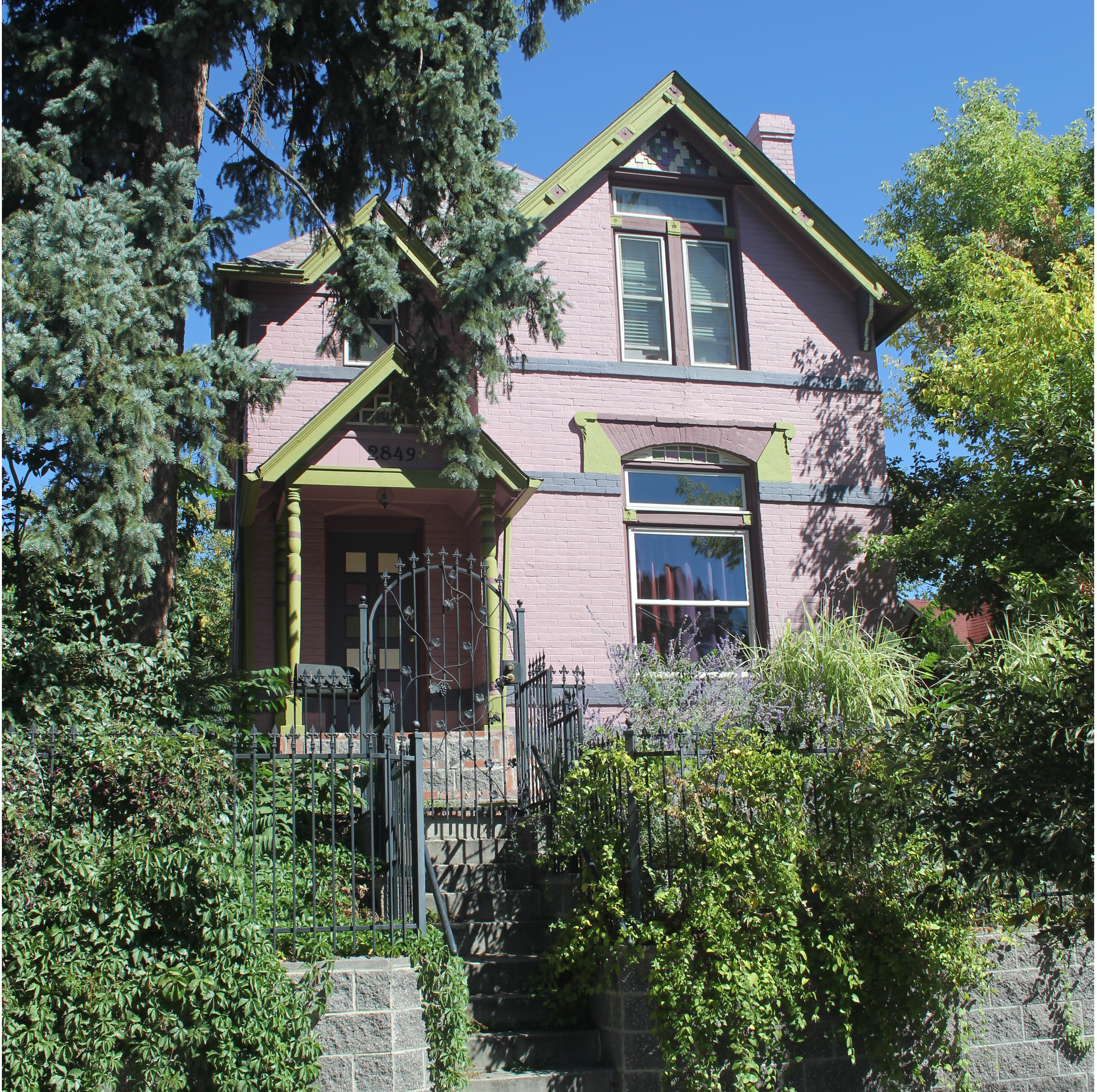
The Hoyt Residence located at 2849 West 23rd Avenue Denver, Colorado was the family home of Merrill and Burnham Hoyt.

Born in North Denver on May 18, 1881, Merrill H. Hoyt grew up in the house located at 2849 West 23rd Avenue Denver. He was the eldest son of Lydia Tompkins Hoyt and Wallace Hoyt, a carriage designer who emigrated from New Brunswick, Canada. He is the eldest brother of Architect Burnham F. Hoyt. As a boy, Merrill earned money delivering newspapers and working in the fields of local farms. After graduating from Denver's North High School, he decided to train for a career in architecture.

== Later years 1899 - 1933 ==
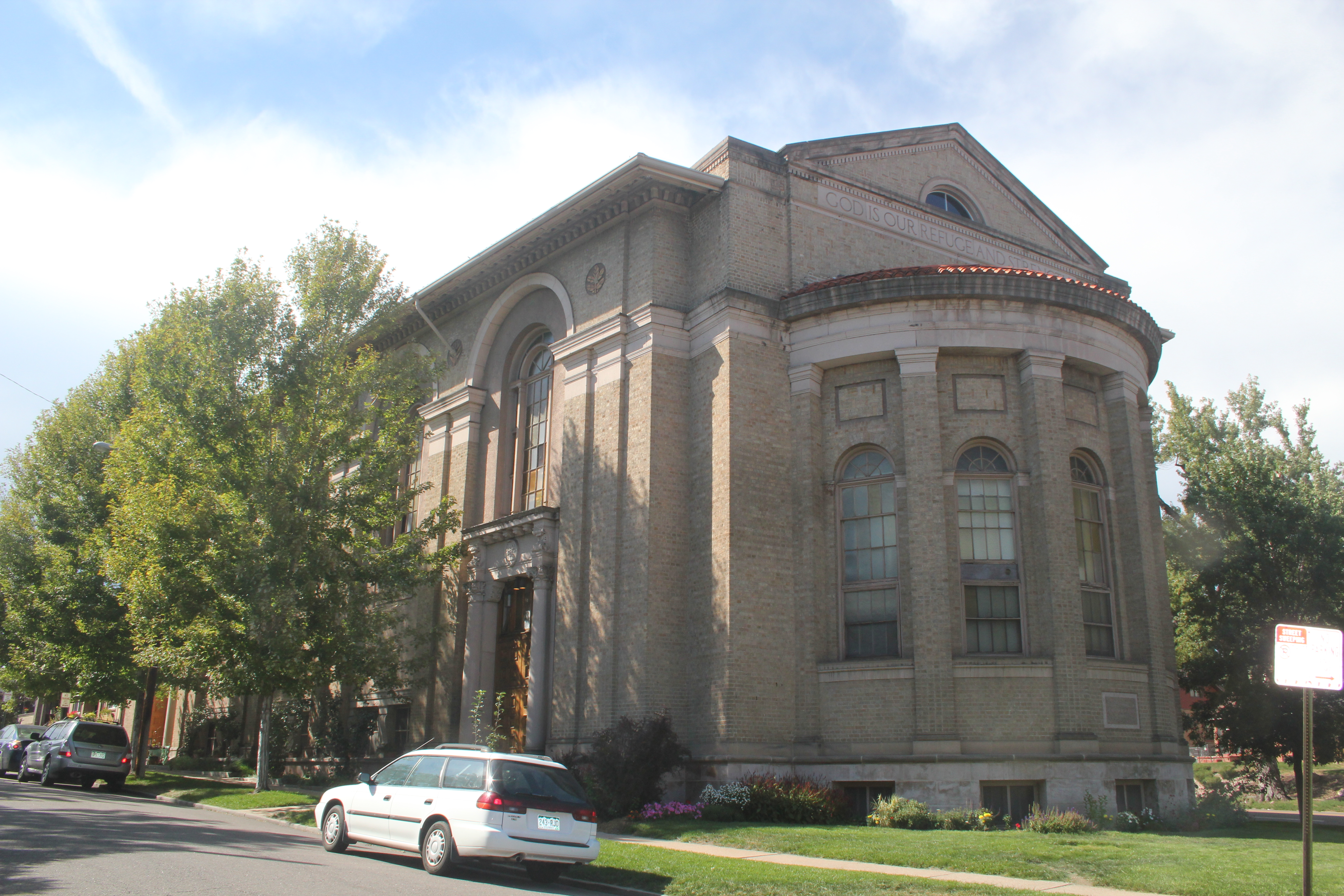
The Fourth Church of Christ Scientist Denver, CO built in 1920 was designed by Merrill H. and Burnham F. Hoyt.

In 1899, he was hired by the prestigious firm of William Fisher, Architect where he learned the trade as a draftsman at first and later as a superintendent . On October 4, 1907, he married Ethel Fowler in Silver Bow, Montana. The couple and daughter Grace lived in his boyhood neighborhood at 2509 West 36th Avenue. In 1915, he started his own architectural practice, which later became M.H. and B. Hoyt, Architects when his brother Burnham joined the firm in 1919. The firm prospered in the 1920s and is credited with the design of many of Denver's iconic buildings of the era. Their designs embraced various historical styles including Greek revival, Romanesque and Spanish revival. Together they designed residential, commercial, academic and religious buildings. On February 11, 1933, Architect Merrill H. Hoyt suffered a sudden heart attack at a dinner party and died at age 52.

== Civic and professional engagement ==
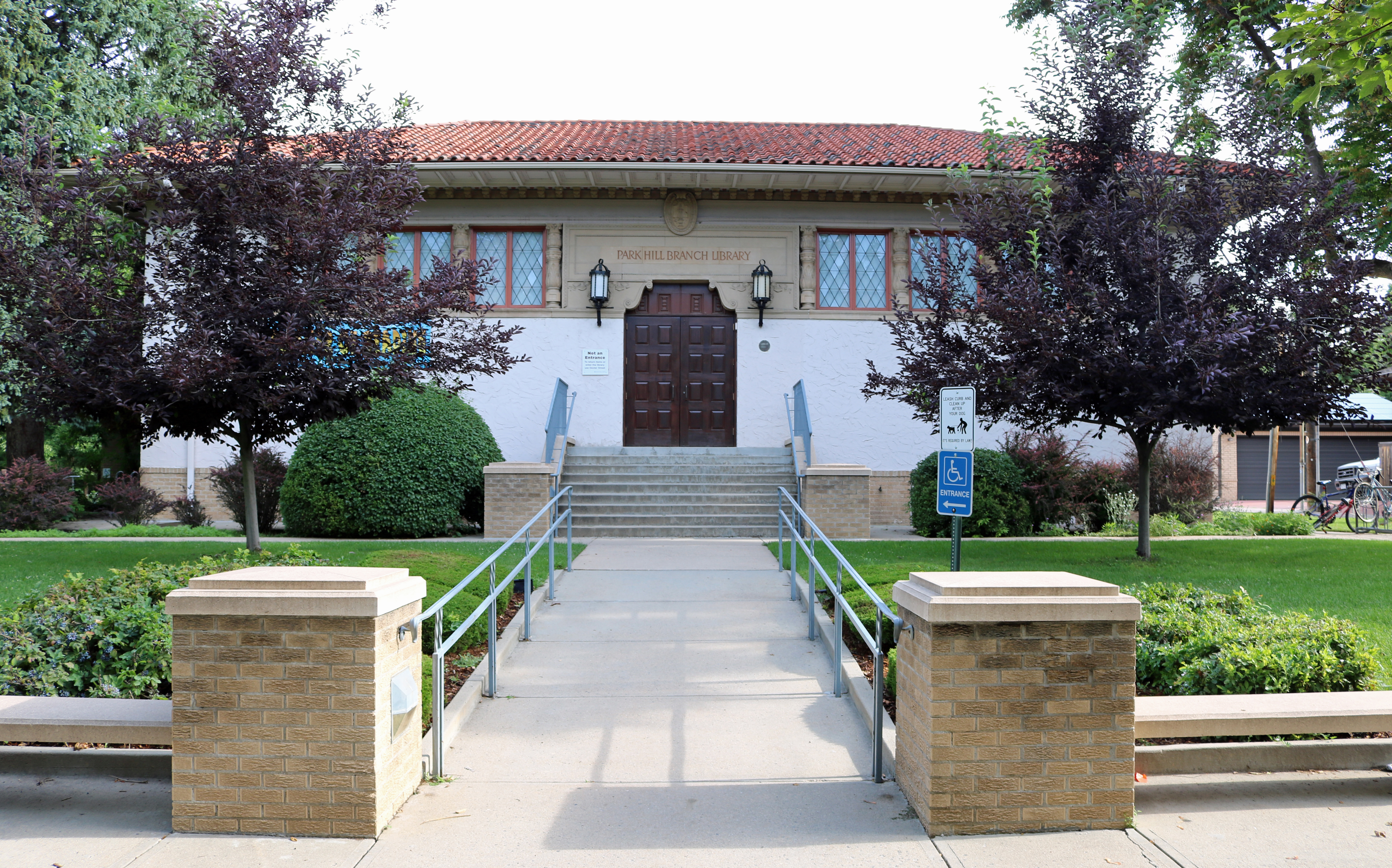
Denver Public Library - Park Hill Branch (1920) was designed by Merrill H. and Burnham F. Hoyt and is designated a Denver Landmark.

Merrill H Hoyt was an active and respected member of Denver design, business and cultural community. He served as a President and vice president of the Colorado Chapter of the American Institute of Architects, the secretary of the Allied Architects Association who designed the City and County Building of Denver, and vice president of the Denver Building and Loan Association. He was active in his Masonic Lodge, the Denver Art Museum, Motor Club of Colorado, Issac Walton League, Lakewood Country Club and a member of the Denver Athletic Club.

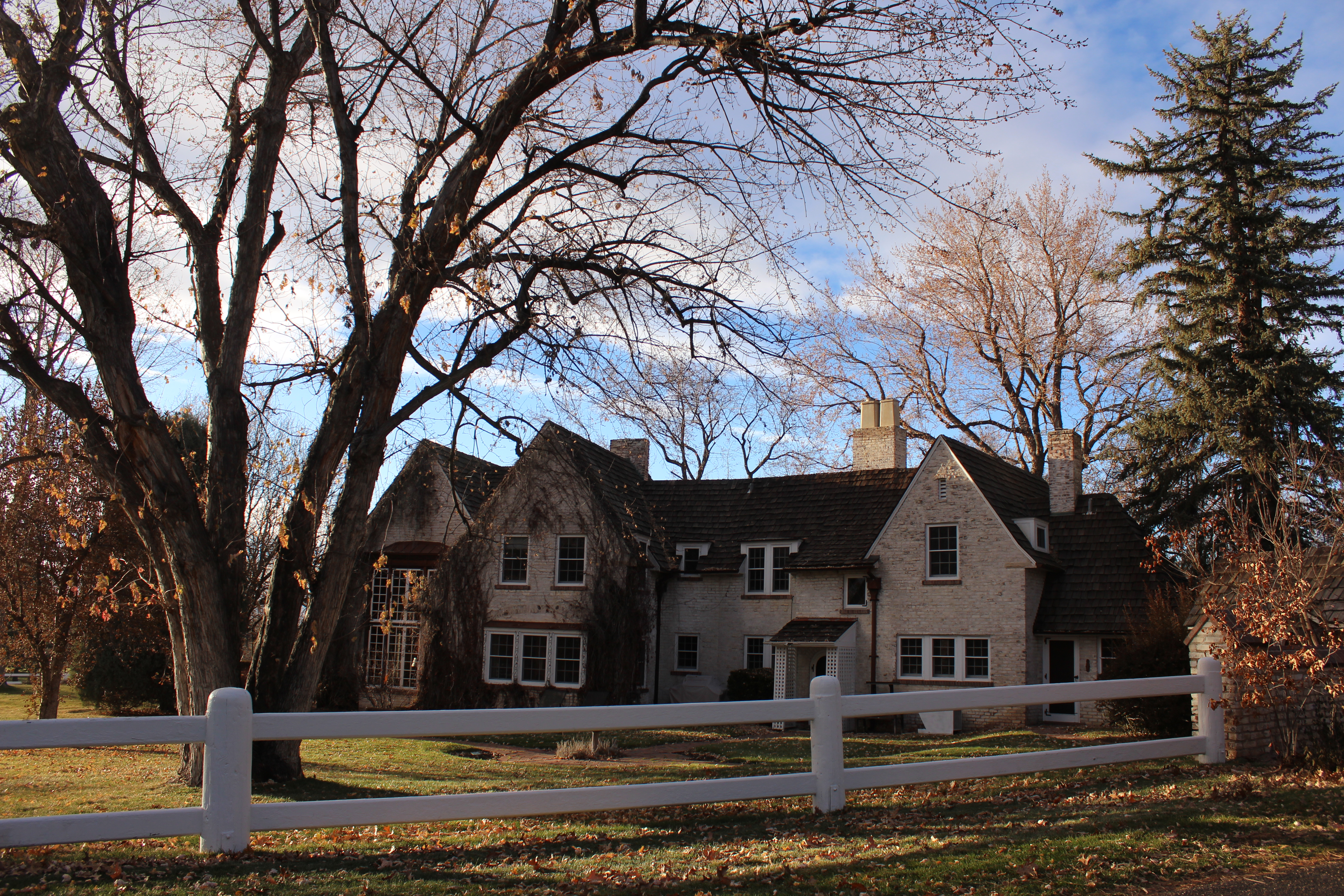
The Owen Estate (1923) located at 3901 S. Gilpin St., Denver CO is listed on the National Register of Historic Places.

== Credited buildings (partial list) ==
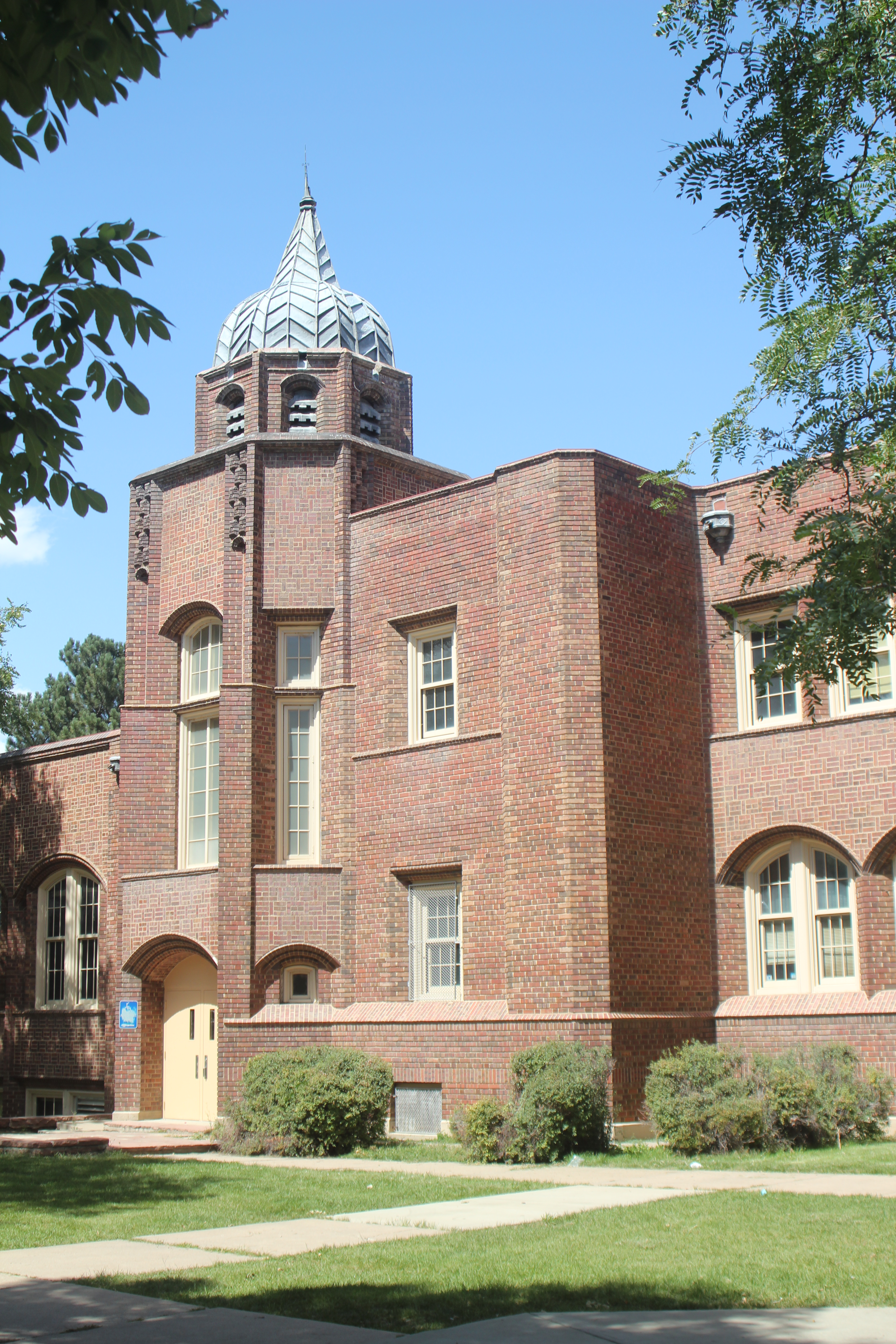
Lake Junior High Denver, CO (1926) designed by Merrill H. and Burnham F. Hoyt. It is currently the home of Lake International School.

- The Delta National Bank (1910) is located at 360 Main St., Delta, CO. It is thought to be one of the earliest building attributed to the architect. It was built 5 years before officially starting his own firm. It now serves as Delta Colorado's city hall and is on the Colorado State Register of Historical Places.
- Douglass Undertaking Building Facade(1915) located at 2745 Welton St. Denver, CO. This building is included in Denver's Five Points Historic Cultural District.
- Fourth Church of Christ Scientist (1920) located at 3101 W. 31st Ave. Denver, CO was designed with his brother Burnham F. Hoyt.
- Denver Public Library - Park Hill Branch (1920) located at 4705 Montview Blvd., Denver, CO was designed with his brother Burnham F. Hoyt. This building is designated a Denver Landmark.
- Hendricks House (1922) is located at 457 Williams Street Denver, CO in Denver's Driving Park Historic District.
- The residence at 860 Gaylord St., Denver, (1923) is located in the Denver's Morgan's Subdivision Historic District.
- The Owen Estate (1923) located at 3901 S. Gilpin St., Denver, CO is listed on the National Register of Historic Places.
- Cherry Hills Country Club (1923) located at 4125 S University Blvd, Cherry Hills Village, CO was designed with his brother Burnham F. Hoyt.
- The Denver Press Club (1925) located at 1330 Glenarm Pl., Denver, CO was designed with his brother Burnham F. Hoyt. This building is designated a Denver Landmark.
- The Maitland Estate (1925) located at 9 Sunset Drive Cherry Hills Village, CO was designed with his brother Burnham F. Hoyt. This building is listed on the National Register of Historic Places.
- Lake Junior High School (1926) located at 1820 Lowell Blvd., Denver, CO was designed with his brother Burnham F. Hoyt. This building is designated a Denver Landmark and currently houses Lake International School.
- Montview Boulevard Presbyterian Church, Education Wing (1927) located at 1980 Dahlia St., Denver CO is listed on the National Register of Historic Places.
- St. Martin's Chapel at St. John's Episcopal Cathedral (1928) located at 1313 Clarkston St., Denver, CO was designed with his brother Burnham F. Hoyt. This building is listed on the National Register of Historic Places.
- Steele Elementary School (addition) (1929) located at 300 S. Marion Pkwy., Denver, CO. This building is designated a Denver Landmark.
