= North High School (Colorado) =

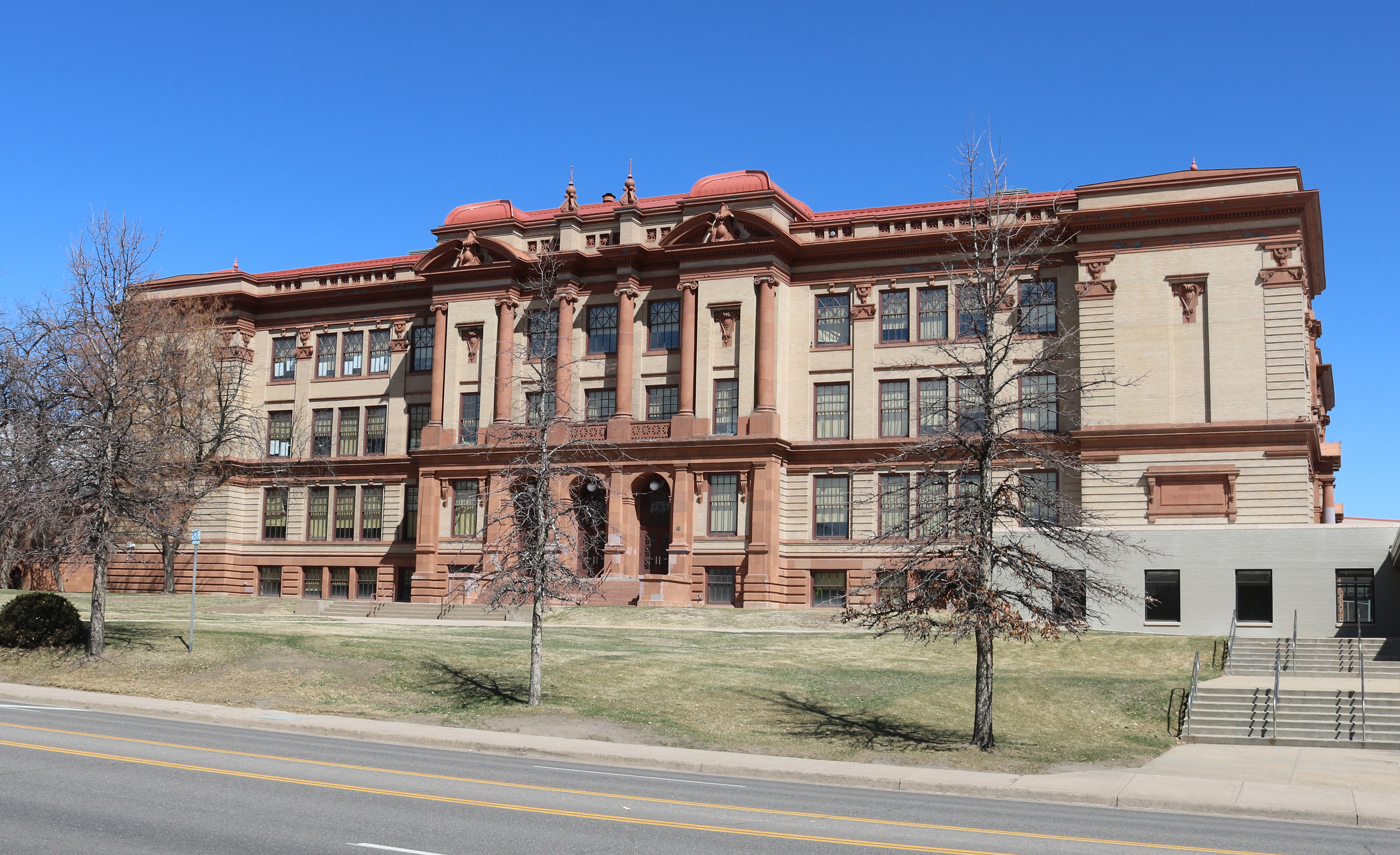
- The school in 2023

Location
- 2960 N. Speer Blvd. Denver, Colorado 80211-3754; United States; 39°45′36″N 105°01′21″W

Information
- Type: Public
- Established: 1883 (143 years ago)
- School district: Denver Public Schools
- CEEB code: 060428
- Principal: German Echeverria
- Faculty: 95.27 (FTE)
- Grades: 9–12
- Enrollment: 1,653 (2024-2025)
- Student to teacher ratio: 17.35
- Colors: Purple and gold
- Athletics: 4A/5A
- Athletics conference: Denver Prep
- Mascot: Vikings
- Website: http://north.dpsk12.org

North High School is a historic public high school located in the Northside of Denver, Colorado, United States. The school is part of the Denver Public Schools system and has been in continuous operation since 1883. It is one of four original high schools in Denver; the other three are East, West, and South.

== History ==
The high school was constructed by the then-independent township of Highland, northwest of Denver, in 1883. It belonged to Denver Public Schools from the beginning and was known as 'Denver North Side High School'; the original graduating class of 1886 was entirely female. In 1896 Highland was incorporated into the city of Denver and the existing school became inadequate for the growing number of students; a new Beaux-Arts style building was constructed in 1911 which continues to serve as the core of the modern school.

In the latter part of the 20th century, North High School experienced a continual decline in attendance and student achievement. In 2012-13 the graduation rate was 56.7%, with a drop-out rate of 3.4% and attendance rates of 90%. In 2010 it received a $3.1 million grant from the federal government as part of a scheme to reinvigorate low-performing schools in the United States. In 2007 the school received a $17.1 million remodeling that restored the historic features of the 1911 building and updated the athletic buildings and infrastructure.

Following several changes in administration, North High School has seen a strong rebound in recent years, with sharp rises in student enrollment, attendance, and graduation rates.

On the sitcom Good Luck Charlie, it is the rival school of South High School, where Teddy goes to school, and where PJ graduated from, and has a barbarian for a mascot in the show. It is almost seen in the episode "Double Whammy".

== Demographics ==
As of the 2021–2022 school year, North High School has a total enrollment of 1,587 students in grades nine through twelve.

- Hispanic/Latino: 66.5%
- White: 20%
- African American/Black: 7.1%
- Multiple races: 2.7%
- American Indian: 1.9%
- Asian & Pacific Islander: 1.8%

== Athletics ==
The athletic teams of North High School are known as the Vikings. The school competes in multiple athletic divisions — the 3A Denver Prep division for football, and the 5A/4A/3A mixed Denver Prep division (composed mostly of DPS teams) for all other sports. As of 2021, the athletic director is Kevin Bendjy.

== Notable alumni ==
- Carl Blaurock, mountaineer and Colorado Mountain Club president
- Ben Bezoff, politician
- Bobby LeFebre, Colorado's current poet laureate, and the state's youngest and first poet laureate of color
- Virgil Jester, former MLB player (Boston Braves)
- Merrill H. Hoyt, prominent Denver architect, business man and leader
- Burnham Hoyt (class of 1904), prominent mid-20th century architect in Denver
- Pat Haggerty, NFL referee
- Golda Meir (1898-1978), Prime Minister of Israel, attended between 1913 and 1914
- Aaron Stark, mental health advocate
- Sherman Glenn Finesilver, judge

== Gallery ==
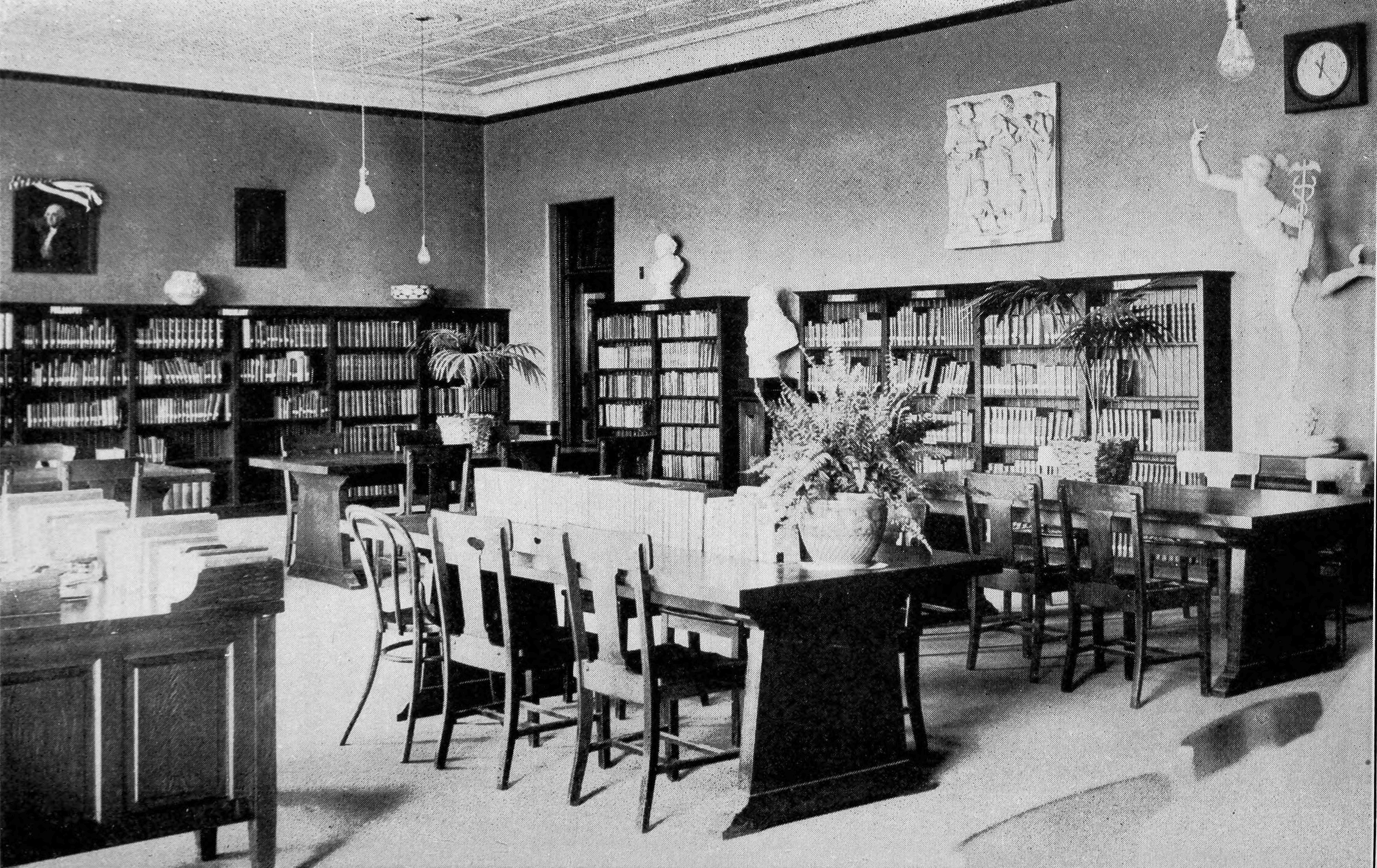
Library, 1918
