= Denver Press Club =

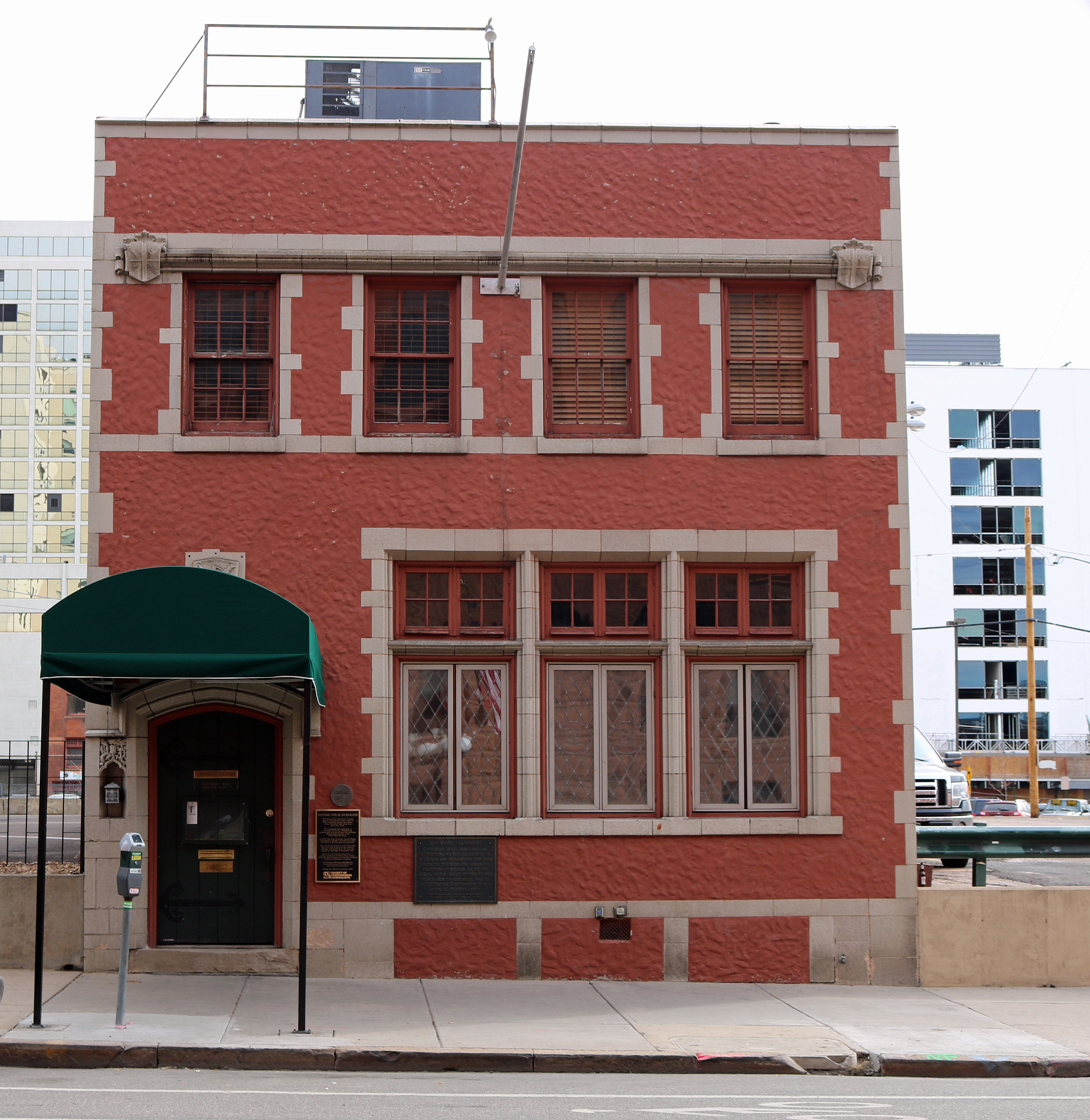
Denver Press Club.

The Denver Press Club, located at 1330 Glenarm Place, Denver, Colorado, is the oldest press club in the United States. Journalists first met in 1867, and the club was incorporated in 1877.

== History ==
Members first met in the basement of Wolfe Londoner's grocery store on Larimer Street but outgrew the space and met at various hotels in Denver.

Theodore Roosevelt and William Taft were the only two presidents to receive an honorary membership in the form of a solid gold-and-silver membership card to the Denver Press Club.

During the 1908 National Democratic Convention, the Denver Press Club served as press headquarters and organizers of the convention's social entertainment.

In 1925, members decided to have their own building and chose architects Merill H. and Burnham Hoyt to design the building. The Denver Press Club building was built by Francis Kirchof for approximately $50,000, paid mostly with the sale of Who's Who in the Rockies. In 1945, artist Herndon Davis painted a wall-size mural of Denver journalists in the club's basement poker room. It remains there today.

In 1986, the building was designated an Historic Landmark by the Denver Landmark Preservation Commission. The Society of Professional Journalists deemed it as a "significant historical place in journalism" in 2008. It was listed on the National Register of Historic Places in 2017.

Today, the club's more than 400 members represent print and broadcast media, advertising and public relations, and an assortment of other professions. The roster has included Pulitzer Prize-winning journalists, cartoonists, and other notables, including Damon Runyon, Eugene Field, Gene Fowler, Frederick Gilmer Bonfils, Palmer Hoyt, Lowell Thomas, Lee Taylor Casey, Paul Conrad, Pat Oliphant, Thomas Hornsby Ferril, Carl Akers, Starr Yelland, Stormy Rottman, Lou Kilzer, Greg Lopez, Bob Palmer, Gene Amole, Sam Lusky, Rob Scoggins Jr., and Don Kinney.

The Denver Press Club's cornerstone Damon Runyon Award is presented annually to a person or persons whose career has embodied the style and verve of the legendary DPC alumnus.
