= Aaron Stark =

American mental health advocate (born 1979)

- Born: 1979 (age 46–47)
- Education: North High School (dropped out in sophomore year)
- Known for: Mental health advocacy, nearly committing a mass shooting
- Children: 4

Aaron Stark (born 1979) is an American mental health advocate who is best known for planning but not following through with a mass shooting in 1996.

== Early life ==
Stark spent most of his childhood in Denver, Colorado. According to Stark, he had grown up in a dysfunctional family: his biological father, a Vietnam War veteran, was abusive and violent towards him, his brother, and his mother, while his stepfather and mother struggled with substance abuse. According to Stark, he had seen his mother being beaten and raped during his childhood. Due to his family being constantly on the run from law enforcement, Stark never attended the same school for more than six months, and he went to 40 different schools. According to himself, he was obese, awkward, dirty (because his home lacked running water), and bullied at school. He began cutting himself at the age of 14 or 15. After being kicked out of his house at the age of 15 or 16 and becoming homeless, and resorting to sleeping in his friend's shed, he sought mental help. Social services allegedly brought his abusive mother to the meeting, who accused him of fabricating his mental health issues. Reportedly, his mother had told him after the meeting that she would buy him sharper razor blades if he planned to slit his wrists to commit suicide. According to Stark, after he had sought mental help a second time, his psychologist told him that nothing could be done and refused him inpatient care. He dropped out of high school at age 17.

=== Planned shooting and dissuasion ===
In 1996, while homeless, Stark began planning to attack either North High School or the food court of a nearby mall and to then commit suicide afterwards. Stark had planned to trade cannabis to obtain a gun from his family's drug dealer. According to him, his primary motive was to make his parents feel shame for creating him, and not out of a specific hatred of anyone in the school or mall.

Stark was days away from committing the mass murder when he changed his mind. His friend, Mike Stacey, who was unaware of Stark's plans, had invited Stark in for a shower and some food, after Stark had visited him with the intent of saying goodbye. He ended up staying for five days at Stacey's house. Stark credits this incident, and his inability to obtain weapons, with stopping him from committing the mass shooting.

Months after the incident, Stark was on the verge of suicide again, but was dissuaded after his friend Amber Schneider invited him to a movie and baked him a blueberry-peach pie for his birthday.

== Advocacy ==
External videos
- Stark's 2018 TEDx speech

Stark went public about his former plans to commit a mass shooting via an open letter to 9News in Denver in 2018, one day after the Parkland shooting. A TEDx conference speech Stark made has gone viral, with over 15 million views on YouTube as of December 2025.

Jonny Santana, a filmmaker, was moved by the Stark's speech and gathered 150 volunteers from San Diego to film a movie about Stark as a youth. The movie, Just Another Tuesday, premiered in November 2019.

== Personal life ==
Stark lives in Denver, Colorado, is married, has four children, and maintains friendships with both Schneider and Stacey.
