= Fourth Church of Christ, Scientist (Denver) =

Historic church in Colorado, United States

- U.S. National Register of Historic Places
- Colorado State Register of Historic Properties
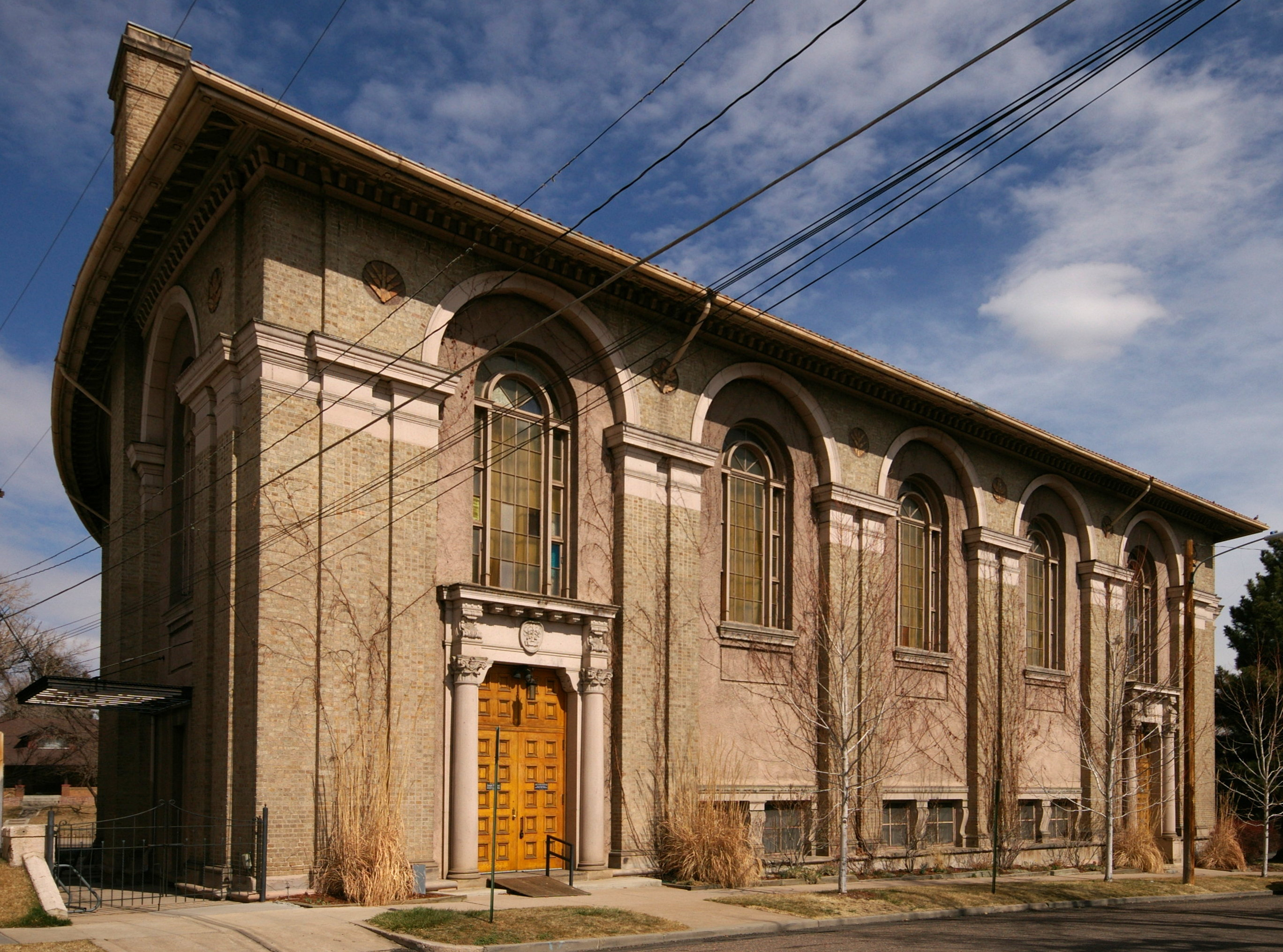

- Location within Colorado Location within the United States
- Location: 3101 W. 31st Ave., Denver, Colorado
- Coordinates: 39°45′40″N 105°1′37″W
- Built: 1921
- Architect: Hoyt, Burnham F.; Hoyt, Merrill H.
- Architectural style: Renaissance
- NRHP reference No.: 04000336
- CSRHP No.: 5DV.611
- Added to NRHP: April 21, 2004

The former Fourth Church of Christ, Scientist, located at 3101 West 31st Avenue, in Denver, Colorado, is a historic structure that on April 21, 2004, was added to the National Register of Historic Places.

== National register listing ==
- Fourth Church of Christ, Scientist (added 2004 - Building - #04000336)
- Now occupied by The Sanctuary
- 3101 W. 31st Ave., Denver
- Historic Significance: Architecture/Engineering
- Architect, builder, or engineer: Hoyt, Merrill H., Hoyt, Burnham F.
- Architectural Style: Renaissance
- Area of Significance: Architecture
- Period of Significance: 1900-1924
- Owner: Private
- Historic Function: Religion
- Historic Sub-function: Religious Structure
- Current Function: Religion
- Current Sub-function: Religious Structure

== See also ==
- List of Registered Historic Places in Denver County, Colorado
- List of former Christian Science churches, societies and buildings
- Fourth Church of Christ, Scientist (disambiguation)
