= Owen Estate =

- U.S. National Register of Historic Places
- U.S. Historic district
- Colorado State Register of Historic Properties
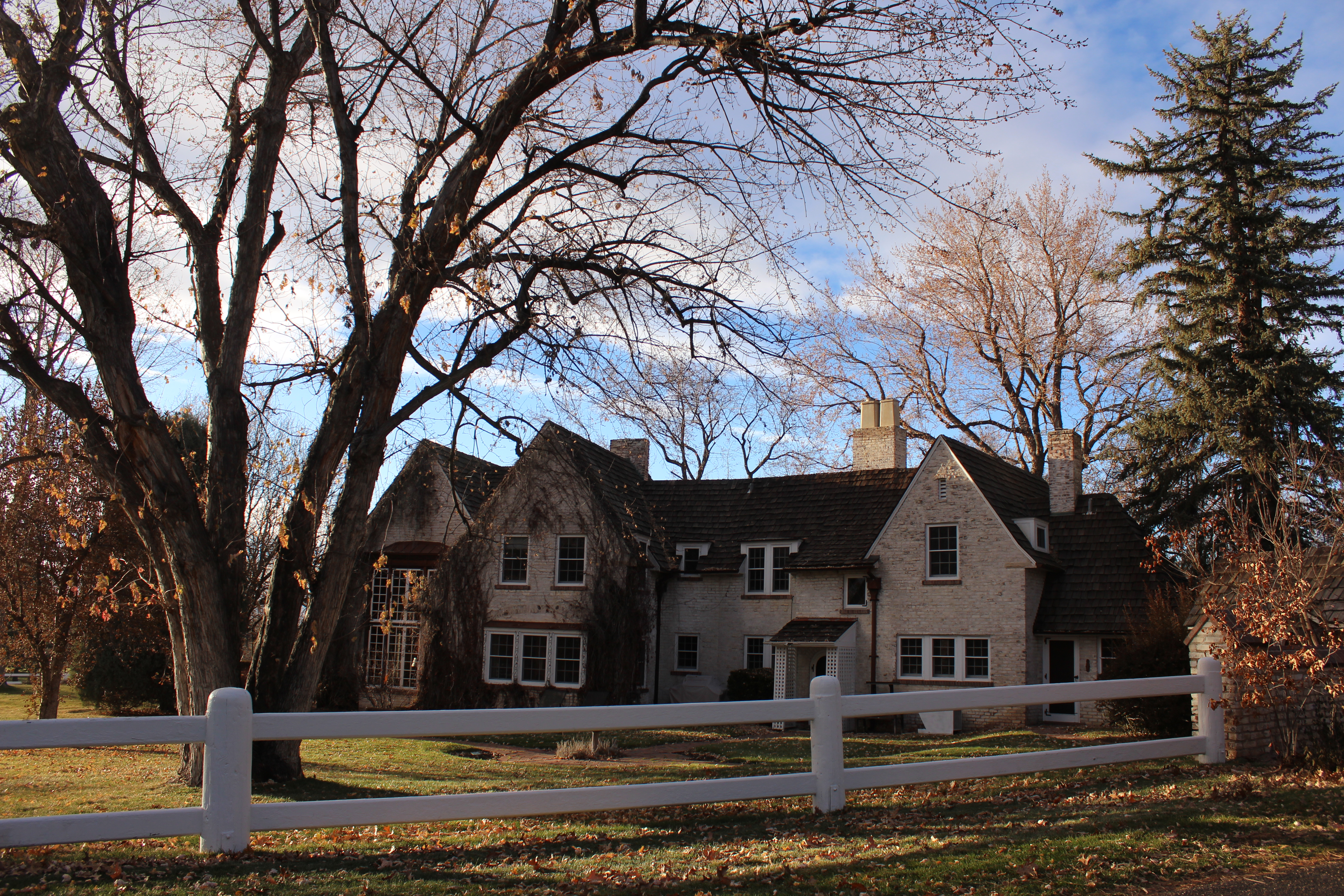

- Location within Colorado Location within the United States
- Nearest city: 3901 S. Gilpin St., Cherry Hills Village, Arapahoe County, Colorado
- Coordinates: 39°38′50″N 104°58′3″W
- Area: 4.9 acres (2.0 ha)
- Built: 1923
- Architect: Merrill H. Hoyt
- Architectural style: Late 19th and 20th Century Revival: Tudor Revival
- NRHP reference No.: 99001143
- CSRHP No.: 5AH.1569
- Added to NRHP: September 17, 1999

The Owen Estate is a home located at 3901 S. Gilpin St. in Cherry Hills Village, Colorado. It was built in the early 1920s on five acres of landscaped grounds in Tudor Revival style.

The property includes a "mansion, a complex gatehouse consisting of a gardener's shed/tank house connected by a brick entry arch to an adjacent water tower, a sizable chicken house, and a small coal shed. The property is predominantly bordered by a wood fence constructed of massive timbers, along with a brick wall along a portion of Gilpin St."

== See also ==
- National Register of Historic Places listings in Arapahoe County, Colorado
