= Maitland Estate =

Historic house in Colorado, United States

- U.S. National Register of Historic Places
- U.S. Historic district
- Colorado State Register of Historic Properties
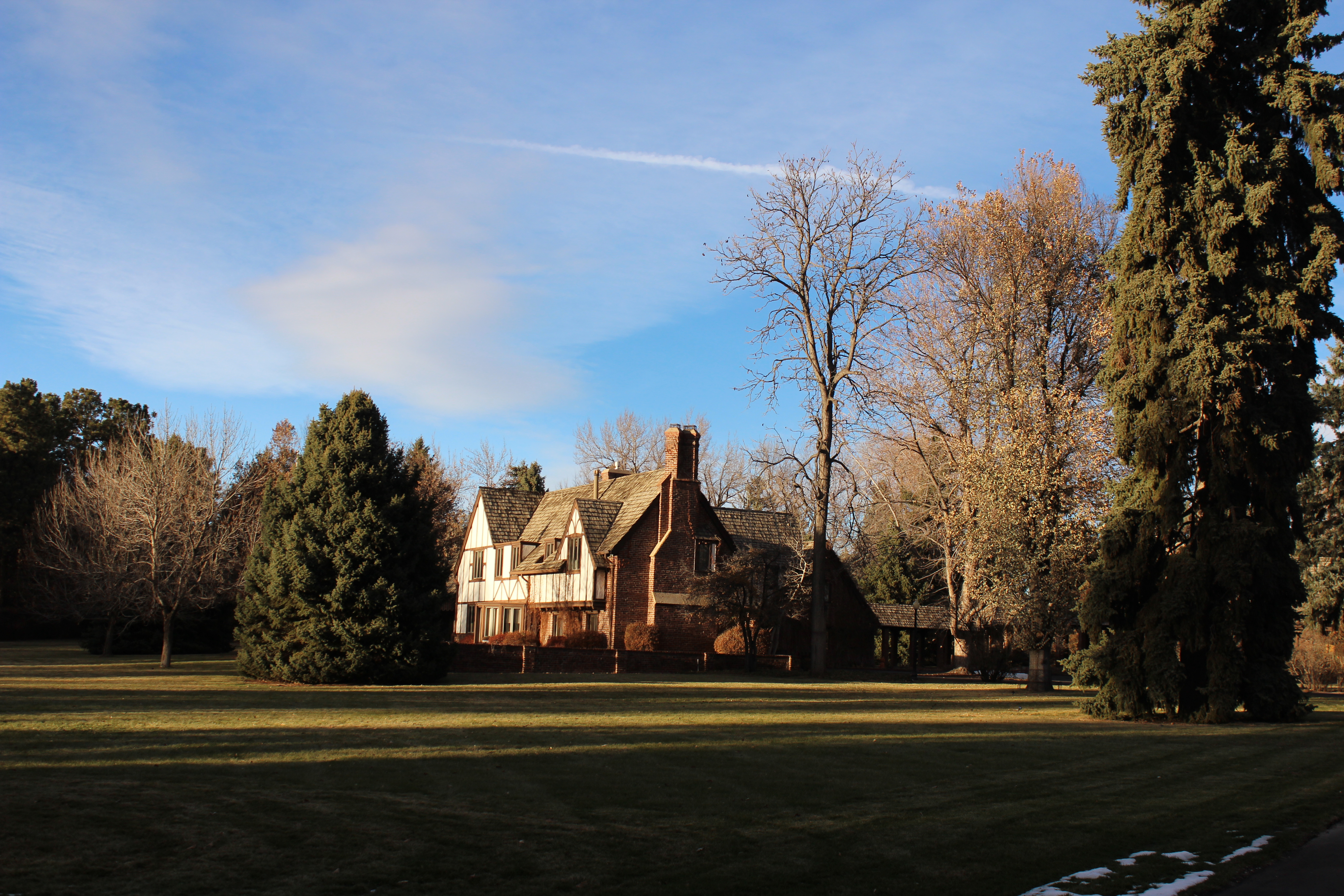
- Maitland Estate, 9 Sunset Dr. Cherry Hills Village

- Location within Colorado Location within the United States
- Location: 9 Sunset Dr., Cherry Hills Village, Colorado
- Coordinates: 39°38′52″N 104°57′35″W
- Area: 4.2 acres (1.7 ha)
- Built: 1925
- Architect: Hoyt, Burnham, F.; Hoyt, Merrill H.
- Architectural style: Tudor Revival
- NRHP reference No.: 98001130
- CSRHP No.: 5AH.1431
- Added to NRHP: September 3, 1998

The Maitland Estate is a historic home located at 9 Sunset Drive. in Cherry Hills Village, Colorado. Designed by Denver architects Merrill H. Hoyt & Burnham F. Hoyt and built in 1925 in a Tudor Revival style. The estate was the home of Denver business leader James Maitland who operated the Colorado Builders’ Supply.

The listing included a 4.2 acres (1.7 ha) area.

It has an L-shaped plan, 82 feet (25 m) on its north–south axis and 71 feet (22 m) on its east–west. Through its first of two stories it is built of brown brick laid in common bond.

== See also ==
- National Register of Historic Places listings in Arapahoe County, Colorado
