= Homelessness in Colorado =

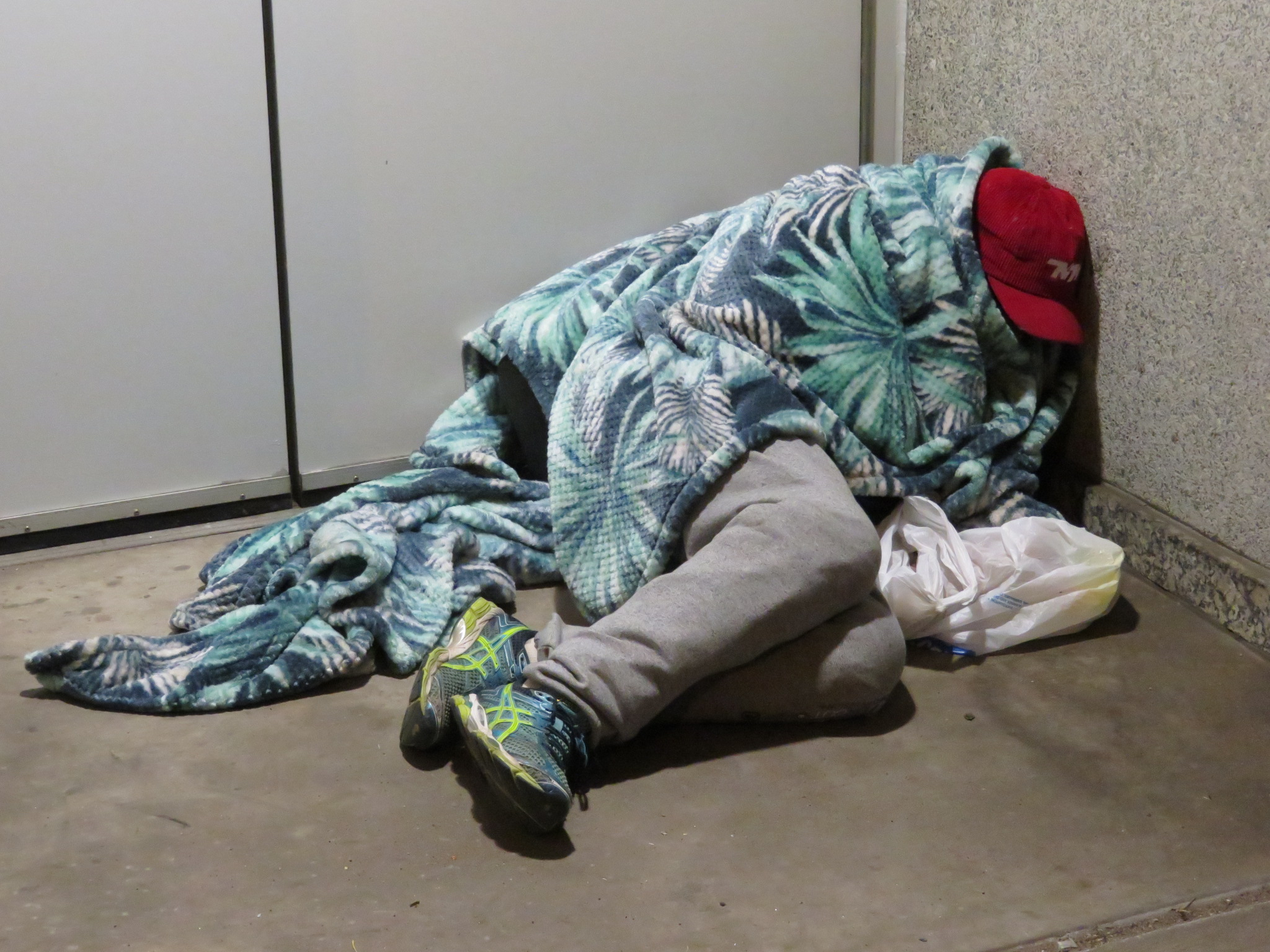
Homeless man sleeping in 3 °C (37 °F) weather at the Colorado Supreme Court Building

Homelessness is a growing problem in Colorado and is considered the most important social determinants of health (State of Colorado). Homelessness is very difficult for many Coloradoans to escape due to the continuous increase in costs for housing in Colorado, along with mental health treatments and other factors. When people are forced to live without stable shelter, they are then exposed to a number of risk factors that affect physical and mental health (State of Colorado). Although it is difficult to pin point any one cause of homelessness, there is a complicated combination of societal and individual causes.

According to the U.S. Department of Housing and Urban Development's (HUD) Point-in-Time (PIT) Count, there were 10,857 people who were homeless within the state of Colorado in 2018. The number of homeless people increased from 2016 to 2017 by 1,121. Colorado was ranked 7th in 2017 for largest homeless veteran count as well as 8th in the country out of 48 major metropolitan cities for homeless individuals.

== Homelessness in Denver ==
While he was Mayor of Denver, Colorado, Colorado Governor John Hickenlooper made dealing with the issues that underlie homelessness a top priority on his agenda, speaking heavily on the issue during his first "State of the City" address in 2003. While Denver's homeless population is much lower than other major cities, the homeless residents have often suffered without shelter during the cold winters. In 2006, officials said that this number had risen over the past few years.

=== Urban Camping Ban ===
In April 2012, Denver enacted the Urban Camping Ban due to the Occupy Denver protest and the number of homeless on the 16th Street Mall. The ordinance was developed because businesses and individuals in Denver complained to the Mayor's Office and City Council about the number of people who were sleeping in front of their business doorways being disruptive and making it uncomfortable for individuals to enter their businesses. In addition, Occupy Denver had taken over public space near the capital building in Denver and it became a homeless compound consisting of tents and other structures. Councilman Albus Brooks sponsored the legislation. Mayor Michael Hancock and the City Council passed the Urban Camping Ban which prohibited individuals from sleeping in public places with a blanket over them or something between them and the ground. The Civil Liberties Union wrote a strong letter in opposition to the Denver ordinance.

== Contributions ==
There are numerous factors which contribute to Colorado's homelessness rate that are not only caused by the state, but both individually and partially by the cities themselves.

=== Lack of affordable housing ===
The number of residents that have moved to Colorado since 2011 totals nearly 650,000. This influx of residents has caused a shortage in affordable housing and contributed to the price of home ownership and renting increasing yearly. The costs have become so expensive that a person has to make nearly four times the state's minimum wage to afford a medium-priced rental. This model is unsustainable per the which describes rent as being considered affordable if it is less than 30% of someone's total monthly income.

=== Lack of shelters ===
Research has also indicated a vast shortage in shelter capabilities and resources. The number of homeless people, which was nearly 11,000 in 2018, consisted of families, veterans and chronically homeless. According to, Denver, the state's capitol, can shelter less than ten percent of its homeless population, and other cities advertise their lack of shelters and resources in an effort to deter people from going to those cities. This means that people are forced to seek shelter wherever available and usually violate of one of the city ordinances, like no camping bans. During the winter months, shelters are on a first-come, first-served basis, and people are often waiting for hours in the cold for the doors to open. This is especially challenging for those trying to work because if they are not in line at a certain time, they will likely not get shelter that evening. There are simply not enough shelters or resources to handle the entire homeless demographic and too many limitations on getting into a shelter for the evening, which contributes to the limited progress of addressing this issue. In order to make a significant impact, the state can adopt multiple new methods that were proven effective in other places to help curb the demographic much faster.

==== Medical treatment ====
Accountable care organizations (ACO's) conducted research and found that housing needs had to be addressed before a person could effectively engage in medical treatment, and by addressing this issue first, medical costs were reduced by 53%. Therefore, addressing housing needs can reduce medical treatment and further strain on resources.

=== Mental health ===
The biggest portion of homeless people in Colorado can be categorized as those with mental illnesses. There is a shortage of mental health services for these people. The most common mental health issues among the homeless include depression, anxiety, schizophrenia, and bipolar disorder. Therapy sessions, psychiatric hospitals, rehabilitation facilities, and prescription drugs are the most common mental health treatment options for the public, however, the homeless are unable to afford them. There are organizations who strive to help the homeless by providing food, shelter, and clothes, but there are currently not many organizations focused only on improving homeless people's mental health. Organizations currently use government funding, grants from private companies, and donations. New and more dynamic services for the homeless affected by mental health could be paid for in the same way.

According to Bharadwaj, Pai, and Suziedelyte (2017), people are less likely to report that they have a mental health issue when compared to other medical conditions that may be ailing them. This stigma and fear of reporting is leading to many people deciding not to try and fight there disease on their own rather than seeking help.

==== Housing ====
Housing the homeless has been proven to help reduce homelessness, but that does not solve the mental health issue that a lot of homeless people possess. If organizations adopt a new program to house the homeless, get them counseling, and then help them get a job and food on the table, this will enhance their quality of life and their recovery process. The effects of mental health and the number of homeless people with mental health issues would be drastically diminished through programs of this nature.

=== Perception ===
Another factor is the perception that most people are homeless due to their own actions. While this may be true for a rare few, the majority are reluctant to seek services that could help better their situation due to fear of discrimination. Research conducted by, shows that the homeless population are perceived as less than human and are not worthy of support or assistance. They often face contempt and prejudice amongst fellow homeless and normal residents. This is contributing to the perpetuation of chronic homelessness as people are too afraid to seek assistance and support.

=== Poor handling of homeless populations ===
The final factor is how the cities are handling this demographic. As of 2018, there have been 350 "anti-homeless" ordinances enacted across Colorado which criminalize daily survival necessities of the homeless, even though criminalizing these behaviors fails to mitigate the root causes and maintains conditions that keep people homeless. While the cities have enacted these ordinances to combat hazards associated with the homeless such as fires, trash, crime, and tent cities, it instead creates a revolving door of street to jail, jail to street.

== Legislation ==
Despite Colorado's growing homelessness problem, there has been a stout lack of legislation to help curb this growth.

=== Right to Rest Act ===
In 2015, the Right to Rest Act was introduced to Colorado (as well as Oregon and California) and would have changed the way Denver treats unsheltered citizens. The act attempted to offer homeless people rights to sleep on public property like parks and sidewalks. The bill was postponed indefinitely on March 14, 2018, as the local government argued many effects from the piece of legislature would impact local law enforcement and funds such as city maintenance and enforcement relief.

== See also ==
- Homelessness in the United States by state
