= Highlands Masonic Lodge =

- U.S. National Register of Historic Places
- Colorado State Register of Historic Properties
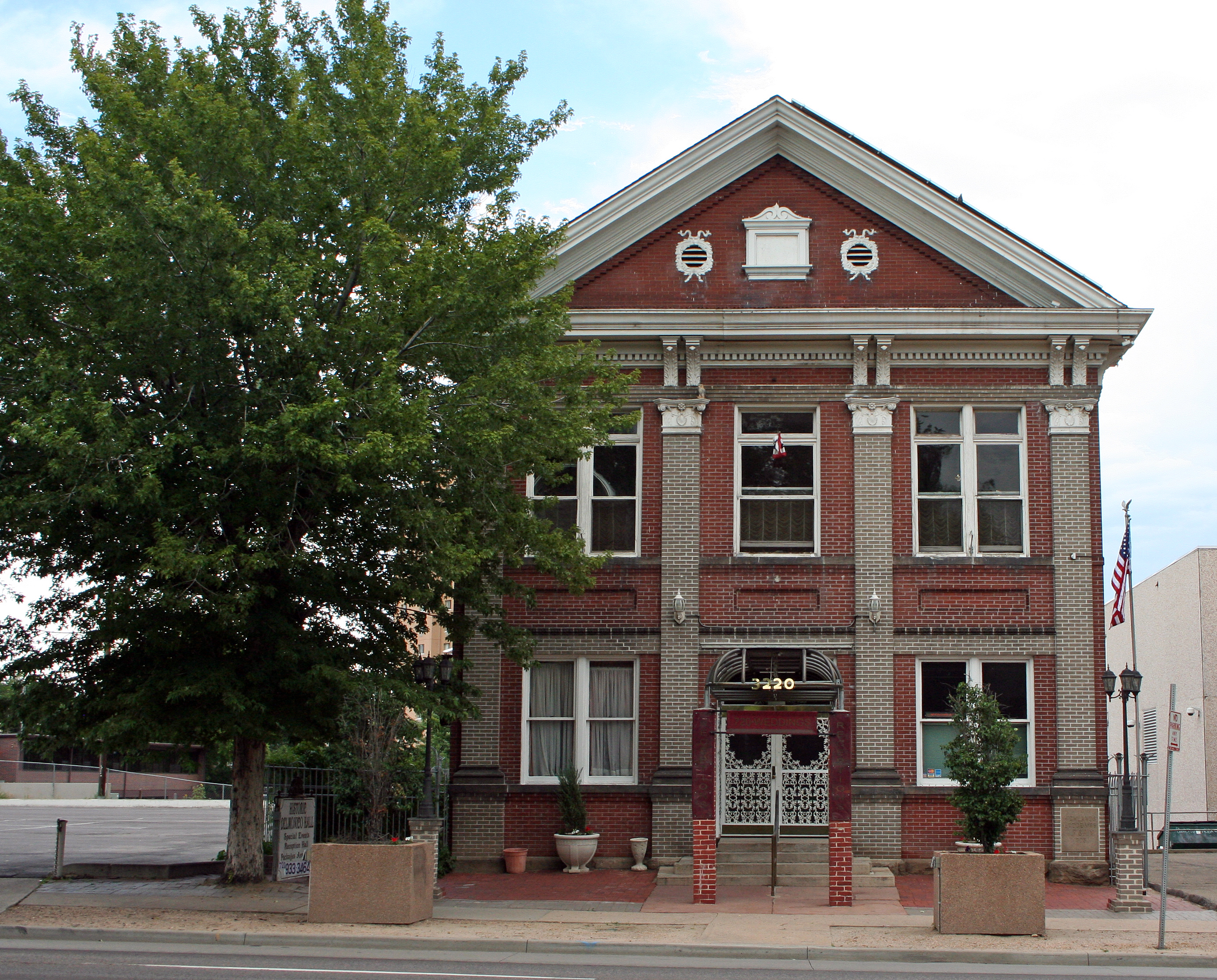

- Location within Colorado Location within the United States
- Location: 3220 Federal Blvd., Denver, Colorado
- Coordinates: 39°45′45″N 105°1′27″W
- Area: less than one acre
- Architectural style: Classical Revival
- NRHP reference No.: 95001337
- CSRHP No.: 5DV.303
- Added to NRHP: November 22, 1995

The Highlands Masonic Lodge, also known as the Pythian Building, is a historic building located in Denver, Colorado. Built in 1905 and constructed in the Classical Revival style, it was listed on the National Register of Historic Places in 1995.

Originally constructed as a meeting place for the Knights of Pythias, it was later the meeting place of Highlands Lodge No. 86, Ancient Free and Accepted Masons.

It is a two-story red brick front-gabled building with four gray brick pilasters in its symmetrical front facade. It is 36 by 75 feet (11 m × 23 m) in plan. Its cornice and pediment are supported by decorative brackets.

It is unusual for a Classical Revival building to have been front-gabled, but that configuration can work well in a narrow lot as here.

== See also ==
- Masonic Temple Building (Denver, Colorado), also NRHP-listed
