= Montview Boulevard Presbyterian Church =

Historic church in Colorado, United States

- U.S. National Register of Historic Places
- Colorado State Register of Historic Properties
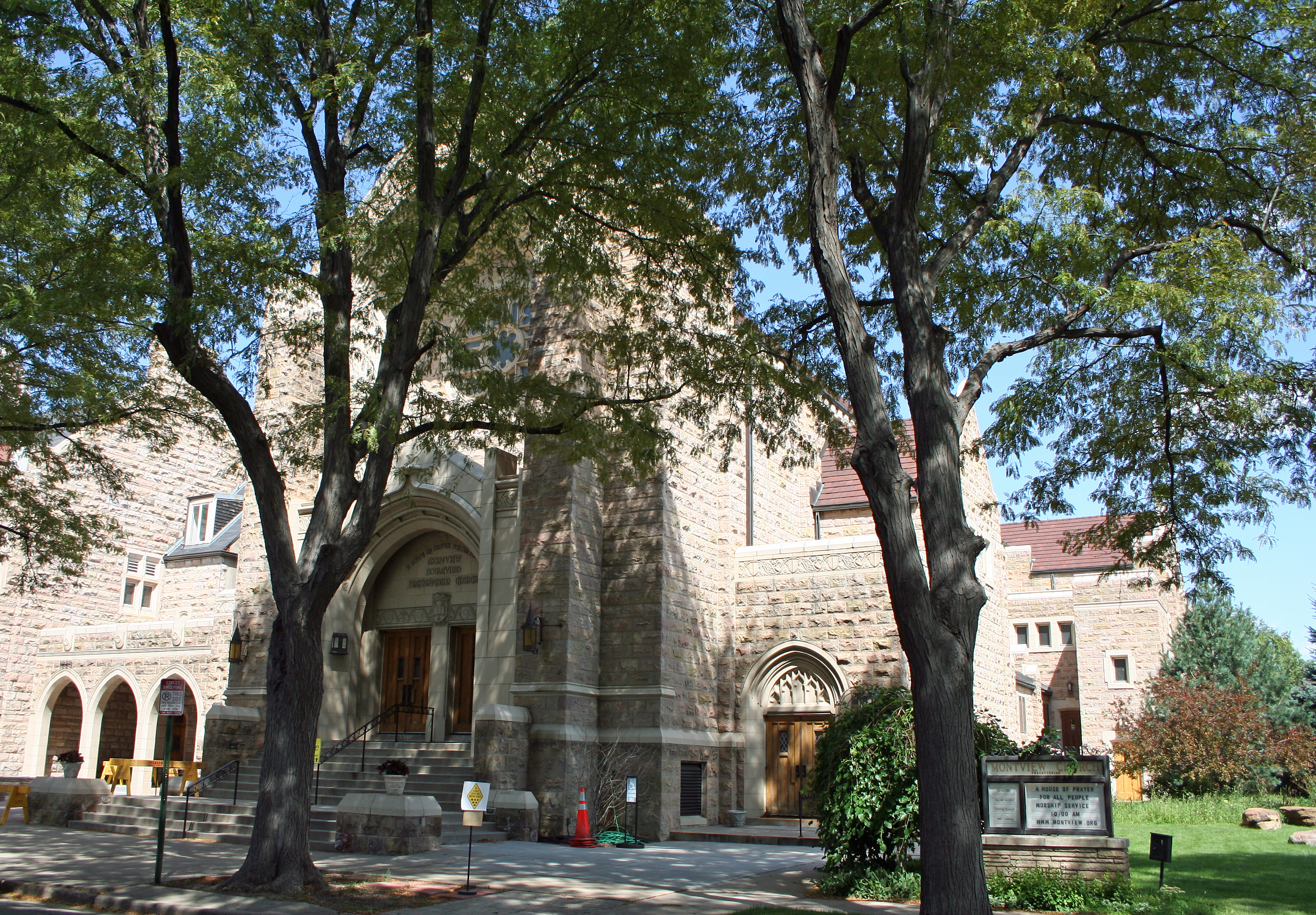

- Location within Colorado Location within the United States
- Location: 1980 Dahlia St., Denver, Colorado
- Coordinates: 39°44′49″N 104°55′52″W
- Area: less than one acre
- Built: 1910
- Architect: Frank W. Frewan
- Architectural style: Richardsonian Romanesque, Gothic Revival
- NRHP reference No.: 04000262
- CSRHP No.: 5DV.9034
- Added to NRHP: April 6, 2004

The Montview Boulevard Presbyterian Church is a historic church at 1980 Dahlia Street, on the corner of Montview Boulevard, in Denver, Colorado. It was built in 1910 and was added to the National Register in 2004.

It was built as a tiny chapel in Richardsonian Romanesque style in 1910 and expanded, also in Richardsonian Romanesque style, in 1918, with the expansion designed by architects Frank W. Frewan and Harry J. Manning. An education wing was added in 1926, also in Richardsonian Romanesque style, designed by Hoyt and Hoyt. It was further expanded in 1958 in Gothic Revival style.
