= Burnham Hoyt =

American architect (1887–1960)

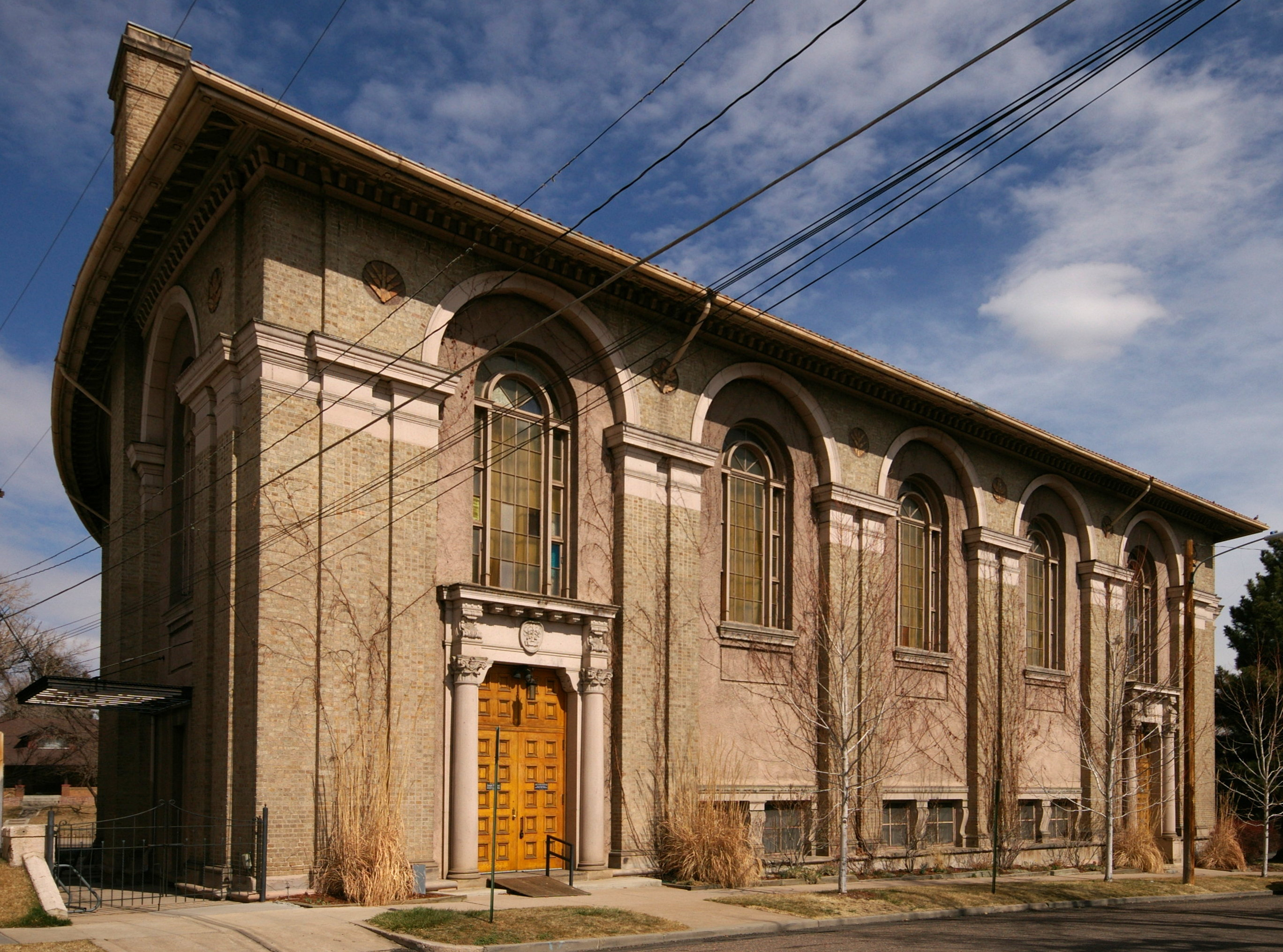
Fourth Church of Christ, Scientist, Denver, Colorado

Burnham Hoyt FAIA (February 3, 1887 – April 3, 1960) was a prominent mid-20th-century architect born in Denver, Colorado.

== Early years ==
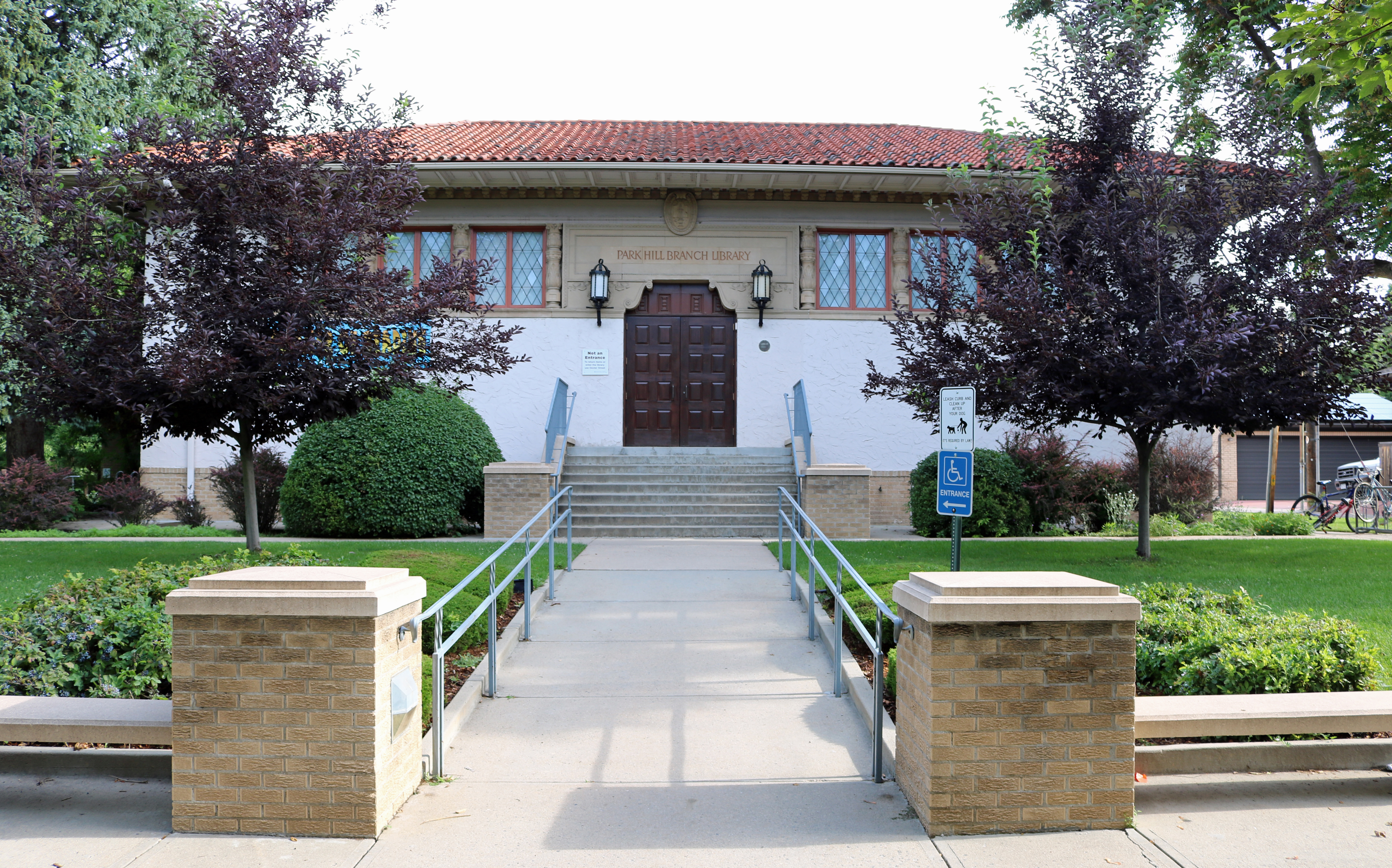
Denver Public Library Park Hill Branch

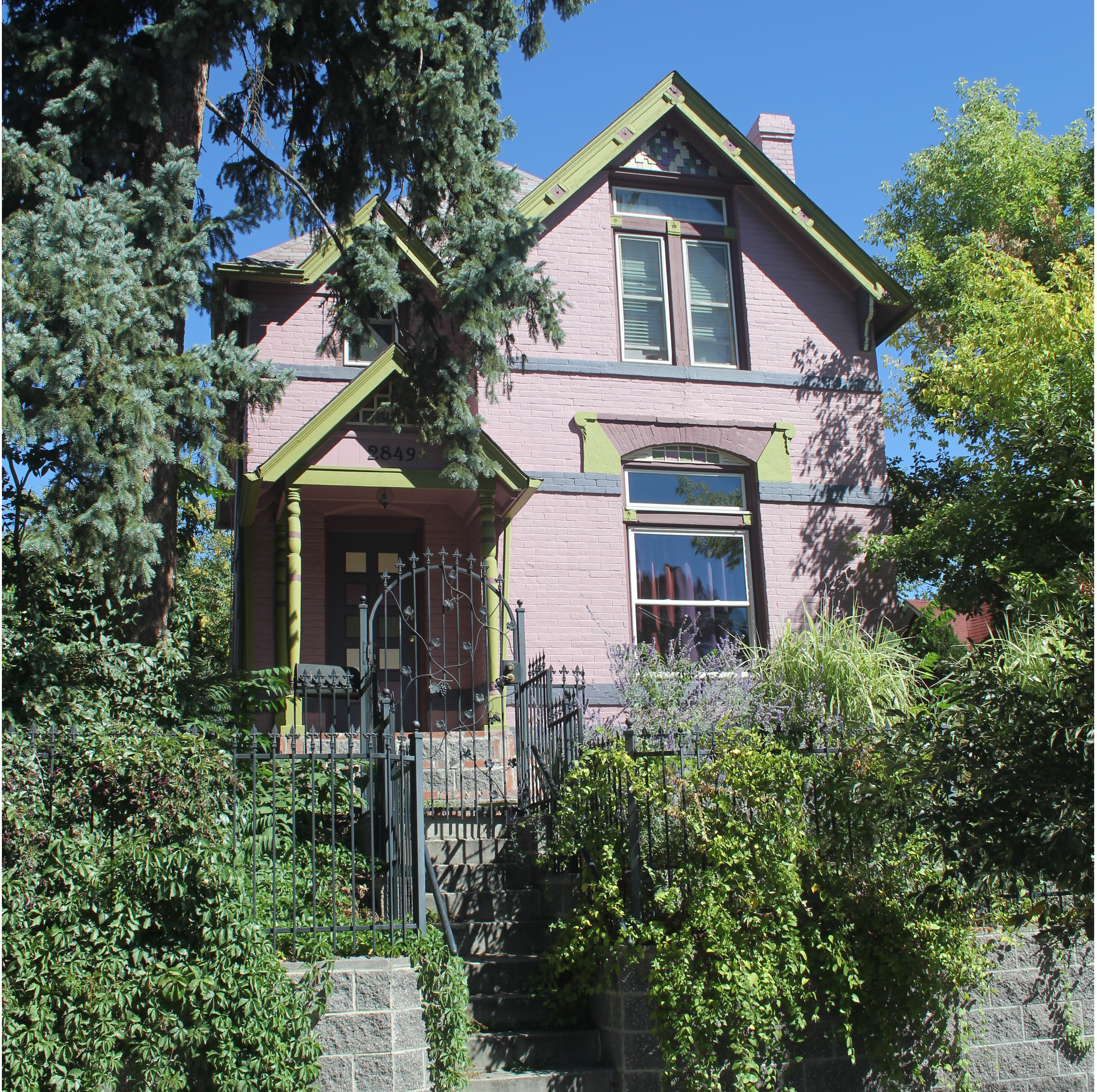
The Hoyt Residence located at 2849 West 23rd Avenue Denver, Colorado was the family home of Merrill and Burnham Hoyt.

Born in North Denver, Burnham Hoyt was the son of Lydia Tompkins Hoyt and Wallace Hoyt, a carriage designer who emigrated from New Brunswick, Canada. He is the younger brother of Denver architect Merrill H. Hoyt. He grew up in the house located at 2849 West 23rd Avenue Denver and would return to that residence later in life. Burnham graduated from Denver’s North High School in 1904 and apprenticed with the Denver architectural firm of Kidder and Wieger. In 1908, he left Denver to study at the Beaux-Arts Institute in New York City, where he won 6 Beaux-Arts design competitions and continued his professional training at the well-respected New York firm of George Post and Bertram Goodhue. While there, he designed the interior woodwork for New York City’s St. Bartholomew Church. After serving two years in the U.S. Army during World War I, where he designed camouflage in France, he returned to Denver in 1919 to join his brother Merrill and form the Denver architectural firm of M.H. and B. Hoyt, Architects.

== Later years ==
The Hoyt brother's firm prospered during the post war years and they designed numerous commercial, residential academic and religious buildings in Denver. Their buildings incorporated various historical styles, including English Gothic, Spanish Baroque, Greek Revival and Romanesque. In later years, Burnham would embrace Art Deco and the modernist International Style.

In 1926, Burnham returned to New York when he was commissioned by John D. Rockefeller to design the interior of Riverside Church.

He worked several years as a Professor of Architectural Criticism at New York University, and in 1930 he became the Dean of the School of Architecture.

On February 11, 1933, the Hoyt brothers' partnership ended suddenly when his brother Merrill died of a heart attack at age 52.

In 1936 at age 49, Burnham married interior designer Mildred Fuller and returned to Denver.

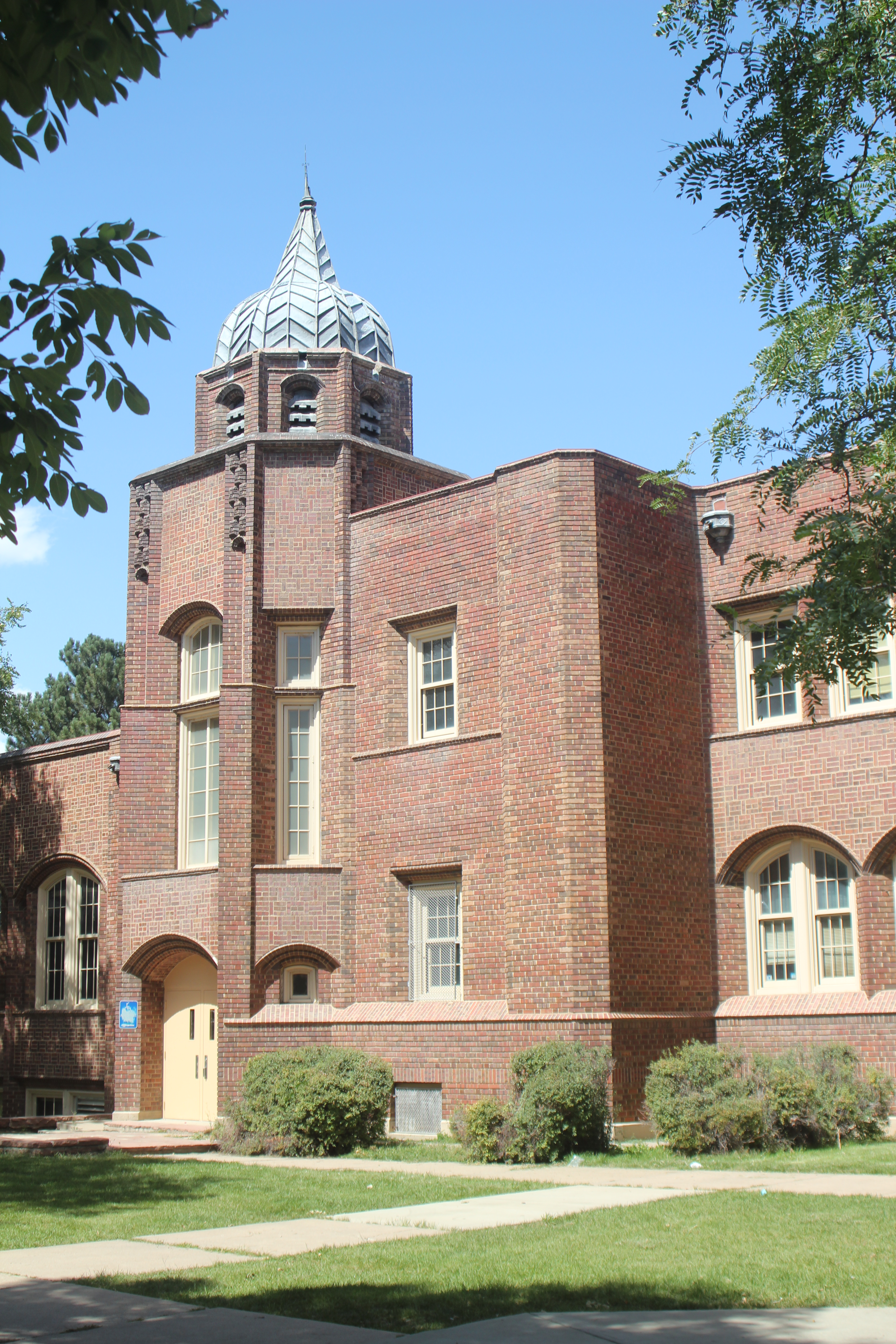
Lake Junior High Denver, CO

He owned his own firm in Denver from 1933 to 1955. In 1953, he was elected to the National Academy of Design as an associate academician. He received an honorary doctorate from Denver University, the Civic Princeps Award from Regis College, and a fellowship for design in the American Institute of Architects.

Burnham Hoyt was diagnosed with Parkinson disease in the early 1950s and died at the home he designed for himself at 3130 East Exposition Ave. in Denver.

A number of his works are listed on the National Register of Historic Places.

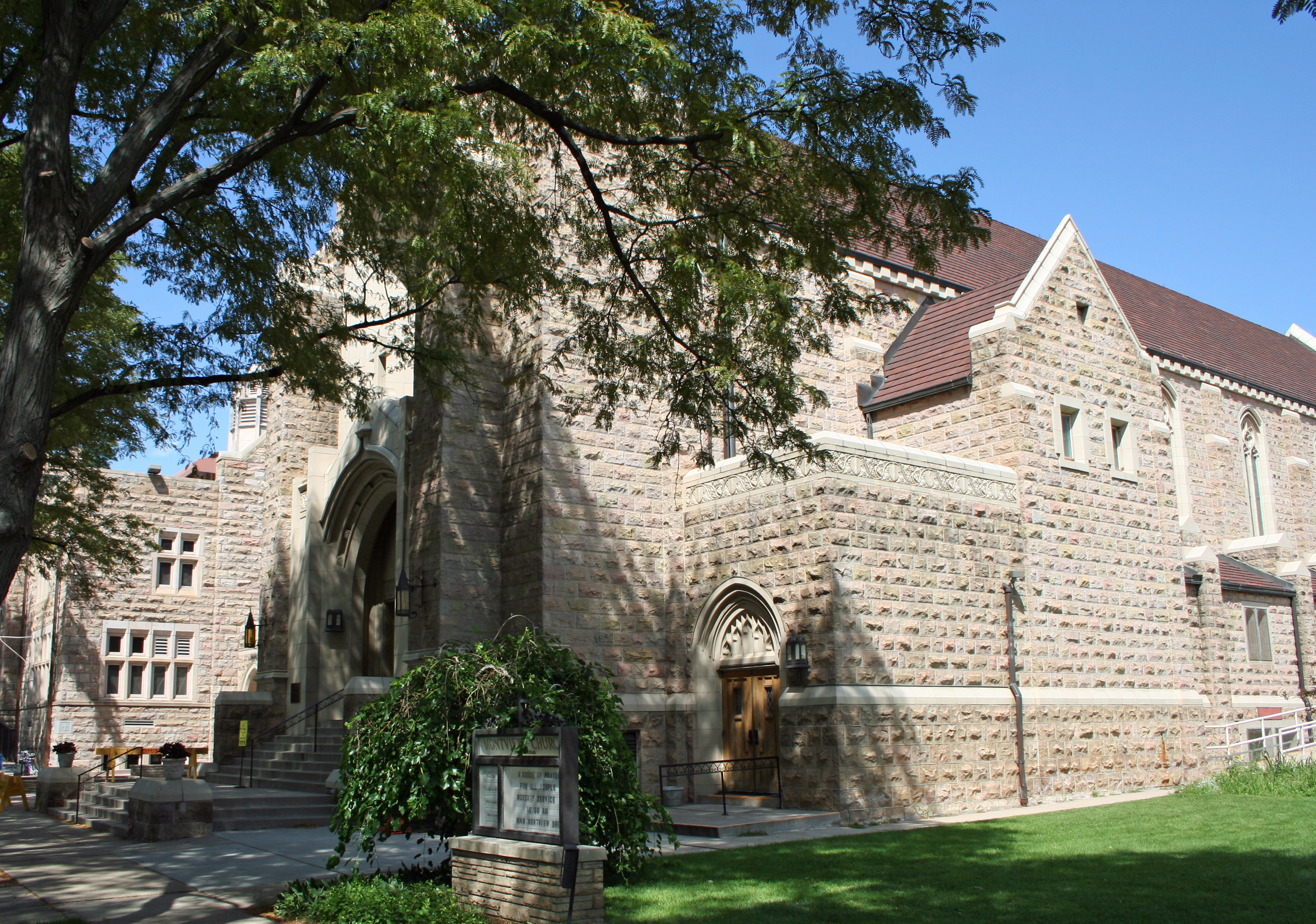
Montview Presbyterian Church Denver, CO

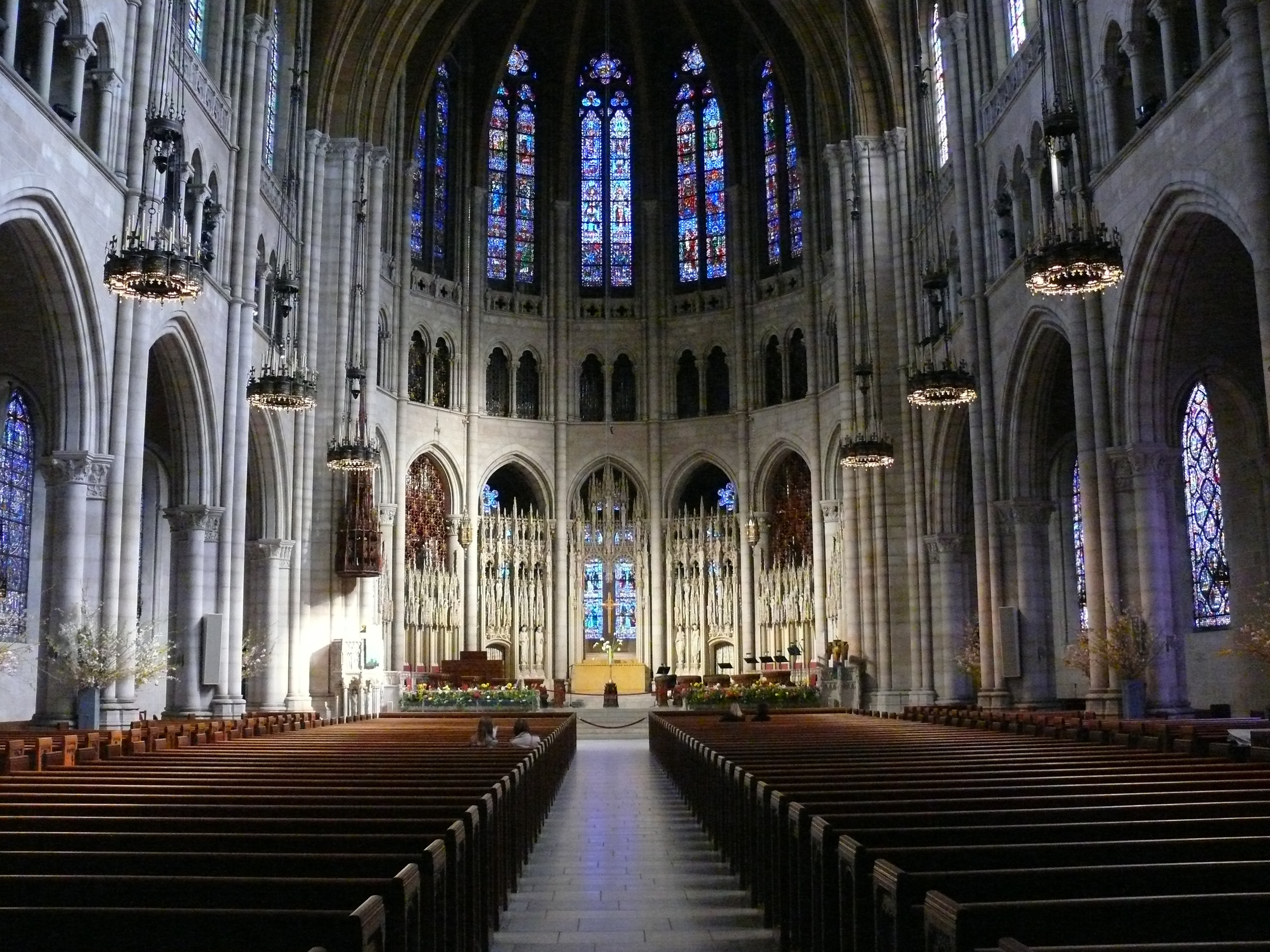
Interior of Riverside Church New York, NY

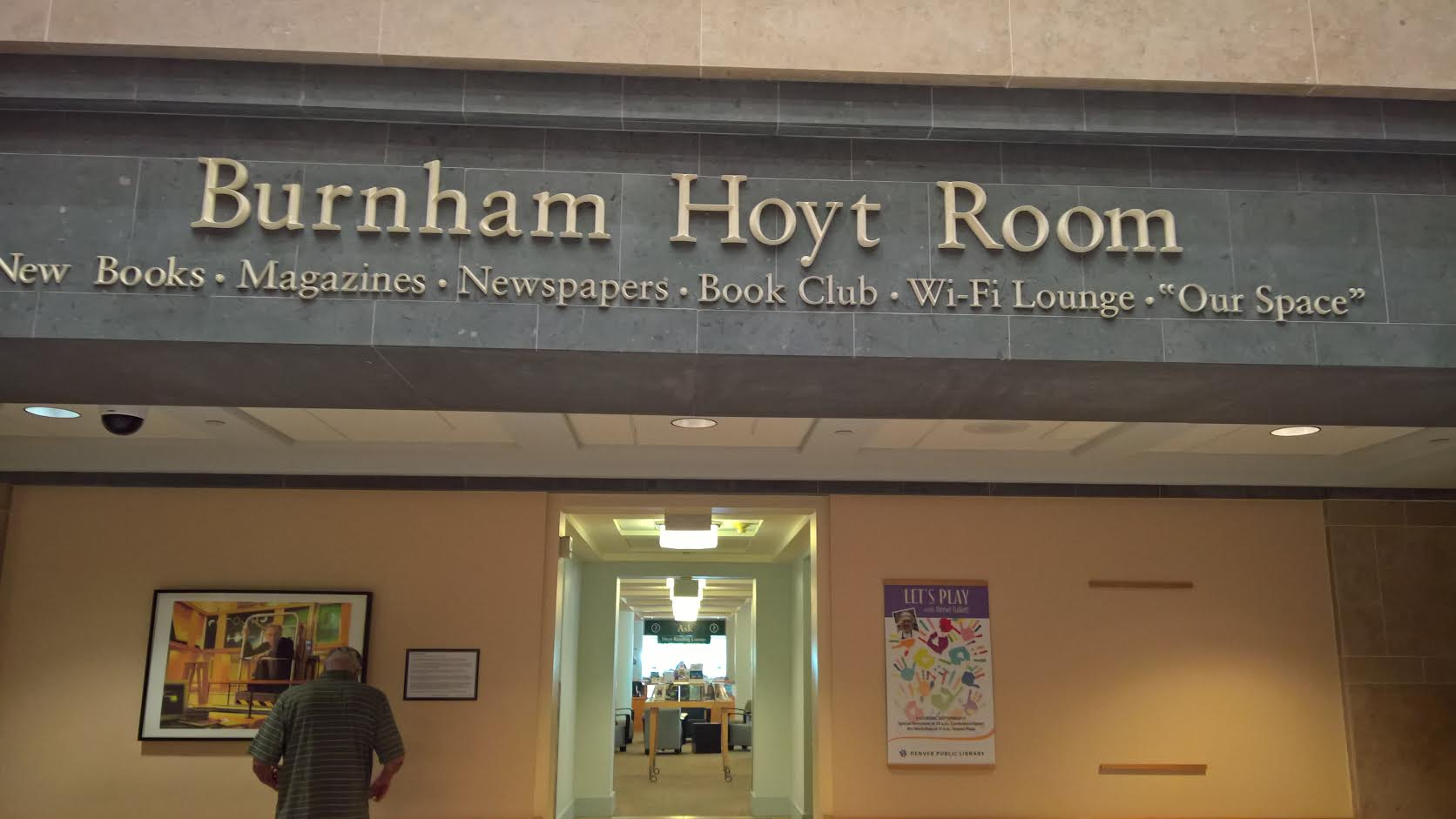
Burnham Hoyt Room, Denver Public Library

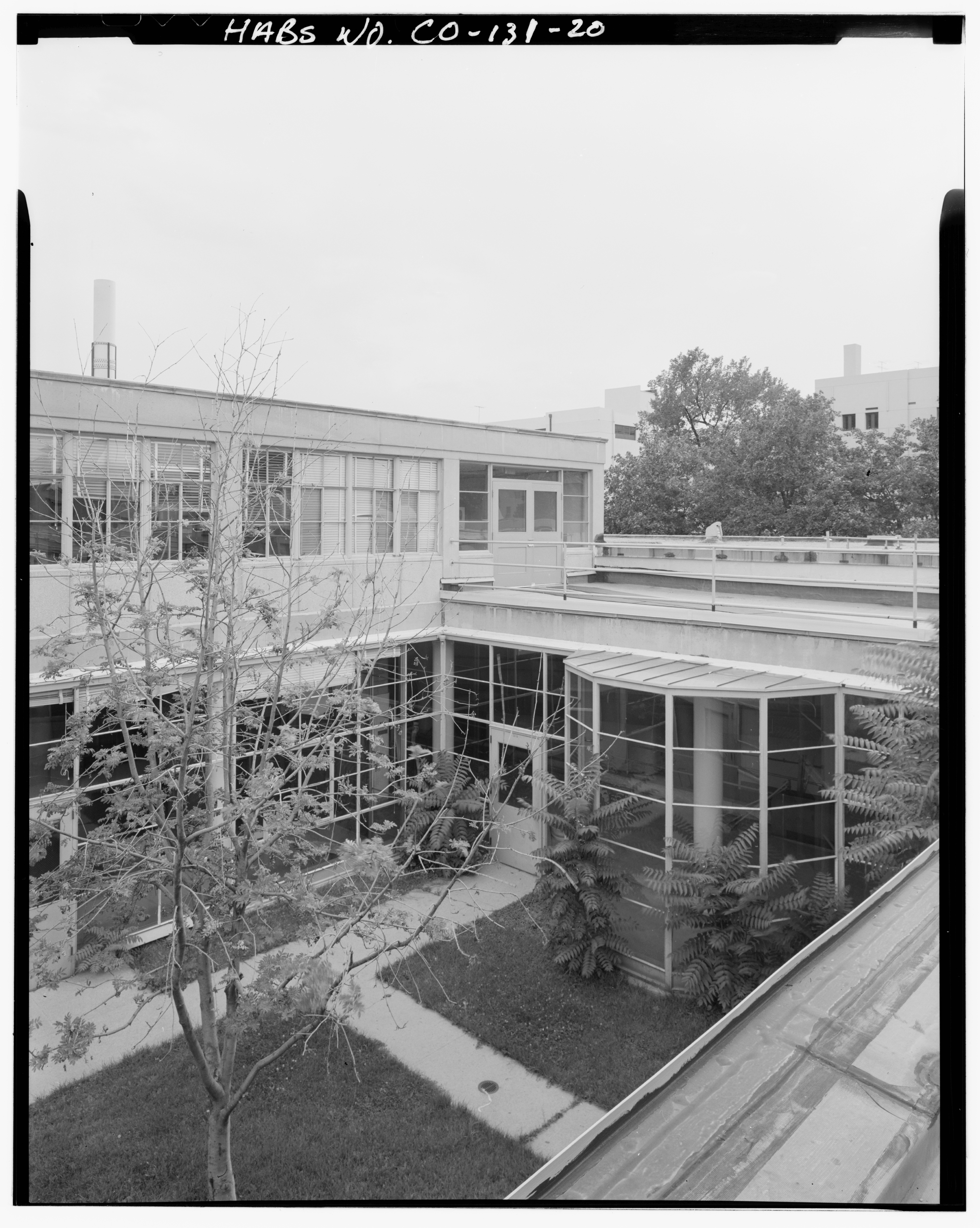
Boettcher School for Crippled Children

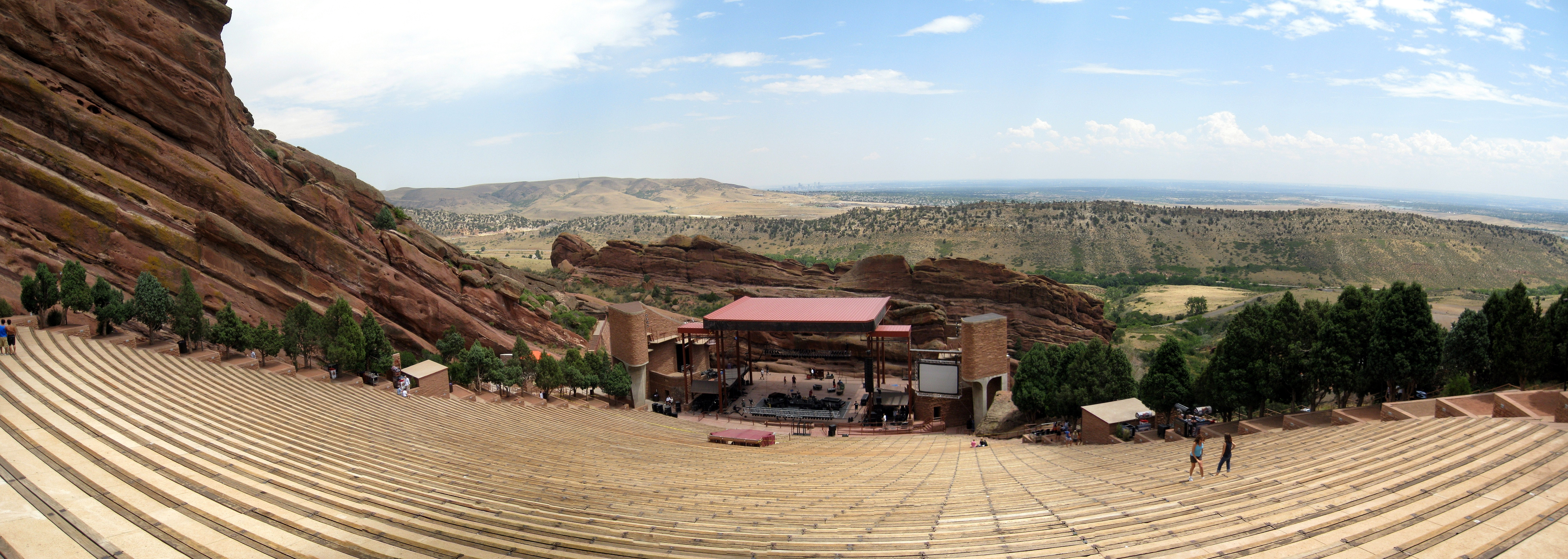
Red Rocks Amphitheater

== Credited buildings (partial list) ==
Building Name	Location	Date	Status
Fourth Church of Christ Scientist	3101 W. 31st Ave. Denver, CO	1920	
Merritt Gano Jr. House	101 High St. Denver, CO	c. 1920	Country Club National Register Historic District
Denver Public Library - Park Hill Branch	4705 Montview Blvd., Denver, CO	1920	Denver Local Landmark
Merryweather House	375 Humboldt St. Denver, CO	1922	Country Club National Register Historic District
Crammer House (addition)	200 Cherry St. Denver, CO		National Register of Historical Places
Anne Evans Mountain House (remodel)	1970 Evans Ranch Rd. Evergreen, CO	1924	National Register of Historical Places
Cherokee Castle	Cherokee Ranch Hwy.85 Sedalia, CO	1924-26	National Register of Historical Places
Unnamed House	840 Gaylord St. Denver, CO	1925	Morgan Subdivision Local Historic District
Cactus Club Clubhouse	444 14th St. Denver, CO	1925	Demolished
Colorado National Bank (addition)	900-918 17th St. Denver, CO	1925	
Davis House	385 Gilpin St. Denver, CO	1925	Country Club National Register Historic District
Denver Central Market (originally H.H. Tammen Curio Company warehouse)	2669 Larimer Street, Denver, CO	1928	
Denver Press Club	1330 Glenarm Pl., Denver, CO	1925	Denver Local Landmark
Maitland Estate (with Merrill Hoyt)	9 Sunset Dr. Cherry Hills Village	1925	National Register of Historical Places
Phi Delta Theta	1111 College Ave. Boulder, CO	1925	National Register of Historical Places
Standart-Cleworth House	2025 E. 7th Ave. Denver, CO	1925	Seventh Avenue Local Historic District
Harrington School	3230 E. 38th Ave. Denver, CO	1926	
Lake Junior High School (with Merrill Hoyt)	1820 Lowell Blvd. Denver, CO	1926	Denver Local Landmark
Charles S. and Marie Thomas House	380 Gilpin St. Denver, CO	1926	Country Club National Register Historic District
Donald Bromfield House	100 Gaylord St. Denver, CO	1927	Country Club National Register Historic District
Montview Blvd. Presbyterian Church, Education Wing	1980 Dahlia St. Denver, CO	1927	National Register of Historical Places
Riverside Church (associated with Collens, Allen and Pelton)	490 Riverside Dr, New York, NY	1927-30	National Register of Historical Places
Sigma Nu Fraternity	1722 Illinois St. Golden, CO	1928	
St. Martin's Chapel at St. John's Cathedral (with Merrill Hoyt)	1313 Clarkston Denver, CO	1928	National Register of Historical Places
Steele Elementary School (addition)	300 S. Marion Pkwy Denver, CO	1929	Denver Local Landmark
Albany Hotel (addition)	1720 Stout St. Denver, CO	1938	Demolished
Boettcher School for Crippled Children	1900 Downing St. Denver, CO	1938	Demolished
Maer House (Sullivan House)	545 Circle Dr. Denver, CO	1940	
Red Rocks Amphitheatre	16351 County Rd 93 Morrison, CO	1941	National Historic Landmark
Nurses Quarters	Fitzsimmons Army Medical Center, Aurora CO	1942-44	Demolished
Infirmary Ward Buildings 203 &206	Fitzsimmons Army Medical Center, Aurora CO		Demolished
Burnham F. Hoyt House	3130 E. Exposition Denver, CO	1947	
Central Library, Denver Public Library	10 W. 14th Ave. Denver, CO	1955	National Register of Historical Places
Garry House	E 7th Ave Denver CO		
Waring House	Hawthorn Pl. Denver, CO		
Broadmoor Hotel (addition)	Colorado Springs, CO		
Colorado Springs High School (addition)	Colorado Springs, CO	1941	
Central City Opera House (additions and alterations)	124 Eureka St. Central City, CO		National Register of Historical Places
