= Aurora, Colorado =

City in Colorado, US

- Home rule municipality
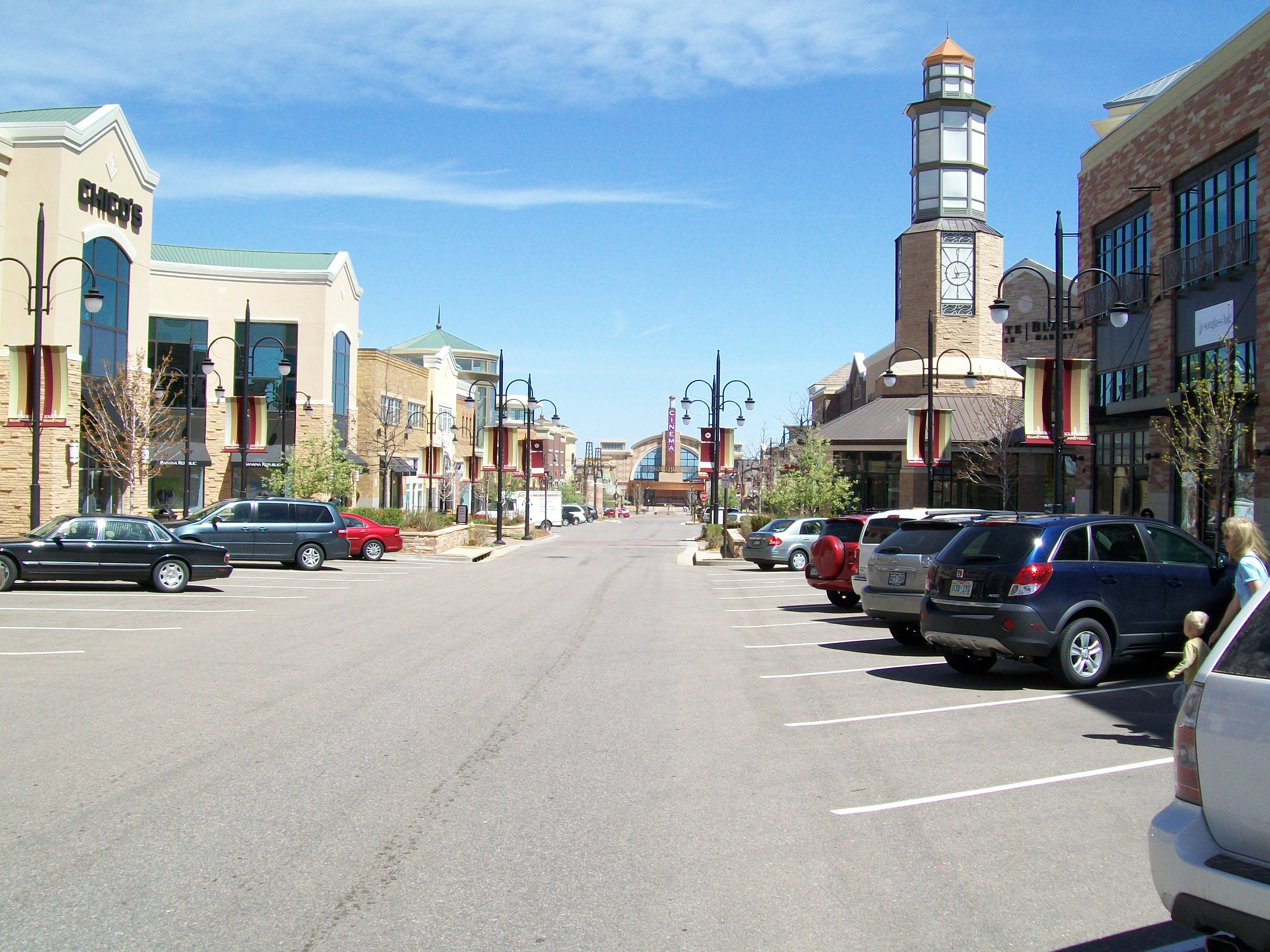
- The Southlands shopping mall in Aurora

- Flag Seal
- Nicknames: The Gateway to the Rockies; The Sunrise of Colorado
- Interactive map of Aurora, Colorado
- Location within Colorado Location within the United States
- Coordinates: 39°42′32″N 104°43′17″W
- Country: United States
- State: Colorado
- Counties: Arapahoe, Adams, and Douglas
- Platted: 1891 as Fletcher, Colorado
- Incorporated (town): May 5, 1903, as the Town of Fletcher
- Incorporated (city): March 9, 1928, as the City of Aurora

Government
  - Type: Home rule city
  - Mayor: Mike Coffman (R)

Area
  - Total: 165.180 sq mi (427.81 km^{2})
  - Land: 164.601 sq mi (426.31 km^{2})
  - Water: 0.579 sq mi (1.50 km^{2})
  - Rank: 2nd in Colorado; 56th in the United States
- Elevation: 5,558 ft (1,694 m)

Population (2020)
  - Total: 386,261
  - Estimate (2025): 410,053 ▲
  - Rank: 3rd in Colorado; 50th in the United States
  - Density: 2,412/sq mi (931/km^{2})
- Demonyms: Auroran
- Time zone: UTC−07:00 (MST)
  - Summer (DST): UTC−06:00 (MDT)
- ZIP Codes: 80010-80019, 80040-80047 (all but 80045 PO Boxes), 80247
- Area codes: 303/720/983
- GNIS city ID: 2409757
- FIPS code: 08-04000
- Website: City of Aurora

Aurora (/əˈroʊrə/) is a home rule city located within Arapahoe, Adams, and Douglas counties in the U.S. state of Colorado. The city's population was 386,261 at the 2020 census, with 336,035 residing in Arapahoe County, 47,720 in Adams County, and 2,506 in Douglas County. It is the third-most populous city in Colorado and the 50th-most populous city in the United States as of 2025. Aurora is a principal city of the Denver metropolitan area and a major city in the Front Range Urban Corridor.

== History ==
Before European settlement, the land that now makes up Aurora was the territory of the Arapaho, Cheyenne, Ute, and Sioux tribes. These lands were claimed by France in 1682 and subsequently became part of the 1803 Louisiana Purchase.

Aurora originated in the 1890 as the town of Fletcher, taking its name from Denver businessman Donald Fletcher who saw it as a real estate opportunity. He and his partners staked out four square miles (10 km^{2}) east of Denver, but the town—and Colorado—struggled after the Silver Crash of 1893. The Town of Fletcher was incorporated on May 5, 1903. Fletcher skipped town, leaving the community with a huge water debt. Voters decided to rename the town to Aurora after one of the subdivisions composing the town in 1907. The Aurora, Colorado, post office opened on January 15, 1908.

By February 1928, the town of Aurora had reached a population of over 2,000 and it was reincorporated as a city on March 9. Aurora slowly began to grow in Denver's shadow becoming the fastest-growing city in the United States during the late 1970s and early 1980s. Aurora, composed of hundreds of subdivisions, thus carries the name of one of the original development plats from which it sprang.

Aurora's population growth in recent decades has led to efforts for co-equal recognition with its larger neighbor. Former mayor Dennis Champine once expressed the somewhat whimsical notion that eventually the area would be called the "Aurora/Denver Metropolitan Area". Indeed, since the 2000 Census Aurora has surpassed Denver in land area, and much of Aurora is undeveloped, while Denver is more fully built-out. However, such efforts are somewhat hampered by the lack of a large, historically important central business district in the city. Aurora is largely suburban in character, as evidenced by the city's modest number of multi-story buildings.

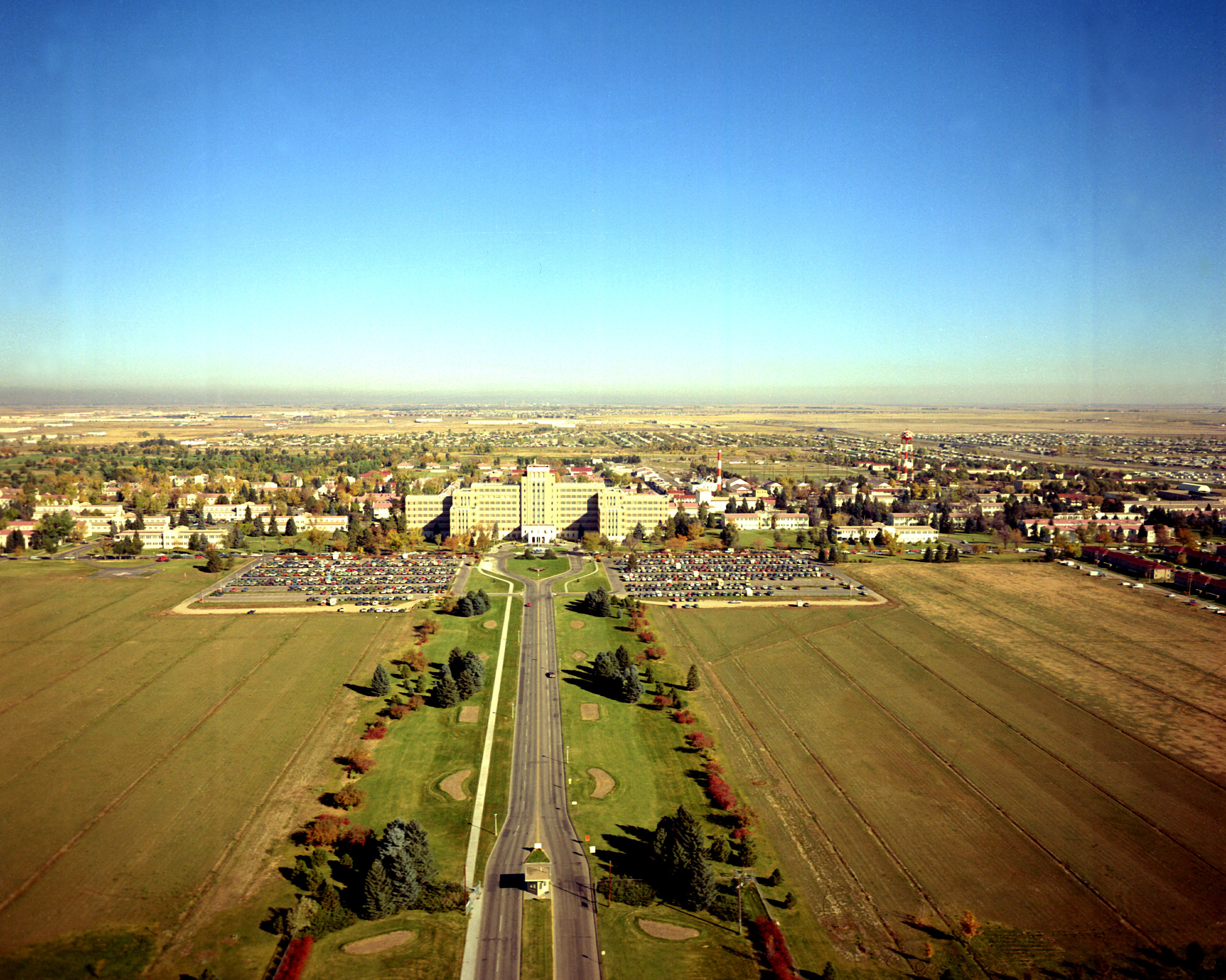
1973 aerial view of Fitzsimons Army Hospital in Aurora, before closure

A large military presence has existed in Aurora since the early 20th century. In 1918, Army General Hospital #21 (later renamed Fitzsimons Army Hospital) opened, with the U.S. government expanding and upgrading the hospital facilities in 1941 just in time to care for the wounded servicemen of World War II. Lowry Air Force Base was opened in 1938, straddling the border of Aurora and Denver. It eventually closed in 1994, and has been redeveloped into a master-planned community featuring residential, commercial, business and educational facilities. In 1942, the Army Air Corps built Buckley Field, which has been renamed Naval Air Station, Buckley Air National Guard Base, Buckley Air Force Base, and finally Buckley Space Force Base. The base, home of the Buckley Garrison and the 140th Wing Colorado Air National Guard, is Aurora's largest employer.

President Warren G. Harding visited Fitzsimons Army Hospital in 1923, and President Franklin D. Roosevelt visited in 1936. In 1943, the hospital was the birthplace of 2004 Democratic presidential candidate John Kerry. President Dwight D. Eisenhower recovered from a heart attack at Fitzsimons for seven weeks during the fall of 1955. Decommissioned in 1999, the facility is part of the Anschutz Medical Campus of the University of Colorado Denver, and the Fitzsimons Life Science District. The Anschutz Medical Campus also includes the University of Colorado Hospital, which moved to Aurora from Denver in 2007, and the Children's Hospital. The first carbon-ion radiotherapy research and treatment facility in the U.S. has been proposed at the site. These facilities will employ a workforce of 32,000 at build-out.

In 1965, mayor Norma O. Walker became the first woman to head a U.S. city with a population over 60,000.

In 1978, the cult coming-of-age film Over the Edge was filmed in Aurora; the crime drama has been named the "signature film" of Denver.

In 1979, it was announced that a science fiction theme park would be built in Aurora using the sets of a $50 million film based on the fantasy novel Lord of Light. However, due to legal problems the project was never completed. The script of the unmade film project, renamed Argo, was used as cover for the "Canadian Caper": the exfiltration of six U.S. diplomatic staff trapped by the Iranian hostage crisis.

In 1993, Cherry Creek State Park on the southwestern edge of Aurora was the location for the papal mass of the 8th World Youth Day with Pope John Paul II, attended by an estimated 500,000 people.

Aurora is split among three counties and lies distant from the respective county seats. A consolidated city and county government such as those found elsewhere in Colorado (Denver and Broomfield) was considered in the mid-1990s but failed to win approval by city voters; the issue was reconsidered in 2006.

Aurora Sports Park opened in 2003. In 2004, Aurora was honored as the Sports Illustrated magazine's 50th-anniversary "Sportstown" for Colorado because of its exemplary involvement in facilitating and enhancing sports. The city attracts more than 30 regional and national sports tournaments annually to Aurora's fields. Aurora's active populace is also reflected in the variety of professional athletes hailing from the city. Aurora's first semi-professional sports franchise, the Aurora Cavalry in the International Basketball League, began play in 2006 but folded by season's end due to budget mishaps.

In 2008, Aurora was designated an All-America City by the National Civic League.

Aurora pioneered the use of bank filtration in the United States, becoming one of the first U.S. cities to reap the benefits of siphoning water from beneath a riverbed upon completion of the Prairie Waters Project in 2010.

In 2017, the Republic of El Salvador opened a consulate in Aurora, serving Colorado, Kansas, Nebraska, and Wyoming. In 2024, the Republic of Honduras opened the city's second diplomatic post. La Plaza, the largest Hispanic food hall in the United States, opened in Aurora in 2024.

=== Aurora theater shooting ===
On July 20, 2012, Aurora was the site of the deadliest shooting by a lone shooter in Colorado (and the state's overall second deadliest, after the 1999 Columbine High School massacre). The shooting occurred just after midnight, when James Holmes opened fire during the midnight premiere of The Dark Knight Rises in a Century movie theater, killing 12 people and injuring 70 others. Holmes was arrested and was eventually sentenced to 12 life sentences in prison with an additional required 3,318 years. The shooting drew an international response from world leaders. U.S. President Barack Obama visited victims, as well as local and state officials, and addressed the nation in a televised address from Aurora on July 22. Actor Christian Bale, who plays Batman in the film, also visited some victims in hospitals. The events marked a turning point in recognition and public perception of the city; rather than referring to the site as being in "Denver" or "suburban Denver", as would have been typical before the event, virtually all media accounts of the incident unequivocally named "Aurora" as its location.

=== Elijah McClain ===
On August 30, 2019, Elijah McClain died six days after an unprovoked detention by two Aurora police officers. On June 27, 2020, Aurora Police in riot gear dispersed thousands of protestors at a violin concert held in his honor. On October 12, 2023, one of the officers involved in McClain's death was found guilty on charges of assault and negligent homicide, while another officer was acquitted on all charges against him, which included assault and reckless manslaughter.

=== 2024 U.S. Presidential Election ===
Aurora received national media attention during the run-up to the 2024 U.S. presidential election. In September 2024, statements made by mayor Mike Coffman and city council member Danielle Jurinsky, both Republicans, falsely claimed that the Venezuelan Tren de Aragua gang had taken control of an Aurora apartment complex and was extorting residents for their rent money. Jurinsky appeared on Fox News alleging "a huge cover-up" and that this "isn't just an Aurora issue." Presidential candidate Donald Trump repeated the claims during his September 10 debate with Kamala Harris, and subsequently scheduled a campaign rally in Aurora. Mayor Coffman denied the city was overrun by Venezuelan gangs. At the October 11 rally at Aurora's Gaylord Rockies Resort & Convention Center, Trump intensified his remarks regarding undocumented immigration and proposed an "Operation Aurora" to remove undocumented immigrants connected to gangs. At a press conference held the same day at Aurora's Stanley Marketplace to denounce Trump's rally, Colorado Governor Jared Polis said, "We welcome the eyes of the nation on a true Colorado gem, the great city of Aurora."

Following Trump's inauguration, U.S. Immigration and Customs Enforcement conducted raids targeting suspected Tren de Aragua gang members in Aurora and Denver. During a speech to a joint session of Congress on March 4, 2025, Trump falsely claimed immigrants "destroyed" Aurora and that the city had "buckled under the weight of migrant occupation." The apartment complex at the root of the controversy was eventually shut down by a court order describing it as a threat to public safety. Aurora's police chief, who advocated for the closure, stated that property mismanagement was to blame, and not gang activity among tenants.

== Geography ==
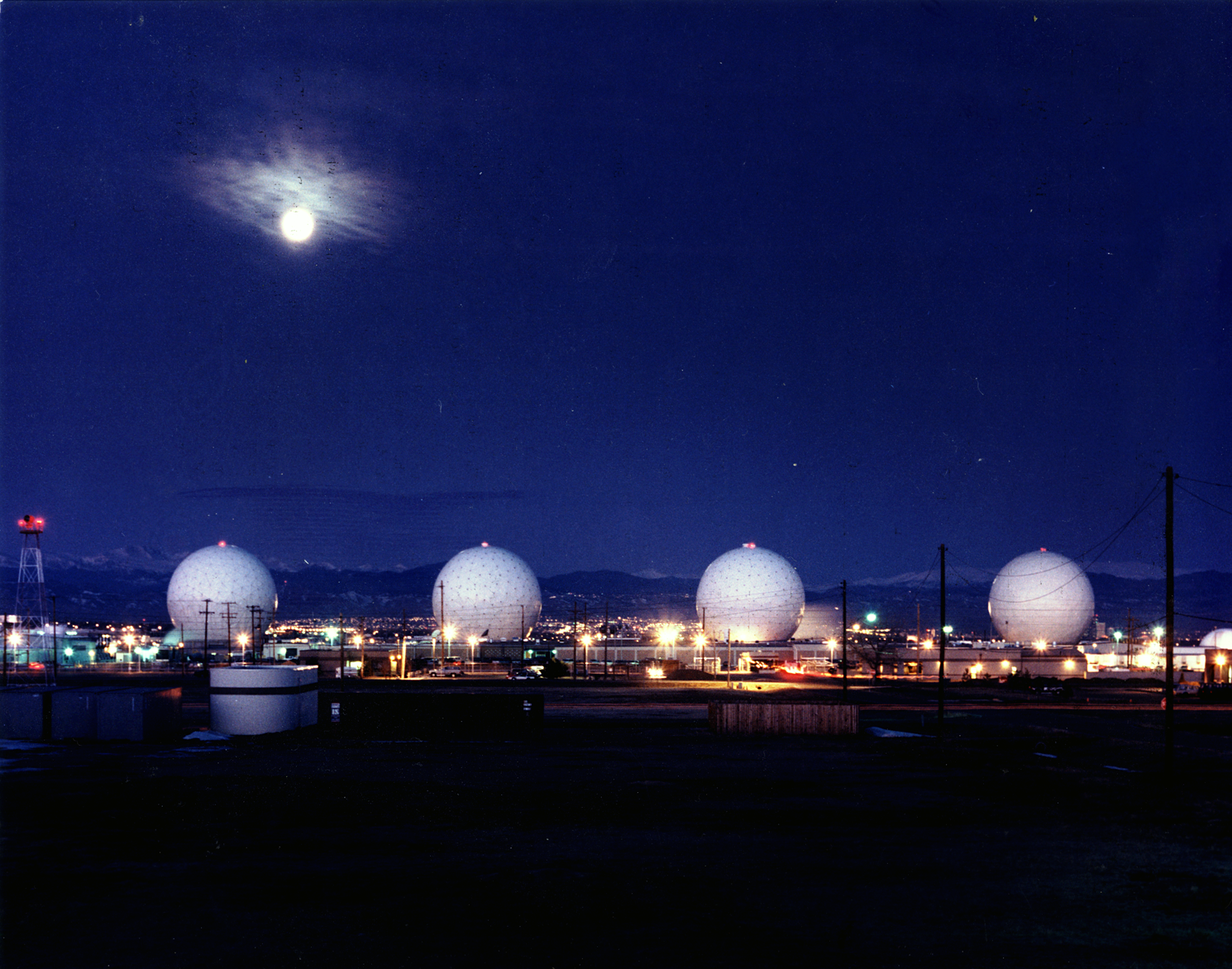
Buckley Space Force Base

Aurora's official elevation, posted on signs at the city limits, is 5,471 feet (1,668 m). However, the city spans a difference in elevation of nearly 1,000 feet (300 m). The lowest elevation of 5,285 feet (1,611 m) is found at the point where Sand Creek crosses the city limit in the northwest corner of the city, while the highest elevation of 6,229 feet (1,899 m) is on the extreme southern border of the city in Douglas County, near the intersection of Inspiration and Gartrell roads.

According to 2023 data published by the United States census, the city has a total area of 104,696 acres (423.691 km^{2}) including 371 acres (1.500 km^{2}) of water. The city is about 9 percent more extensive than neighboring Denver but 80 percent of the size of Colorado Springs, ranking as the 56th-largest U.S. city in land area.

=== Neighborhoods ===
Aurora is composed of dozens of neighborhoods, districts and (current and former) military installations. Among them:

- Adonea
- Anschutz Medical Campus
- Aurora Heights
- Aurora Highlands
- Aurora Hills
- Aurora Knolls
- Beacon Point
- Berkshire Village
- Blackstone
- Brookvale
- Buckley Space Force Base
- Carriage Place
- Centretech
- Chadsford
- Chaddsford Village
- Chambers Heights
- Chelsea
- Cinnamon Village II
- City Center
- Conservatory
- Copperleaf
- Corning
- Crestridge
- Cross Creek
- The Dam East
- Del Mar
- The Dam West
- Downtown A-Town (the Fletcher townsite, Aurora's "downtown")
- Eastridge
- East Quincy Highlands
- Fox Hill
- Greenfield
- Gun Club
- Hallcraft's Village East
- Hampton Hills
- Havana Heights
- Heather Gardens
- Heather Ridge
- Heritage Eagle Bend Golf Club
- Highline Villages
- Highpoint
- Hillside at Del Mar
- Hoffman Heights
- Horizon Uptown
- Horseshoe Park
- Hutchinson Heights
- Inspiration
- Jackson Farm
- Kingsborough
- Laredo-Highline
- Lowry Campus (formerly Lowry Air Force Base)
- Lynn Knoll
- Majestic Commercenter II
- Meadowood
- Meadow Hills
- Mission Viejo
- Morris Heights
- Murphy Creek
- Peoria Park
- Peterson
- Pheasant Run
- Piney Creek
- Pioneer Hills
- Ponderosa Ridge
- Porteos
- Prides Crossing
- Ptarmigan Park
- Queensborough
- Quincy Hill
- Rocking Horse
- Rocky Ridge
- Saddle Rock
- Sagebrush Farms
- Sand Creek Ranch
- Settler's Village
- Serenity Ridge
- Seven Hills
- Shenandoah
- Stapleton (a portion of the redevelopment of Denver's former airport lies in Aurora, directly north of Original Aurora)
- Siena
- Smoky Hill
- Smoky Ridge
- Sterling Hills
- Stricker's House
- Summer Valley Ranch
- Tallgrass
- Tallyn's Reach
- The Timbers
- Tollgate Run at Kingsborough
- Tollgate Village
- Traditions
- Tuscany
- Utah Park
- Village East
- Waters Edge
- Wheatlands
- Whispering Pines
- Willow Park
- Willow Trace
- Woodgate
- Woodrim

=== Surrounding municipalities ===
	North: Denver	
West: Denver, Centennial	Aurora	East: Watkins, Bennett, Strasburg
	South: Greenwood Village, Centennial, Foxfield, Parker	

=== Climate ===
Aurora experiences a semi-arid climate (Köppen climate classification BSk), with four distinct seasons and modest precipitation year-round. Summers range from mild to hot, with generally low humidity and frequent afternoon thunderstorms, and Aurora also averages about one dozen tornado warnings throughout tornado season, running from April to July. Although a touchdown does occur every couple of years, tornadoes are typically weak and short lived. Aurora residents typically hear the tornado sirens go off numerous times more than residents in Denver, to the West. All of Aurora is located east of I-25, where tornado alley begins. Hailstorms, at times one to two-plus feet deep happen on occasion, and typical hailstorms are very common throughout these months. July is the warmest month of the year, with an average high of 89 °F (32 °C) and an average low of 57 °F (14 °C). Winters range from mild to occasional bitter cold, with periods of sunshine alternating with periods of snow, high winds and very low temperatures. December is the coldest month of the year, with an average high of 43 °F (6 °C) and an average low of 17 °F (−8 °C). The average first snowfall in the Aurora area occurs in late October and the average final snowfall occurs in late April, although snow has fallen as early as September 4 and as late as June 5. Generally, deciduous trees in the area are bare from mid November to mid March.

Climate data for Aurora, Colorado
Month	Jan	Feb	Mar	Apr	May	Jun	Jul	Aug	Sep	Oct	Nov	Dec	Year
Record high °F (°C)	76 (24)	75 (24)	83 (28)	89 (32)	97 (36)	105 (41)	108 (42)	104 (40)	100 (38)	96 (36)	81 (27)	73 (23)	108 (42)
Mean daily maximum °F (°C)	45 (7)	47 (8)	55 (13)	62 (17)	71 (22)	82 (28)	89 (32)	86 (30)	78 (26)	67 (19)	53 (12)	43 (6)	65 (18)
Mean daily minimum °F (°C)	18 (−8)	20 (−7)	26 (−3)	33 (1)	42 (6)	51 (11)	57 (14)	55 (13)	47 (8)	35 (2)	26 (−3)	17 (−8)	36 (2)
Record low °F (°C)	−32 (−36)	−24 (−31)	−14 (−26)	−7 (−22)	17 (−8)	30 (−1)	41 (5)	36 (2)	15 (−9)	−2 (−19)	−14 (−26)	−27 (−33)	−32 (−36)
Average precipitation inches (mm)	0.49 (12)	0.47 (12)	1.50 (38)	2.08 (53)	2.85 (72)	2.00 (51)	2.46 (62)	2.05 (52)	1.44 (37)	1.03 (26)	1.18 (30)	0.65 (17)	18.20 (462)
Source: Weather.com

== Demographics ==
Historical population
Census	Pop.	Note	%±
1900	202		—
1910	679		236.1%
1920	983		44.8%
1930	2,295		133.5%
1940	3,437		49.8%
1950	11,421		232.3%
1960	48,548		325.1%
1970	74,974		54.4%
1980	158,588		111.5%
1990	222,103		40.1%
2000	276,393		24.4%
2010	325,078		17.6%
2020	386,261		18.8%
2025 (est.)	410,053	▲	6.2%
U.S. Decennial census

=== 2020 census ===
Aurora, Colorado – Racial and ethnic composition Note: the US Census treats Hispanic/Latino as an ethnic category. This table excludes Latinos from the racial categories and assigns them to a separate category. Hispanics/Latinos may be of any race.
Race / Ethnicity (NH = Non-Hispanic)	Pop 2000	Pop 2010	Pop 2020	% 2000	% 2010	% 2020
White alone (NH)	163,599	153,715	160,950	59.19%	47.29%	41.67%
Black or African American alone (NH)	36,008	49,003	59,232	13.03%	15.07%	15.33%
Native American or Alaska Native alone (NH)	1,511	1,487	1,679	0.55%	0.46%	0.43%
Asian alone (NH)	11,892	15,735	24,480	4.30%	4.84%	6.34%
Pacific Islander alone (NH)	458	919	1,549	0.17%	0.28%	0.40%
Some Other Race alone (NH)	495	677	2,213	0.18%	0.21%	0.57%
Mixed Race or Multi-Racial (NH)	7,666	10,279	19,256	2.77%	3.16%	4.99%
Hispanic or Latino (any race)	54,764	93,263	116,902	19.81%	28.69%	30.27%
Total	276,393	325,078	386,261	100.00%	100.00%	100.00%

As of the 2010 census, there were 325,078 people, 121,191 households, and 73,036 families residing in the city. The population density was 1,939.6 inhabitants per square mile (748.9/km^{2}). There were 131,040 housing units at an average density of 766.7 units per square mile (296.0 units/km^{2}). The racial makeup of the city was 61.1% White, 15.7% African American, 4.9% Asian (1.1% Korean, 0.8% Vietnamese, 0.5% Filipino, 0.5% Chinese, 0.5% Indian, 0.2% Japanese, 0.1% Thai, 0.1% Cambodian, 0.1% Burmese, 0.1% Nepalese, 0.1% Pakistani, 0.1% Indonesian), 1.0% Native American, 0.3% Pacific Islander, 11.6% from other races, and 5.2% from two or more races. Hispanic or Latino of any race were 28.7% of the population; 21.9% of Aurora's population is of Mexican heritage, 1.0% Salvadoran, 0.7% Puerto Rican, 0.4% Guatemalan, 0.3% Honduran, 0.3% Peruvian, 0.2% Cuban, 0.2% Colombian and 0.1% Nicaraguan. Non-Hispanic Whites were 47.3% of the population in 2010, compared to 85.1% in 1980.

Aurora is a center of Colorado's refugee population. There are about 30,000 Ethiopians and Eritreans living in the Denver–Aurora area. There is also a sizable population of Nepalese refugees.

There were 121,191 households, out of which 35.5% had children under the age of 18 living with them, 46.9% were married couples living together, 13.1% had a female householder with no husband present, and 34.8% were non-families. 27.4% of all households were made up of individuals, and 5.7% had someone living alone who was 65 years of age or older. The average household size was 2.6 and the average family size was 3.2.

In the city, the population was spread out, with 27.3% under the age of 18, 6.8% from 18 to 24, 37.6% from 25 to 44, 16.8% from 45 to 64, and 8.9% who were 65 years of age or older. The median age was 32 years. For every 100 females, there were 100.5 males. For every 100 females age 18 and over, there were 95.8 males.

The median income for a household in the city was $46,507, and the median income for a family was $52,551. Males had a median income of $35,963 versus $30,080 for females. The per capita income for the city was $21,095. About 6.8% of families and 8.9% of the population were below the poverty line, including 12.0% of those under age 18 and 6.1% of those age 65 or over.

== Economy ==
According to the Aurora Economic Development Council, the largest public employers in the city are:

#	Employer	Employees
1	Buckley Space Force Base	12,100
2	Anschutz Medical Campus	6,360
3	University of Colorado Hospital	4,050
4	Aurora Public Schools	4,020
5	Cherry Creek Schools	3,820
6	City of Aurora	3,740
7	Community College of Aurora	510

According to the Aurora Economic Development Council, the largest private employers in the city of Aurora are:

#	Employer	Employees
1	Children's Hospital Colorado	5,670
2	Raytheon Technologies	2,430
3	Kaiser Permanente	1,940
4	The Medical Center of Aurora	1,710
5	Amazon	1,500
6	24-7 Intouch	1,350
7	SROriginals	870
8	Tyco Integrated Security	850
9	Northrop Grumman	750
10	ADT Inc.	700

Other notable employers in the city include Lockheed Martin Corporation, Staples Inc., United Natural Foods, Aurora Mental Health Center, G45 Secure Solutions, Graebel Relocation, Core-Mark, and Nelnet, Inc.

== Attractions ==
The city of Aurora manages more than 100 parks, more than 6,000 acres (24 km^{2}) of open space and natural areas, and six award-winning municipal golf courses (Aurora Hills, Meadow Hills, Murphy Creek, Saddle Rock, Springhill and Fitzsimons). Aurora also is home to several privately owned golf courses including CommonGround Golf Course, Heather Ridge Country Club, Heritage Eagle Bend Golf Club and Valley Country Club. Hogan Park at Highlands Creek in the Aurora Highlands features world-class public art installations, including Liberty, among the 20 tallest statues in the United States.

Star K Ranch, home to Aurora's Morrison Nature Center, provides important habitat for wildlife. It has several trails for nature exploration, including access to the Sand Creek Greenway Trail. Jewell Wetland, a 50-acre (200,000 m^{2}) wooded wetland, features trails, boardwalk/deck access into the wetland and a butterfly garden. Aurora Reservoir and Quincy Reservoir offer plenty of opportunities for outdoor water pursuits.

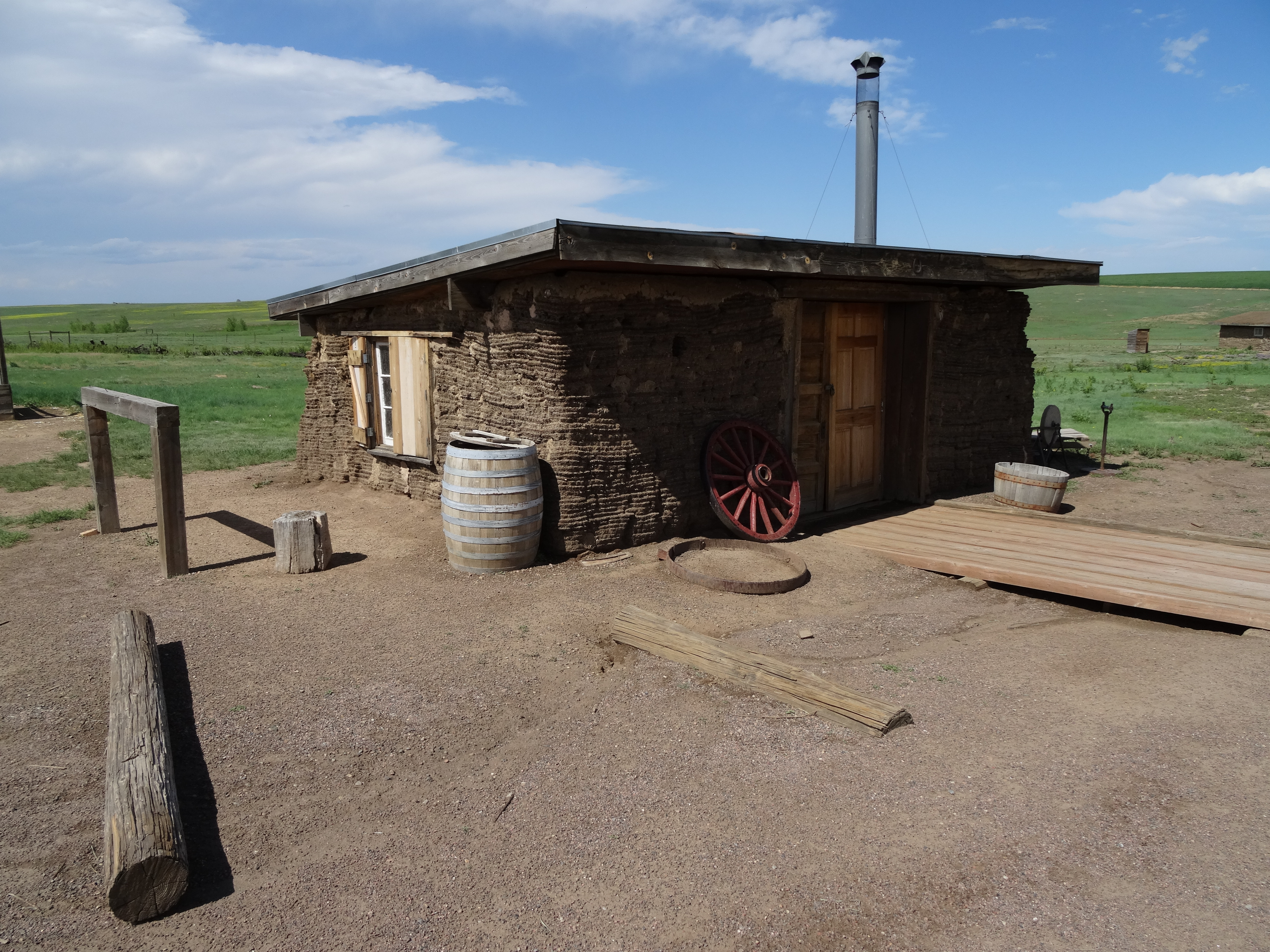
Sod house at the Plains Conservation Center

DeLaney Farm, site of Aurora's famous historic round barn, has 130 acres (0.53 km^{2}) of open space, trails with access to the High Line Canal, an organic garden managed by Denver Urban Gardens, and two structures on the National Register of Historic Places. The Plains Conservation Center, with 1,100 acres (4.5 km^{2}) of native shortgrass prairie, hosts a variety of educational programs.

Twenty-seven historic sites and landmarks are managed by the city of Aurora, including the Gully Homestead of 1870, the Victorian-style Centennial House of 1890, the privately owned American War Mothers National Memorial Home, the Art Deco-style KOA Building of 1934, the DeLaney Round Barn of 1902, Lowry Building 800, the interim headquarters for the U.S. Air Force Academy from 1955 to 1958, and Stanley Marketplace, which opened at the former site of Stanley Aviation in 2016.

The Aurora Fox Theatre & Arts Center, another historic landmark, is a 245-seat performing arts facility in the Aurora Cultural Arts District, along East Colfax Avenue. In that same area, The People's Building is a performing arts venue with flexible space, including 191 retractable seats and a gallery.

The Aurora History Museum is a community-based cultural center featuring a permanent exhibit on Aurora history and two changing exhibit galleries touching on topics related to history and decorative arts. Additionally, some of their collections can be accessed online here. Aurora is home to the Colorado Freedom Memorial and a memorial garden for the victims of the 2012 theater shooting is located adjacent to City Hall.

The Aurora Symphony Orchestra, a community orchestra established in 1978, offers a full season of full orchestra concerts annually as well as smaller chamber ensemble performances.

The Aurora Public Library provides four main branches and a variety of events throughout the year.

Mershops Town Center at Aurora is the city's centrally located indoor shopping mall. Other major retail centers in Aurora include the outdoor The Gardens on Havana (formerly Buckingham Square) and Southlands Town Center, which is the metro area's largest. Stanley Marketplace is a non-traditional retail and entertainment venue occupying the former Stanley Aviation plant.

== Government ==
The city of Aurora operates under a council-manager form of government, where the city manager runs the city's day-to-day operations with general guidance from the city council. The Aurora City Council is composed of a mayor and ten council members. Six members are elected from districts, while the other four are elected at large. The mayor is elected by the entire city. Aurora's mayor role is largely ceremonial, but the mayor does have direct impact on policy issues as the head of city council. The council is nonpartisan; however, parties of members have been listed below for reference.

Aurora City Council members
District	Officeholder	Political party
Mayor	Mike Coffman	Republican
At-Large	Alli Jackson	Democratic
At-Large	Rob Andrews	Democratic
At-Large	Alison Coombs	Democratic
At-Large	Curtis Gardner	Republican
Ward I	Gianina Horton	Democratic
Ward II	Amy Wiles	Democratic
Ward III	Ruben Medina	Democratic
Ward IV	Stephanie Hancock	Republican
Ward V	Angela Lawson	Nonpartisan
Ward VI	Francoise Bergan	Republican

This full-service city is protected by the Aurora Police Department, one of only 10 law enforcement agencies in Colorado to be accredited by the Commission on Accreditation for Law Enforcement Agencies; the Aurora Fire Department, which is accredited by the Commission on Fire Accreditation International; and a Public Safety Communications dispatch call center. The Aurora Municipal Courts handles a wide variety of offense violations, and the Aurora Detention Center is a 72-hour adult holding facility.

=== Politics ===
In national elections, Aurora leans to the left and the Democratic Party, though not as much as neighboring Denver but more than other suburbs in the Denver metro area. Northern and Central Aurora, due to an extremely racially and culturally diverse voter base and high density for a suburban city, are some of the most Democratic areas in Colorado and vote similarly to Denver and Boulder; southern Aurora, similar to neighboring Centennial, used to lean Republican but has swung Democratic entering the 2020s.

Aurora anchors Colorado's 6th congressional district and is represented in Congress by Jason Crow (D-Centennial). State representation is listed in the tables below (areas implied to be in Arapahoe County unless noted: not all districts are fully in Aurora).

==== Colorado State Representatives ====
District	Name	Party	Area Represented
District 30	Dafna Michaelson Jenet	Democratic	North Aurora (Adams County)
District 36	Michael Carter	Democratic	Eastern Aurora
District 37	Tom Sullivan	Democratic	Southeastern Aurora
District 39	Mark Baisley	Republican	Southern Aurora (Douglas County)
District 40	Naquetta Ricks	Democratic	South-central Aurora
District 41	Iman Jodeh	Democratic	Central Aurora
District 42	Mandy Lindsay	Democratic	North-central Aurora
District 44	Kim Ransom	Republican	Southern Aurora (Douglas County)
District 56	Rod Bockenfeld	Republican	Eastern Aurora (Adams and Arapahoe Counties)

==== Colorado State Senators ====
District	Name	Party	Area represented
District 4	Jim Smallwood	Republican	Southern Aurora (Douglas County)
District 25	Kevin Priola	Democratic (Note: Kevin Priola was elected as a Republican, and crossed the floor to the Democratic Party in 2022.)	Northern Aurora (Adams County)
District 26	Jeff Bridges	Democratic	South-central Aurora
District 27	Chris Kolker	Democratic	Southeastern Aurora
District 28	Janet Buckner	Democratic	South-central Aurora
District 29	Rhonda Fields	Democratic	North-central Aurora

=== List of mayors ===
List of mayors of Fletcher and Aurora
Name	Period served	Notes
H. M. Miliken	May 27, 1891 – May 1, 1894	
A. L. B. Davies	May 2, 1894 – April 2, 1895	
P. H. Chambers	April 3, 1895 – April 15, 1898	
W. A. Clundy	April 16, 1898 – April 8, 1899	
W. H. Murphy	April 9, 1899 – April 12, 1901	
Jonas Washburn	April 13, 1901 – April 6, 1903	
Harry S. Class	April 7, 1903 – April 14, 1904	
Louis M. Strauss	April 15, 1904 – April 2, 1905	
Wilmer J. Parker	April 13, 1905 – April 10, 1906	Resigned
Andrew Thompson	April 16, 1906 – April 14, 1907	Last mayor of Fletcher
Edwin G. Smith	April 15, 1907 – April 12, 1908	First mayor of Aurora
A. H. Kramer	April 13, 1908 – April 13, 1910	
V. T. O'Donald	April 14, 1910 – April 17, 1911	
Gershom Jones	April 18, 1911 – April 13, 1914	
H. B. Thompson	April 14, 1914 – April 12, 1917	
George E. Smith	April 13, 1917 – December 7, 1917	Resigned
Harry Katherman	December 8, 1917 – July 1, 1918	Mayor pro tem
John McMillan	July 1, 1918 – May 4, 1919	
J. N. Trompen	May 5, 1919 – April 21, 1920	
Jasper Parrish	April 22, 1920 – April 14, 1921	
John McMillan	April 15, 1921 – April 11, 1926	
F. A. Harrison	April 12, 1926 – April 10, 1927	
E S. Murphy	April 11, 1927 – April 24, 1929	
B. B. Nevius	April 25, 1929 – April 12, 1931	
Charles F. Holzer	April 13, 1931 – April 6, 1937	
W. J. Parrish	April 7, 1937 – April 6, 1941	
J. E. McWhorter	April 7, 1941 – January 11, 1943	Resigned
A. O. Hill	January 13, 1943 – April 8, 1945	Appointed January 13, 1943, elected April 12, 1943
B. T. Howard	April 9, 1945 – January 11, 1948	
C. E. Tupps	January 12, 1948 – November 8, 1953	
William B. Mansfield	November 9, 1953 – November 6, 1955	
Allen C. Bradly	November 7, 1955 – November 8, 1959	
Harry W. Allard	November 9, 1959 – November 11, 1963	
Robert W. Fennig	November 12, 1963 – November 7, 1965	
Norma O. Walker	November 8, 1965 – November 12, 1967	First female mayor
Paul C. Beck	November 13, 1967 – December 8, 1974	
William R. Dominguez	December 9, 1974 – November 9, 1975	
Fred H. Hood	November 10, 1975 – November 5, 1979	
Dennis Champine	November 6, 1979 – November 3, 1987	
Paul Tauer	November 4, 1987 – November 4, 2003	
Edward J. Tauer	November 5, 2003 – November 13, 2011	
Steve Hogan	November 14, 2011 – May 13, 2018	
Bob LeGare	June 25, 2018 – December 1, 2019	
Mike Coffman	December 2, 2019 – present	

== Education ==
Primary and secondary education school districts:

- Aurora Public Schools (Adams-Arapahoe School District 28J)
- Bennett School District 29-J
- School District 27J (Brighton Public Schools) (The Highpoint at DIA neighborhood is located in this district)
- Cherry Creek Public Schools
- Douglas County School District (includes all areas in Douglas County: The Inspiration neighborhood is located within this district)

Charter schools:

- DSST Public Schools

Private schools:

- Christ Our Redeemer Lutheran School
- Merryhill Preschool

Post-secondary and career education:

- University of Colorado Anschutz Medical Campus
- Columbia College–Aurora
- Community College of Aurora
- Pickens Technical College
- Colorado School of Holistic and Naturopathic Studies
- Colorado Technical University–Denver South Campus
- Concorde Career College
- Platt College

== Transportation ==
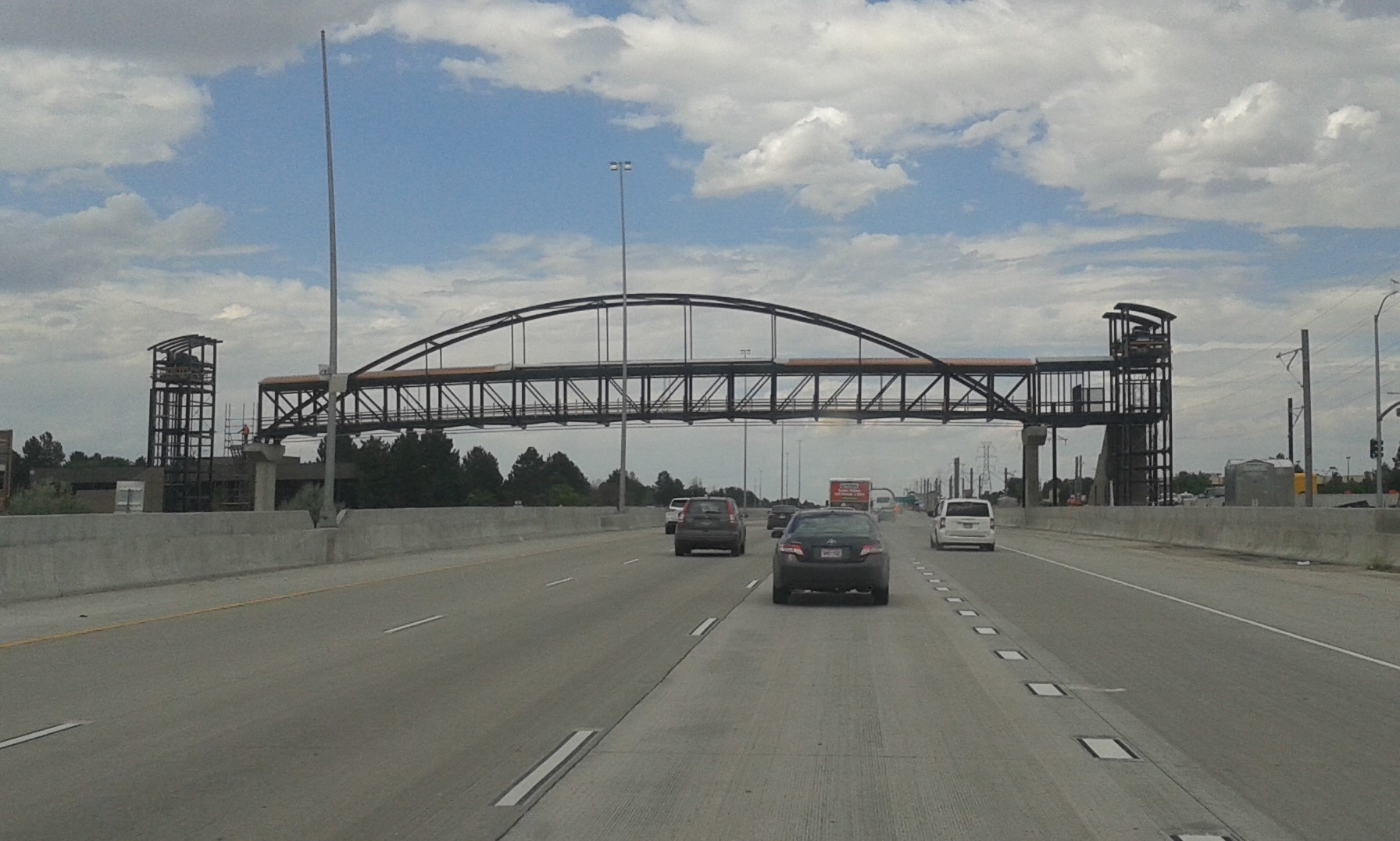
Florida Station pedestrian bridge over Interstate 225

Aurora straddles I-70, I-225 and the E-470 beltway. The Regional Transportation District's light rail transit system was extended to serve the southwestern edge of Aurora on November 17, 2006. The H Line stops at Aurora's Dayton and Nine Mile Stations; a comprehensive network of feeder buses in southern Aurora serve the latter. On February 24, 2017, the line was extended as the R Line to Peoria Station in the city's northwest, where riders may transfer to the A Line providing service between Union Station in Downtown Denver and Denver Airport. Much of Aurora is more convenient to Denver International Airport than Denver itself, and the city is planning an Aerotropolis along the airport's southern flank. This proximity is a factor in the expected growth of the E-470 corridor directly south of Denver International Airport, projected to eventually accommodate 250,000 additional Aurora residents. The easternmost portions of Aurora adjoin the Colorado Air and Space Port.

In 2017, Aurora became the first city in Colorado to host a dockless bike sharing program, but operations have been suspended since August 2022.

== Sports ==
In 2014 the U.S.A. Powerlifting Raw Nationals and the IPF Open Powerlifting World Championships were both held in Aurora. The WC was the 35th Women's and 44th Men's Open Powerlifting Championships, and it was held on the Radisson Hotel Denver Southeast.

== Sister cities ==
Aurora's sister cities are:

- Adama, Ethiopia (1988–2004, since 2014) (Note: After Aurora Sister Cities International was resurrected in 2013.)
- Chihuahua, Mexico (2023)
- Jacó, Costa Rica (2016)
- Seongnam, South Korea (1992)

=== Friendship cities ===
Aurora also has two friendship cities:

- Antiguo Cuscatlán, El Salvador (2016)
- New Taipei City, Taiwan (2023)

== See also ==
- Denver-Aurora-Centennial, CO Metropolitan Statistical Area
- Denver-Aurora-Greeley, CO Combined Statistical Area
- Front Range Urban Corridor
