= Aurora Public Library (Colorado) =

- 39°42′37.08″N 104°48′54.29″W
- Location: 14949 E Alameda Pkwy; Aurora, Colorado, 80012, United States
- Type: Public library
- Established: February 10, 1929
- Branches: 7

Collection
- Size: 439,120

Access and use
- Circulation: 1,570,916
- Population served: 404,219
- Members: 199,291

Other information
- Director: Ginger White Brunetti
- Employees: 89
- Website: www.auroralibrary.org

The Aurora Public Library in Aurora, Colorado is a multi-branch library district serving the Aurora suburb of Denver, Colorado. It complements Denver Public Library, which serves the Denver city and county, as well as the Arapahoe Library District, which serves Arapahoe County. The Aurora Public Library predates its county library district, Arapahoe, by more than thirty years, while serving the more niche population of Aurora.

== Overview ==
The first Aurora Public Library, opened in 1929

In 1925, the Aurora Women's Club began raising money to finance the opening of Aurora's first public library. The grassroots effort led to the opening of the first branch of the Aurora Public Library in 1929. The Aurora City Council recognized the library in October of that year, and has supported the library since.

In 2009, the City of Aurora shut down several libraries due to a budget initiative failure, which left the system unable to fund all operating branches. The closure of the Mission Viejo library led to a lawsuit between the Mission Viejo subdivision, which had a prior agreement with the City of Aurora to keep the branch open for 50 years, beginning in 1973.

After two years of closure, the Mission Viejo branch was reopened with limited hours. The city maintained that the closure of the library met all legal requirements for closure. Following the lawsuit, a temporary settlement was reached between the city and the homeowners association, leaving the library in an interim state until a tax initiative was passed. The initiative would either fund the library for continued operation, or let the original lawsuit continue. In December 2011, rather than issuing a 90-day notice to close the library again, the City of Aurora scheduled a study session to discuss the library. Following the session, Aurora agreed to keep the library open until at least August 10, 2025.

After opening a PC center in Kmart in June 2013, the Aurora Public Library PC center was awarded the "Top Innovator" award for the placement, availability, and quality of service provided by the PC center. Due to the substantial amount of traffic and recognition, hours were expanded to seven days a week shortly thereafter.

In October 2013, FEMA classified the central branch of the Aurora Public Library as a disaster recovery center, to help with disaster recovery for severe weather and flooding.

== Services ==
The Aurora Public Library has seven locations, all of which provide hard-copy books, periodicals, audio CDs, DVDs, internet, and database access. A new bookmobile was also launched in 2023.

In addition to traditional library services, the Aurora Public Library offers events, including story-time, baby dance, and a summer-reading program.
