= Platt College =

Platt College may refer to:

- Platt College (Colorado), a vocational school in Aurora, Colorado
- Platt College (San Diego), a design school in San Diego, California
