= Mission Viejo (disambiguation) =

Mission Viejo may refer to two communities in the United States built by the same developer:

- Mission Viejo, California, a city in southern Orange County, California
- Mission Viejo, Aurora, Colorado, a neighborhood in Aurora, Colorado

Although Mission Viejo means Old Mission in Spanish, the term is grammatically incorrect. Because mission is a feminine noun in Spanish, the adjective should also be feminine. The correct term would be Mission Vieja.
