= Southlands (Aurora, Colorado) =

Shopping mall in Aurora, Colorado, United States

Southlands Lifestyle Center
- Location: Aurora, Colorado, U.S.
- Coordinates: 39°36′16″N 104°42′26″W
- Opened: 2005
- Manager: M & J Wilkow Ltd.
- Num. of stores: 189 (May 2009)
- Num. of anchor tenants: 16 (additional sub-anchors)
- Floor area: 1,700,000 sq ft (160,000 m^{2})
- Floors: 2 (on Main Street--1 elsewhere)
- Parking: Surface lots and street parking (on Main Street)
- Website: shopsouthlands.com

Southlands Lifestyle Center (also Southlands Mall, Southlands, The Southlands, or The Southlands at Aurora) is a regional shopping mall located in Aurora, Colorado. The center is located at the intersection of Smoky Hill Road and the E-470 tollway, about 15 miles south of Denver International Airport, east of the Saddle Rock neighborhood and west of Cherokee Trail High School and the Tallyn's Reach neighborhood.

Based on retail floor space, Southlands is the largest non-enclosed mall in the United States. It opened in 2005, featuring a unique design incorporating a "Main Street" of shops and smaller eateries, surrounded by larger stores near the perimeter of the center. Currently there are about 40 vacant retail locations on Main Street. In March 2018, the property was purchased by M & J Wilkow Ltd. and MetLife Investment Management.

== Design ==
Southlands Lifestyle Center utilizes an open-aired, Mainstreet style central shopping area which is ideally suited for Colorado's moderate climate. Main street runs down the center of the mall and is lined with shops and eateries. The street is adorned with hanging plants and planter boxes and angled parking spaces on both sides. There are stores in each of the 10 blocks on the ground floor, and four of the blocks have additional stores and office space on a second floor. At the end of Main Street is a central plaza where seasonal events take place. During the spring and summer a jumping fountain is active. While in the winter, an ice rink is constructed for public skating. Often there are events such as concerts in the fountain area (although the water is temporarily shut off). During the holiday season there is a large Christmas tree. Other holiday festivities include horse-drawn carriage rides, Santa visits, and caroling. The opposite end of the plaza features a 16-screen movie theater, owned by AMC Theatres.

== Stores ==
The center's anchor stores are Walmart and JCPenney with dozens of junior anchors including Sam's Club, Barnes & Noble, Petco, Michaels and others. Main Street is mostly lined with apparel stores, including Torrid, H&M and Victoria's Secret. Other stores include Claire's and Bath & Body Works.

== June 2009 tornado ==
On June 7, 2009, at around 1:30 pm MDT the National Weather Service in Boulder indicated that a severe thunderstorm was coming into the southeastern Denver/Aurora area. At 1:53 pm MDT, the supercell had produced a tornado which touched down near the Southlands complex. The EF2 tornado damaged surrounding houses and some landscape was destroyed. Damaged stores include the Red Brick Pizza restaurant (which was nearly destroyed), the JCPenney store, Jamba Juice, and Lowes. No injuries were reported from the incident. The complex was closed due to damage from the afternoon on Sunday June 7 until around noon on Tuesday June 9 although some stores, like Del Taco and Sam's Club, reopened the next day.

== Gallery ==
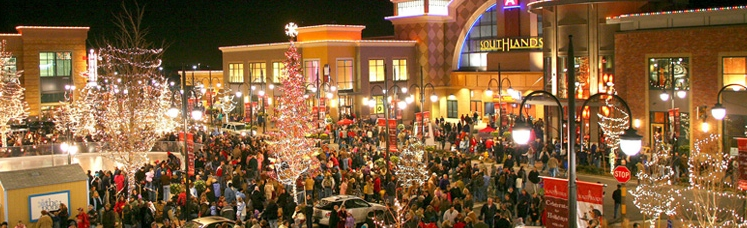
Main plaza at Southlands

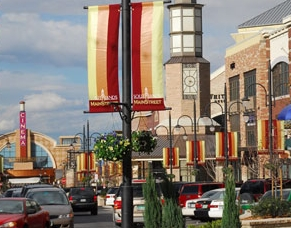
Half view of Main Street

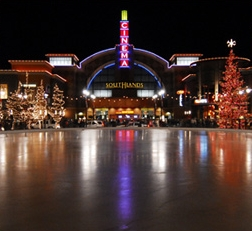
Ice rink at main plaza
