= Plains Conservation Center =

Park in Aurora, Colorado, U.S.

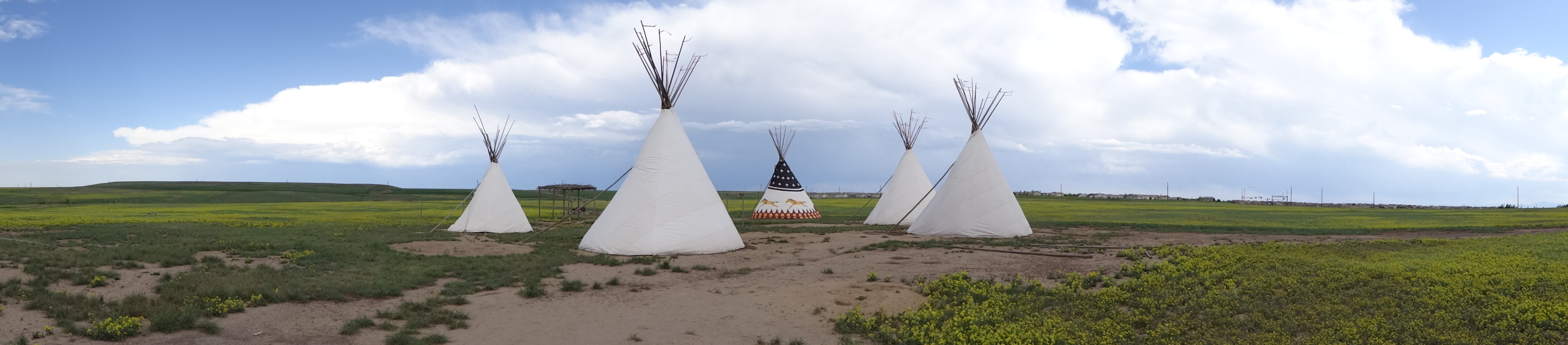
- View of Cheyenne Camp looking east at the Plains Conservation Center
- Interactive map of Plains Conservation Center
- Type: History museum and nature preserve
- Location: 21901 E Hampden Av; Aurora, Colorado
- Coordinates: 39.65604°N 104.73700°W
- Area: 1,100 acres (450 ha) in Aurora
- Created: 1949
- Website: AuroraGov.org

The Plains Conservation Center is an outdoor education center and state-designated natural area in Aurora, Colorado. The Aurora property is owned by the Aurora Parks, Recreation and Open Space department.

== History ==
The land that is currently part of the Aurora site was once part of the railroad. The city of Denver bought the land in 1933, and the land later became federal land managed by the Bureau of Land Management. An education center was established in 1949, and in 1969 a group of sod structures were built. In 1997 the West Arapahoe Conservation District sold 1,100 acres (4.5 km^{2}) to the City of Aurora; about 500 additional acres (2 km^{2}) were sold for private development, with revenue from the private sale used to buy the West Bijou Creek site in Strasburg. The Plains Conservation Center non-profit dissolved and the City of Aurora, already owning the land, assumed management of the site in 2017.

== Activities ==
The Aurora site features a replica homestead village that includes two houses, a school house, blacksmith shop and chicken coop, a replica tipi camp, and 1,000 acres of shortgrass prairie. Special seasonal events and education programs are offered through the City of Aurora's naturalist program and the Denver Botanic Gardens.

== Gallery ==
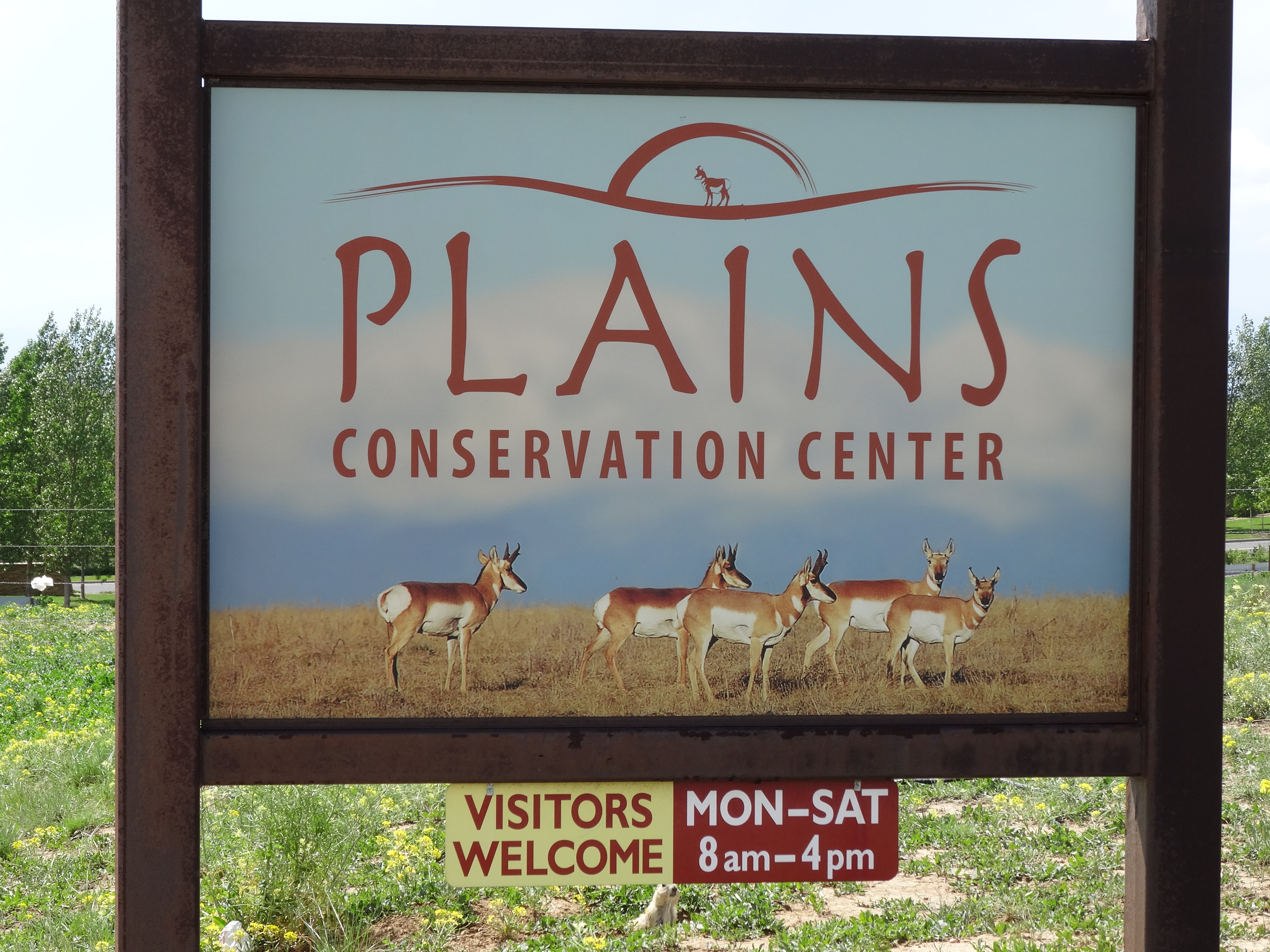
Entrance sign

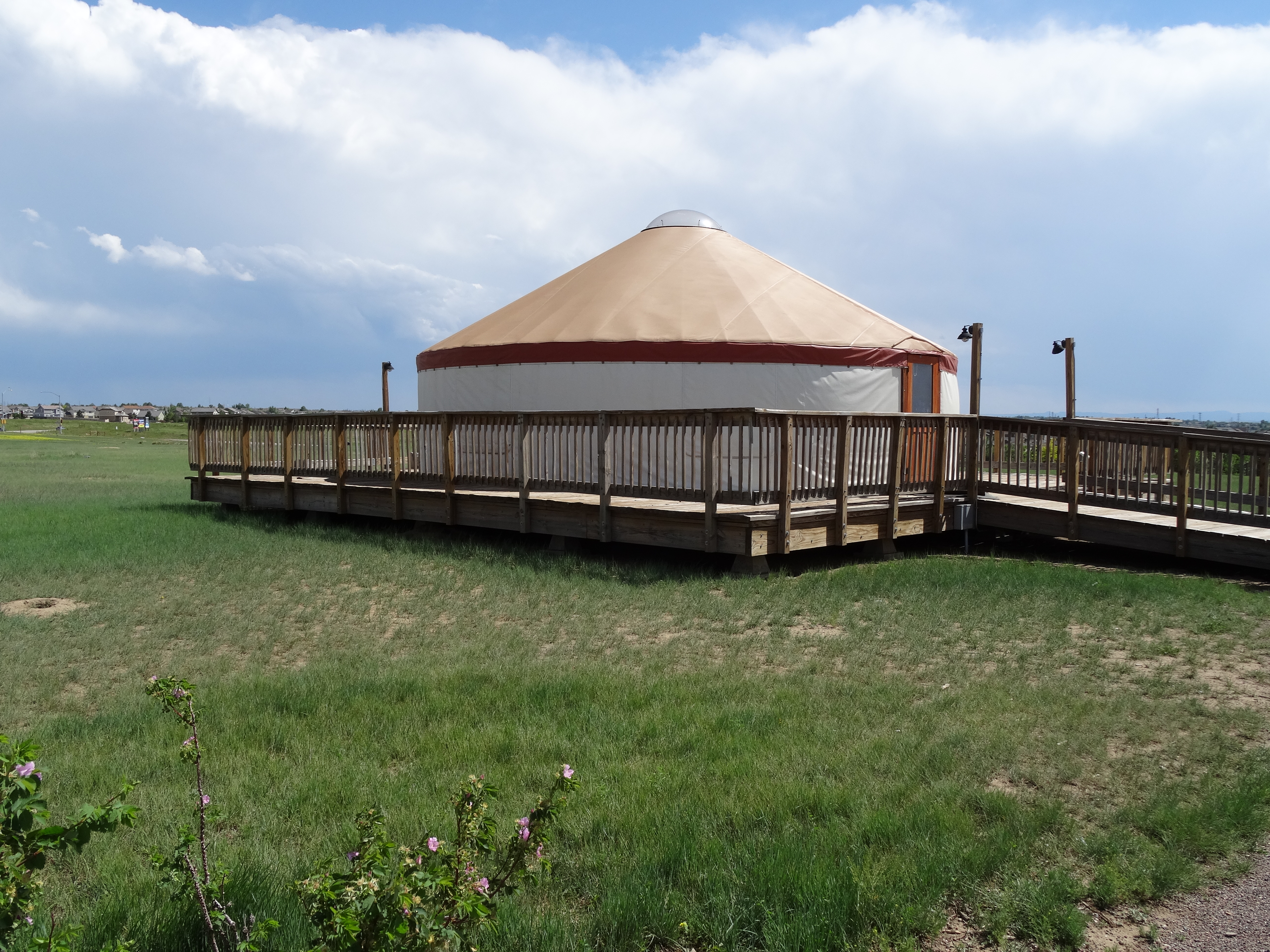
Yurt

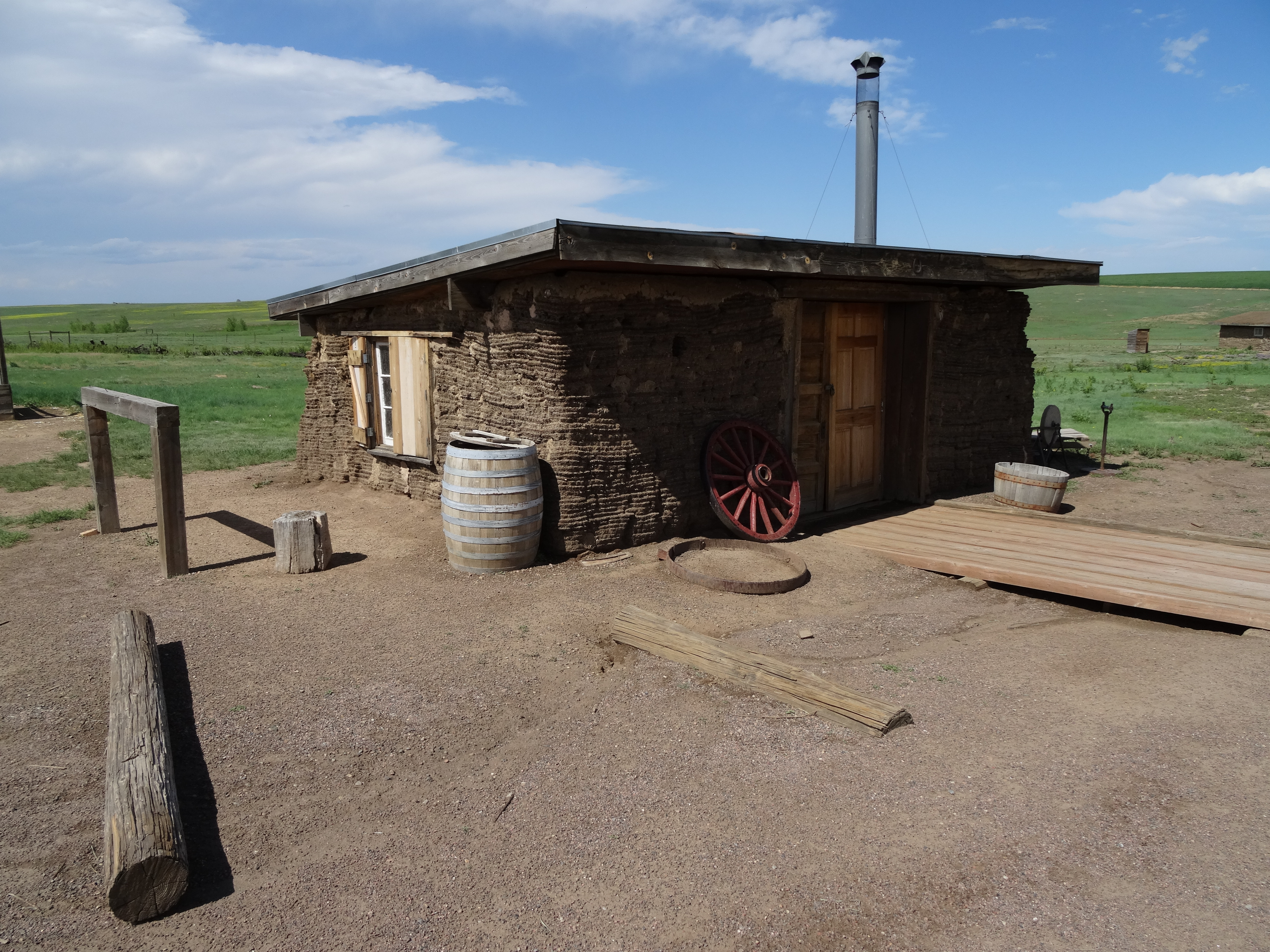
Sod House

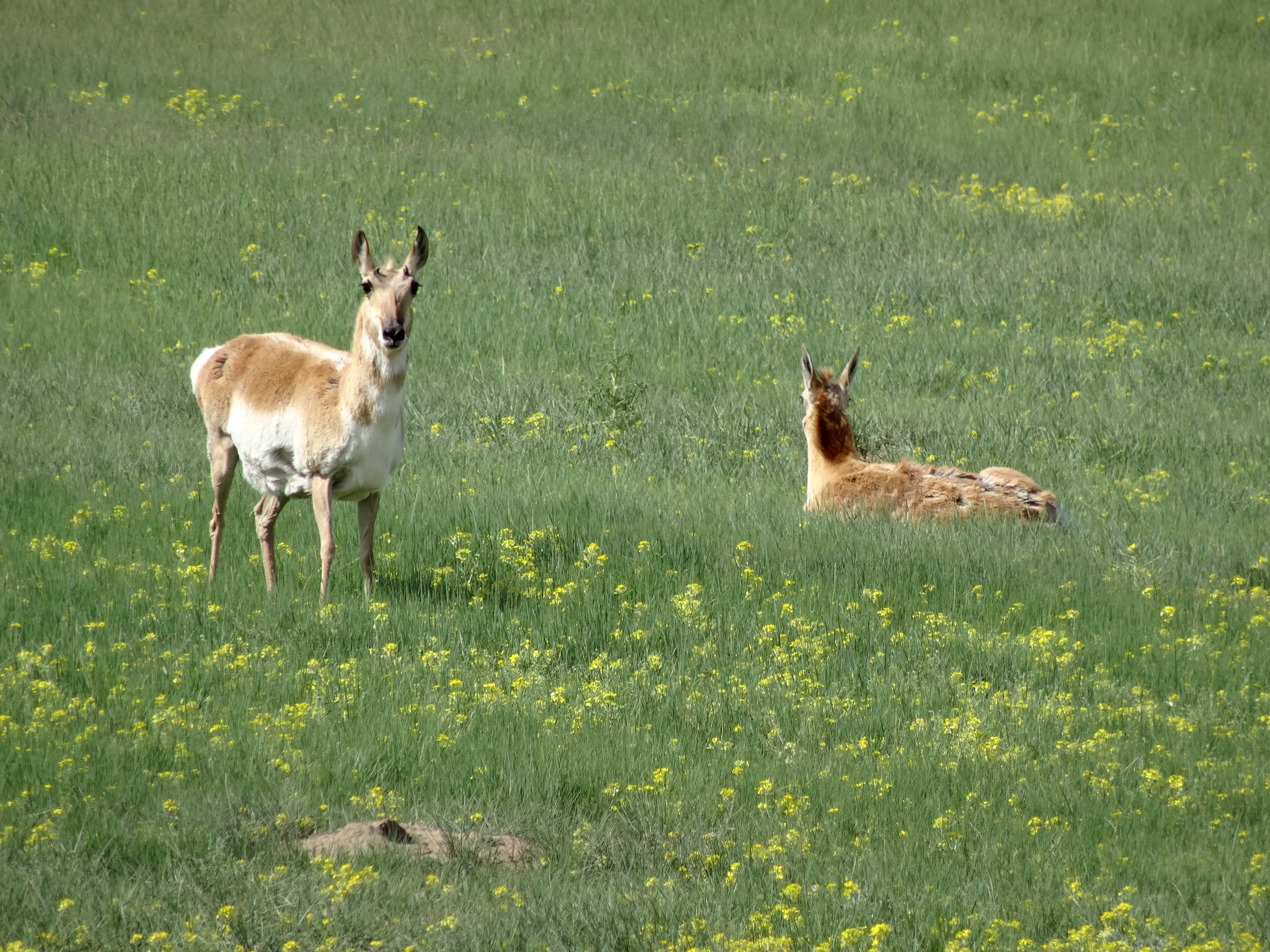
Pronghorn

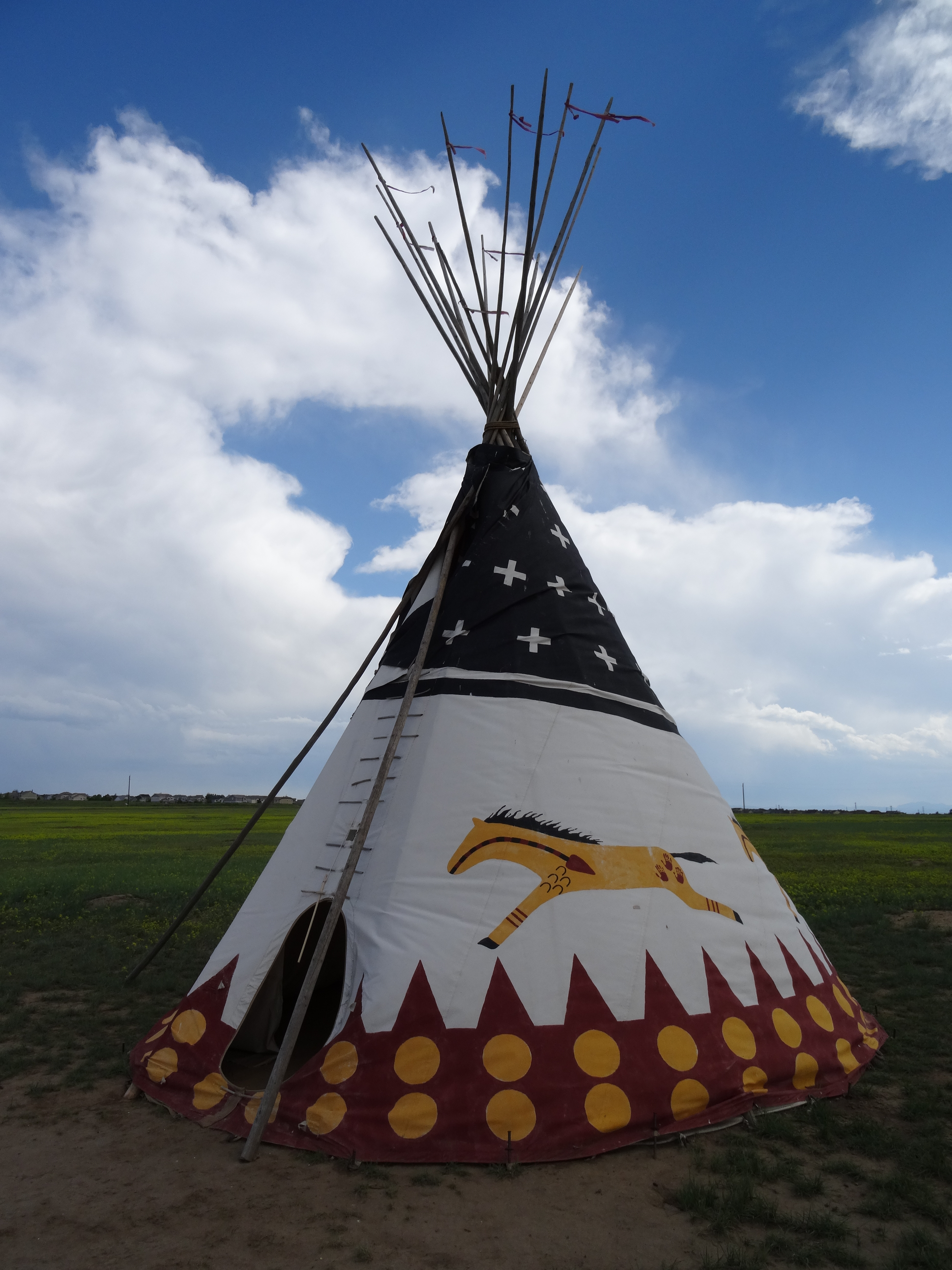
Tipi

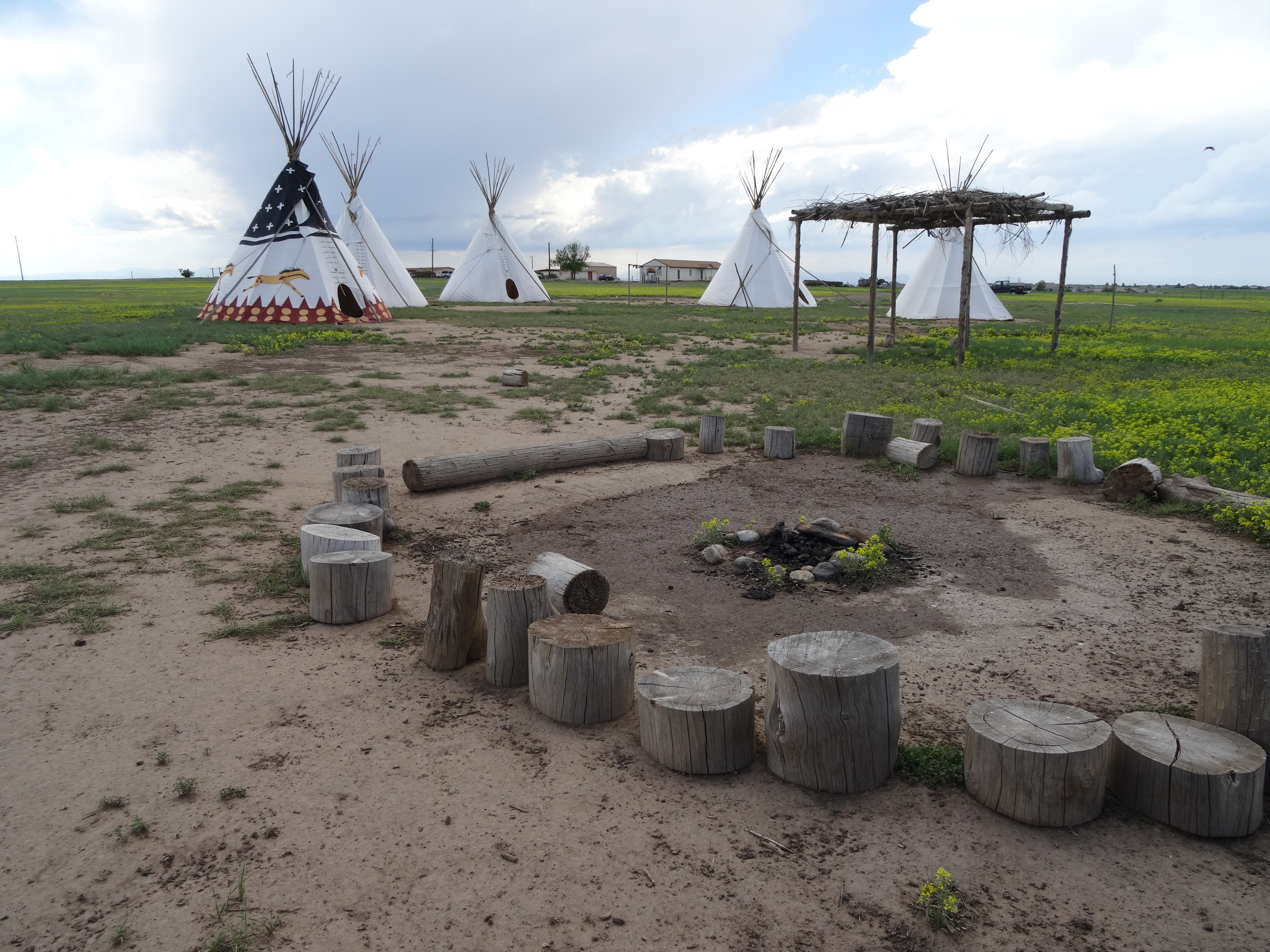
Cheyenne camp looking west

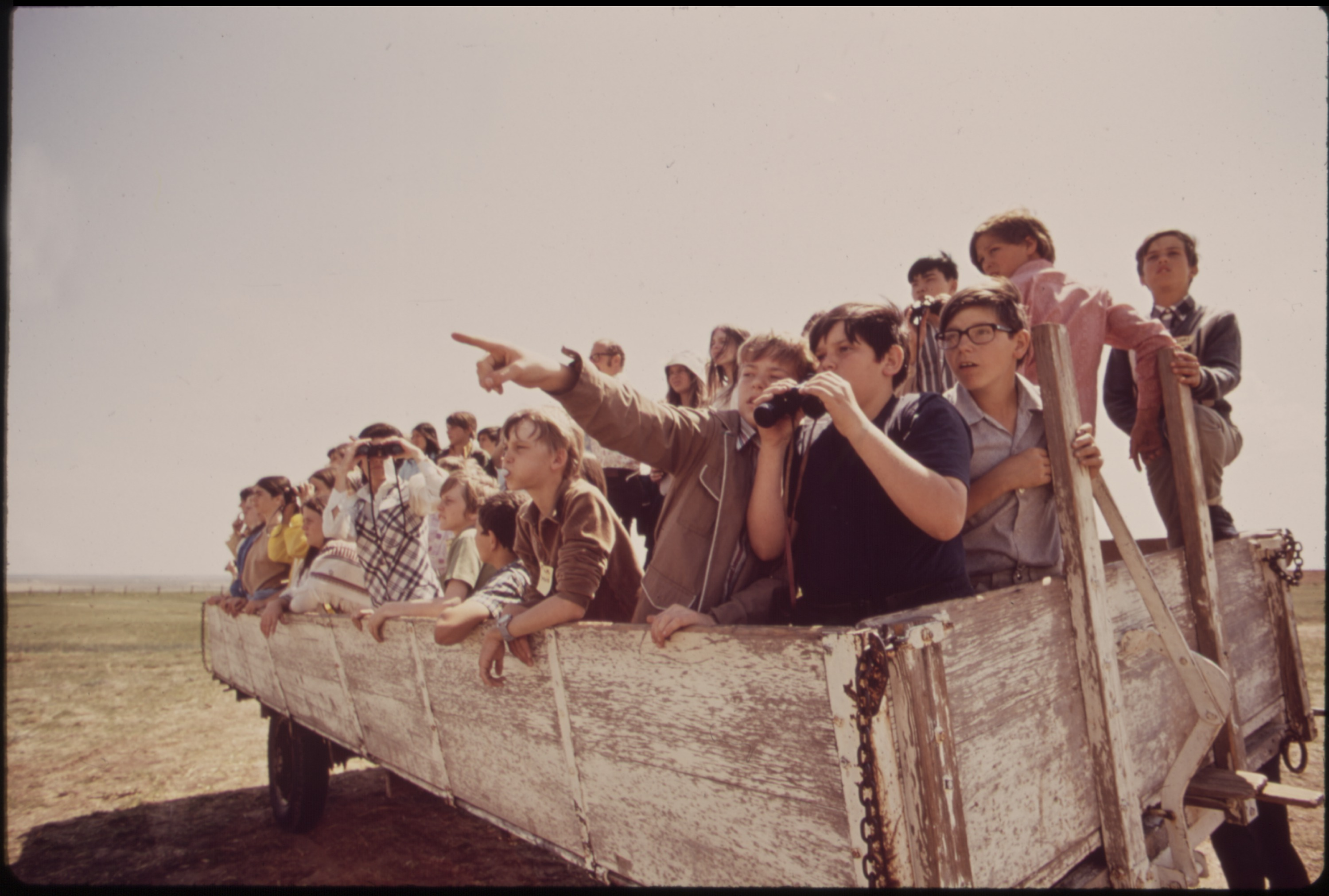
Students observe prairie dog colony

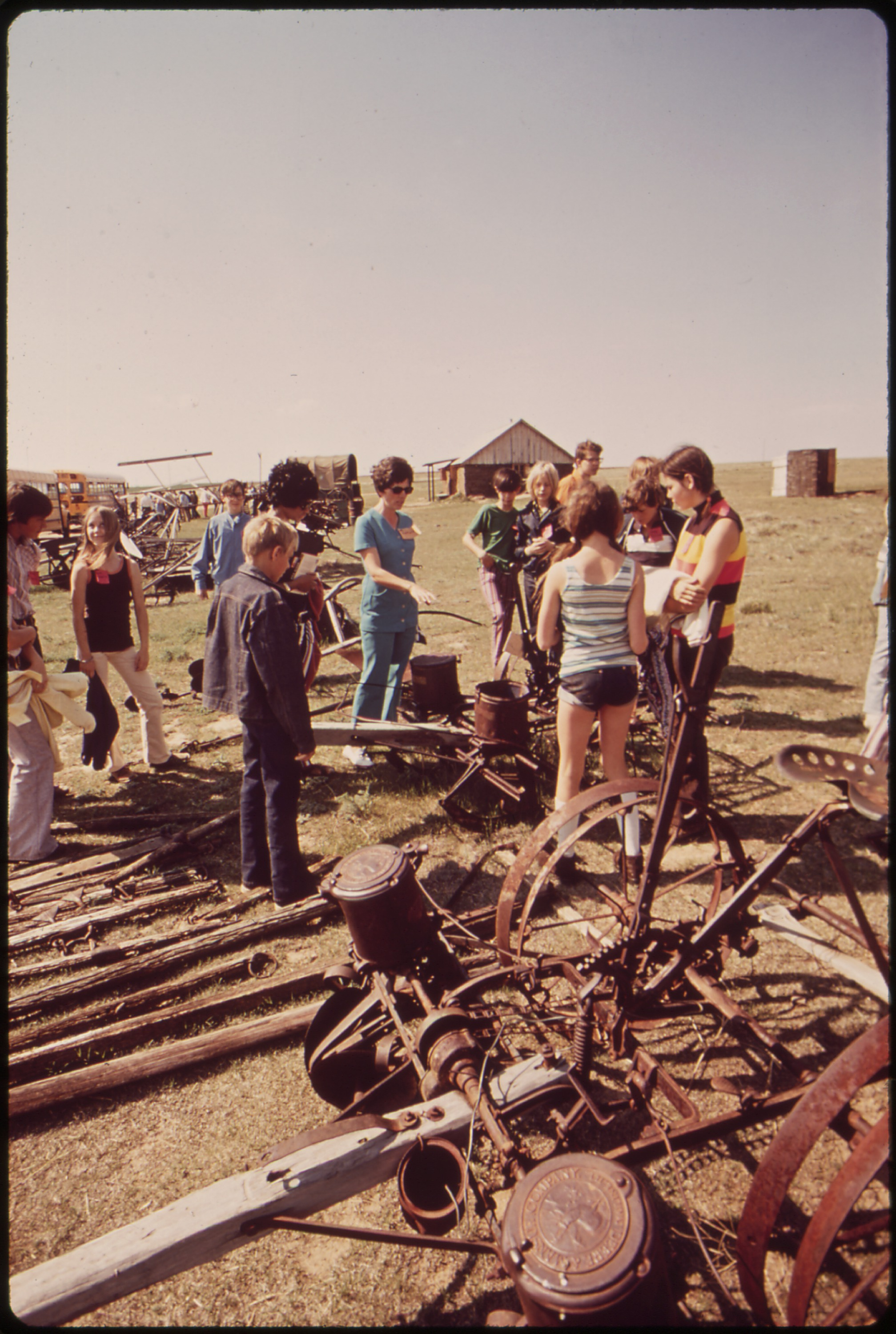
Students view farm equipment
