= Aurora Mental Health & Recovery =

Community mental health center in Aurora, Colorado

- Founded: 1975
- Type: Private, Nonprofit Community Mental Health Organization
- Headquarters: Aurora, Colorado
- Region served: City of Aurora
- Exec. Director/CEO: Kelly Phillips-Henry, PsyD, MBA, Chief Executive Officer
- Website: www.auroramhr.org

Aurora Mental Health & Recovery is a private, nonprofit community mental health center in Aurora, Colorado, which was founded in 1975. Originally named Aurora Mental Health Center, the organization went through a rebrand in January 2023.

The center serves more than 20,600 individuals, 39% of whom live below the federal poverty level and 21% of whom are uninsured.

Services are provided through 46 programs in 13 counseling centers, 10 residential facilities, 13 sites integrated with primary medical care, in public schools, through county human service departments, in criminal justice settings, in homes and foster homes, and at other community locations.

The Center responds to emergencies and crises through a walk-in crisis center, a Crisis Stabilization Unit, and through mobile crisis response in the community.

== See also ==
- Recovery model
