= Graebel Relocation =

American relocation company

Graebel Companies, Inc.
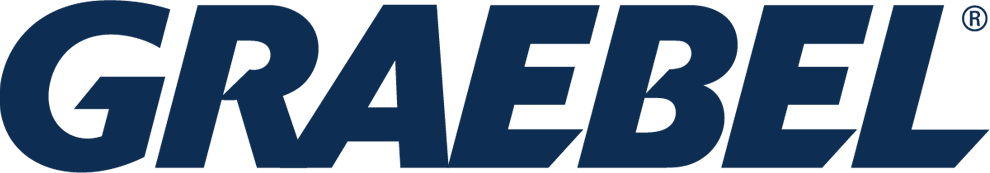
- Company type: Privately held company
- Industry: Relocation Management
- Founded: 1950
- Founder: David Graebel
- Headquarters: Aurora, Colorado United States
- Area served: Worldwide
- Services: Corporate Relocation, Employee Relocation, Relocation Strategy & Consulting
- Website: graebel.com

Graebel Companies, Inc., with global headquarters in Aurora, Colorado, is an American privately held company that provides corporate relocation services, offering end-to-end assignment management solutions, policy consulting, and administration of global mobility programs.

== History ==
The company was founded by David Graebel in 1950. The company started with one moving truck in Wausau, Wisconsin. David performed scheduling, driving, delivering, loading and unloading tasks at the beginning, and later branched out to offering services across the state of Wisconsin.

As years passed, the company started serving customers across the U.S. and became an independent van line company in the early 1980s. Around the same time, the company relocated its headquarters to Colorado.

By 1996, the company launched its relocation and assignment management services, and in 2008 it opened its first international satellite office in Prague.

In 2015, Graebel Companies, Inc., divested Graebel Van Lines to focus exclusively on workforce and commercial moving. Graebel Van Lines operated independently before shutting down in 2017.

In 2023, Graebel Companies, Inc. sold Graebel Commercial Services - its workplace and commercial services business unit - to Hilldrup, a family-owned moving, storage, relocation, and logistics company.
