= Norma O. Walker =

American politician (1928–2023)

Norma O. Walker (June 26, 1928 – September 8, 2023) was an American politician who was the mayor of Aurora, Colorado from 1965 to 1967. As of August 2025, Walker has been the only female mayor in that city's history. As mayor she is remembered for her work on stabilizing Aurora's water supply.

== Early life ==
Walker was born in Las Animas, Colorado, in 1928. Her father was a Norwegian immigrant, who encouraged her participation in politics.

== Mayor of Aurora ==
In 1965, Aurora was one of the fastest growing cities in the country, and Walker ran for mayor because she felt that the current government was adequately planning for that growth. She had been a member of the Board of Adjusting and Appeals before running for mayor.

She described her election victory as a "bit of a fluke." The incumbent mayor Bob Fennig became ill and withdrew from the race, and threw his support behind Walker.

On November 14, 1965, she appeared as a guest on the U.S. television game show What's My Line. It was the show's first episode without one of its regular panel members, journalist Dorothy Kilgallen (who had died six days earlier), and five days after the Northeast blackout of 1965.

She was one of the first female mayor of a major US city, but faced challenges due to gender bias. News reports frequently commented on her physical appearance, criticized for not spending time with her family, and she faced obstruction from the city council.

She lost re-election by a narrow margin. Later, she went on to serve on the National Highway Safety Advisory Committee; she was a committee member until 1969.

== Death ==
Walker died on September 8, 2023, at the age of 95.

== See also ==
- List of first women mayors in the United States
