= Denver Urban Gardens =

American non-profit organization

Denver Urban Gardens (DUG) is a non-profit organization that supports community gardens in Denver, Colorado in the United States.

== Background ==
Organized urban communal gardens have existed since the 1890s. Denver was one of the first cities in the country that organized cultivation associations. Community gardening's history in Denver includes ties to the victory gardens planted during World War II with the encouragement of Mayor Benjamin Stapleton and the Mayor's Community Garden Program in the 1970s under the direction of Mayor Federico Peña.

== History ==
DUG was formally incorporated as a 501(c)(3) non-profit organization in 1985. The gardens were the brainchild of Chris Cordts a Colorado State University Extension Agent and others after being inspired by the efforts of a small group of local gardeners in Denver's Northside. The gardens were initially started to give a small group of Hmong women a place to garden. From this idea, the original three gardens were formed: the Shoshone Community Garden, the El Oasis Community Garden and the Pecos Community Garden. Many women from the lineage of this original garden group still participate today. In 2001, DUG was formally adopted as part of the city's comprehensive plan, which now provides a framework for regional gardens throughout the city.

== Organization ==
Denver Urban Gardens offers neighborhoods resources for community gardens, including ongoing technical expertise with:

- securing sustainable land for gardens
- designing and building gardens
- supporting garden organization, leadership, outreach and maintenance
- utilizing gardens as extraordinary places for learning and healthy living
- linking gardens with related local food system projects and policy

DUG stewards 192 community gardens across six counties in the Denver Metro area, as well as an urban community farm in Aurora in partnership with Project Worthmore. The organization also hosts multiple educational offerings throughout the year, including backyard Learn to Compost workshops in partnership with Denver's Climate Action Sustainability and Resilience (CASR) department. DUG is supported by municipal, county, and federal grants, as well as grants and donations from charitable foundations, corporations and individuals. Gardens are established primarily in low to moderate-income neighborhoods.

=== Populations Served by DUG ===
67 community gardens are school-based. Most school-based gardens can be used by teachers, parents, students and neighbors which builds a connection between schools and the surrounding communities. In the Garden to Cafeteria program Denver Public Schools students grow fresh fruits and vegetables in school gardens which can be used at lunch service.

Individuals and families may participate by choosing a community garden. DUG gardeners are responsible for planting, watering and harvesting their own plots. Gardeners must use organic gardening methods. A small annual fee is required which can be waived for those who demonstrate need. DUG offers free seeds and plants to those in need through their Free Seeds and Transplants program. DUG provides compost and water to gardeners. Shared spaces (pathways, flowerbeds, sheds) are cared for by all gardeners. Volunteer garden leaders and steering committees handle the day-to-day operations organizing community workdays and potlucks.

20 community gardens serve specific communities and are not open to the public. Examples include churches, refugee populations, food banks, individuals with disabilities and residences for seniors.

DUG also offers support to community gardeners in the form of seeds, compost, gardening materials and equipment, funding, garden planning and construction, classes, and community events. 22 of DUG's community gardens are located at Denver schools.

== New garden development ==
Approximately 20 new urban gardens are planned each year. DUG partners with community members to choose projects with the greatest potential for meaningful community impact and sustainability. Individuals and/or groups can request the development of a new urban garden by request a New Community Garden Information Packet and completing an application. The land used for urban gardens is either owned by DUG or is leased long-term. Since health and environmental concerns are paramount to DUG, samples of existing soil from each new garden is collected. Soil is tested for characteristics (pH, salts, lime, soil texture, organic matter and nutrients) as well as potential toxicants (arsenic, barium, cadmium, chromium, lead, mercury, selenium and silver).

== Research: Health and Community Impact ==
DUG and the Colorado School of Public Health (CSPH) have worked together since 2004 on a community based, participatory research initiative called “Gardens for Growing Healthy Communities (GGHC)” in order to understand how community gardens support healthy living. A conceptual model developed by GGHC describes community gardens as an ecological place, a social place, a cultural place, an individual place, and a healthy place – demonstrating the meaningful and multiple domains impacted by a community garden. Research conducted through GGHC is funded by the Centers for Disease Control and Prevention’s Health Protection Research Initiative, the Colorado Clinical and Translational Sciences Institute, and the J.R. Albert Foundation.

A population-based survey led by Dr. Litt of CSPH in 2006 and 2007 examined the relationship between fruit and vegetable intake, social involvement, neighborhood attachment, perceived neighborhood aesthetics and home and community gardening. 436 residents from households (all households were located within 1 mile of a community garden) and community gardens across 58 block groups in Denver were randomly selected to participate. Results showed that individuals that participated in community and home gardens reported higher fruit and vegetable intake than did non-gardeners. Specifically, 56% of community gardeners consumed fruits and vegetables at least 5 times per day, compared with 37% of home gardeners and 25% of non-gardeners. Physical activity was also positively associated with fruit and vegetable consumption as was higher levels of social involvement and more positive perceptions of neighborhood aesthetics.

Another GGHC study led by James Hale interviewed 67 gardeners from 28 Denver urban gardens to explore gardeners' tactile, emotional, and value-driven responses to gardening and these responses influence health. Gardeners described the contrast between the traffic, noise and pollution of the city with the silence, nature sounds and cool of the garden. They explained how growing their own food led to improved enjoyment of vegetables, and increased quantity and diversity of vegetables consumed. Also, gardeners spoke of gardens increasing their leisure-time physical activity in biking and walking to the garden and then in the planting, raking, digging and other garden chores. Finally, many gardeners described gardening as a therapeutic experience, where they were able to work through mental pain and express emotions in a healthy way.

A third study conducted through GGHC examined the social processes involved with community gardening. The results showed that gardens offer social opportunities, a non-threatening way to participate in a group, the sense of safety and security even in a garden located in a dangerous area, encouraged friendship, and mutual trust. The gardens promoted constructive relationships and enhanced conflict resolution skills among diverse members of the garden. The study concluded "place-based social processes found in community gardens support collective efficacy, a powerful mechanism for enhancing the role of gardens in promoting health."

== Future of DUG ==
Denver Urban Gardens seeks new ways for the gardens to reach deeper into communities and increase positive impacts on health, community building and environment. Replacing empty lots with a bountiful harvest creates community pride. As more people find that growing their own food is one of the easiest ways to improve individual, community and environmental health. DUG was awarded a $70,000 grant from the USDA People’s Garden Grant Program in 2011. They were one of 10 programs selected from a pool of 360 applicants. The goal of the program is to give people in underserved neighborhoods access to fresh, healthy fruits and vegetables. Denver Urban Gardens will play a growing, long-term role in improving health and serving as a local and national model for food security. They will continue to work with the Colorado School of Public Health on an ongoing basis on other research projects, e.g., doing individual health studies with new gardeners. The impact on people’s health has been huge, according to the studies that they’ve done with CSPH for the past 6 years. People report feeling healthier which leads to behavioral changes. Community gardens can serve as a sustainable and inexpensive intervention in improving public health.
