= Mission Viejo, Aurora, Colorado =

Neighborhood in Aurora, Colorado, United States

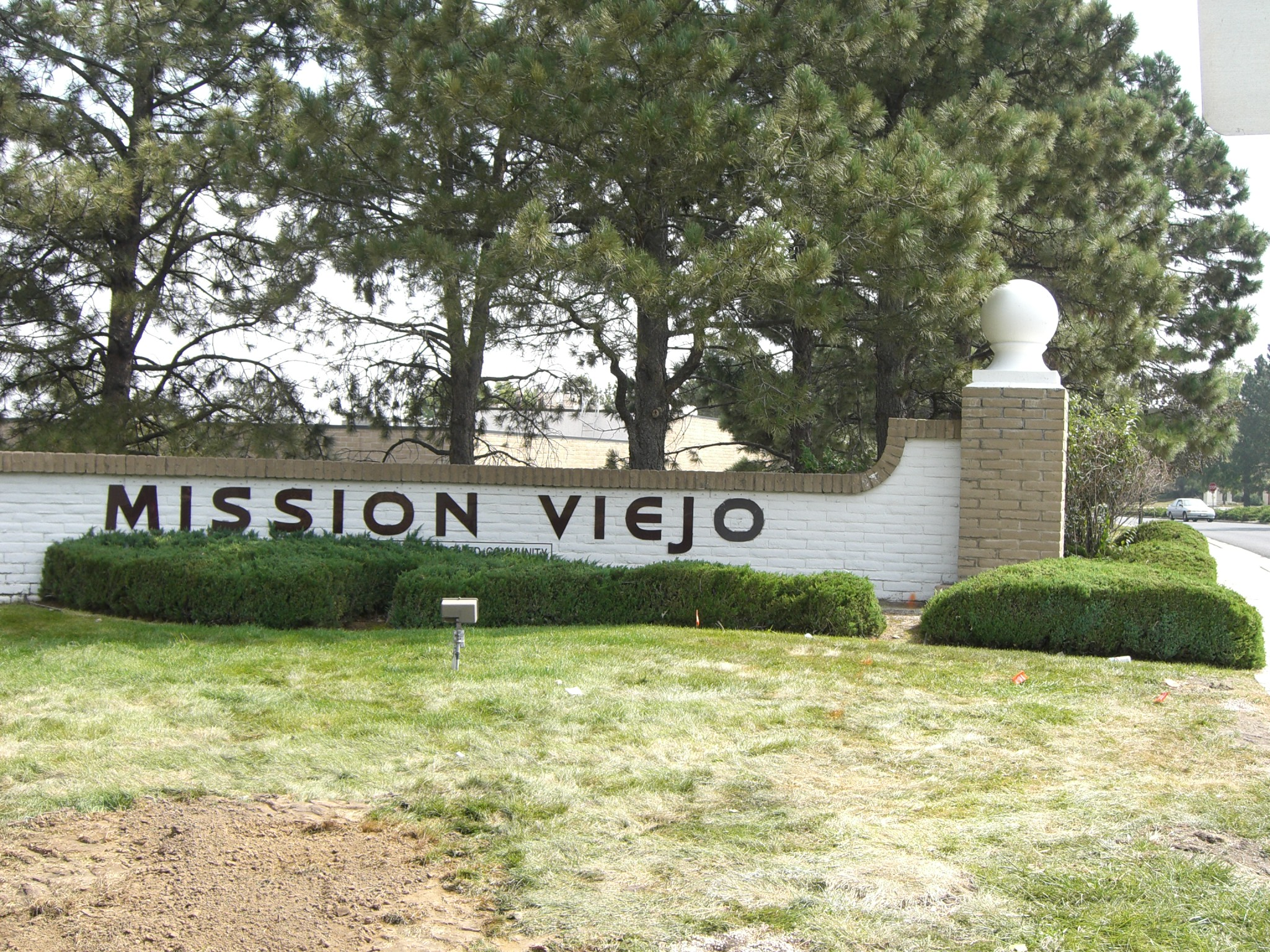

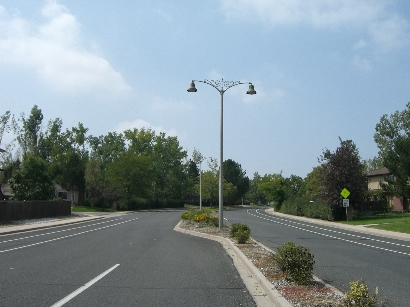

Mission Viejo is a subdivision of Aurora, Colorado, in the Denver-Aurora Metropolitan Area. It is bordered by Buckley Road to the east, Hampden Avenue to the north, Chambers Road to the west and Quincy Avenue to the south.

The land on which Mission Viejo lies was once a homestead at the corner of Quincy Avenue and Chambers Road. The 640-acre (2.6 km^{2}) plot was purchased around 1972 by the Mission Viejo Company of California with the purpose of creating a planned development in the style of Mission Viejo, California with "Barcelona" entrance walls and "Mission Bell" street lights. Two parkways (Alicia and Marguerite) are also named in honor of Rancho Mission Viejo's matriarchs. The development opened in September 1972.

The subdivision contains parks, a public library branch, homes of various styles, and a Cherry Creek Schools elementary school. Notable features of the subdivision include the circular drive at its center formed by Mission Parkway, Alicia Parkway and Mission Viejo Park. Mission Viejo Park comprises a large part of the interior of the circle, providing walkways, picnic areas, ball fields, and a large space for family and community events. Tollgate Creek also runs along the west edge of the park, next to a paved walkway where residents often walk their dogs. Mission Viejo is made up of at least three covenant-controlled communities, Mission Viejo (houses), Seville Townhomes (northern-area condos/townhomes) and Cherry Glen (southern-area condos/townhomes).

== Mission Viejo HOA Suit Against the City of Aurora ==
The City of Aurora decided to close the Mission Viejo library branch in 2009 due to budget cuts across the city departments. At the November 17, 2009, Mission Viejo HOA Board of Directors meeting, the board decided to retain an attorney to seek an injunction against the city's proposed action to close the Mission Viejo branch. The HOA believed the City of Aurora was in breach of a 1973 agreement that the city made with the Mission Viejo Company which obligated the city to furnish library services for 50 years. The Aurora City Council decided on December 5, 2011, to not issue a 90-day notice to close the library. Instead a special study session was held January 30, 2012, to discuss the Mission Viejo branch closure as well as other city library issues. After meeting in mediation with the City of Aurora on January 26, the Mission Viejo HOA and the City of Aurora reached a settlement. The agreement was accepted by the Aurora City Council on February 28. The new agreement ensures that Mission Viejo branch will be open well past the fifteen years remaining on the original contract.
