= Platt College (Colorado) =

Private, for-profit educational institution

Coordinates: 39°36′47″N 104°53′57″W

Platt College is a private, for-profit nursing school located in Greenwood Village, Colorado, United States. Platt College currently offers only one degree program, a Bachelor of Science in Nursing (BSN) in 3 years. Platt College graduates are awarded a Bachelor of Science in Nursing degree. Following successful completion of the BSN curriculum, graduates apply to take the National Council Licensure Examination-Registered Nurse (NCLEX-RN®) through the State Board of Nursing. Upon successful completion of the NCLEX-RN, a graduate of Platt College is then qualified to seek employment as a Registered Nurse (RN).

== History ==
Platt College Colorado was founded by Jerald B. Sirbu in 1986 as a private, for profit, post-secondary school specializing in office practices. In 1988 and 1989, Graphic Design and Computer Graphics programs were added to Platt’s offerings. To further expand its appeal, Platt sought and was approved for Associate Degrees in both Graphics and Business programs. By the year 2000, Platt had been approved for Baccalaureate degrees in Graphics, Business, plus its new program, Information Technology. The Business offerings were dropped soon after an increasing drop in enrollments to those programs.

In 2005, management made the decision to formally drop the struggling Information Technology program and to pursue a transformation into nursing education while training out the remaining students in the graphics programs. The program was conceived of by Patricia Simpson, former Director of Education. Simpson was instrumental in forming a team to write and present a curriculum for approval by the Colorado Board of Nursing who approved Platt for a Bachelorette in Science, Nursing. The program was subsequently approved for national accreditation by The Accreditation Commission for Education in Nursing (ACEN).

In October 2024, it was announced that Platt College would become a part of Concordia University, St. Paul in Minnesota.
