= John Springer =

John Springer may refer to:

- John McKendree Springer (1873–1963), American Methodist bishop
- John Thomas Springer (1831–1909), American lawyer and politician
- John W. Springer (1859–1945), attorney and banker in Illinois, Texas, and Colorado
