= Denver Technological Center =

Business park in Colorado, United States

Coordinates: 39°37′27″N 104°53′41″W

Denver Technological Center, better known as The Denver Tech Center or DTC, is a business and economic trading center located in Colorado in the southeastern portion of the Denver Metropolitan Area, within portions of the cities of Denver and Greenwood Village. The DTC roughly corresponds to the area surrounding the I-25 corridor between I-225 and SH 88 (Arapahoe Road) and has a similar business community reputation to Palo Alto, California.

The DTC was founded in 1962 on 40 acres. It is home to several major businesses and corporations. In 2023, its owner Shea Properties stated the park encompassed 908 acres, with a workforce of around 35,000 and around 1,000 companies as tenants.

== History ==
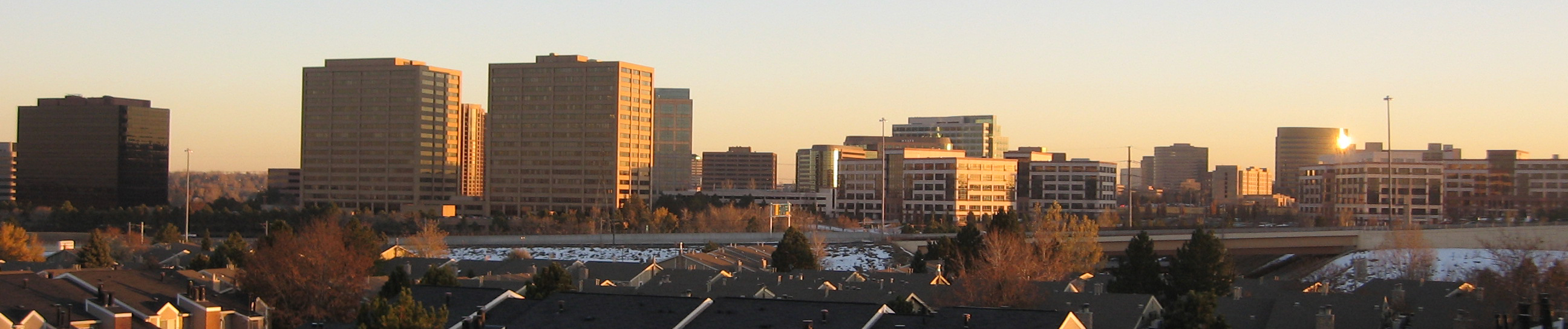
Skyline of the Denver Tech Center.

The Denver Tech Center was founded in 1962 on 40 acres. When it was developed in 1962, the Denver Technological Center was "one of the first suburban office parks in the United States," located at the junction of Interstate 25 and Interstate 225. George Wallace, a founder of the DTC, had started picking out parcels of land in Arapahoe County before founding the park, including property owned by the Bansbach family. John Madden Jr., a developer, was involved in the project along with DTC founder George Wallace. It started on 40 acres, and in terms of development, "George Wallace was on the east side of I-25 and John Madden was on the west side of I-25." The Denver Tech Center was designed by architect/planner Carl A. Worthington. In the early 1970s, investors asked Worthington to complete a conceptual master plan along a new fiber optic line south of downtown Denver. The master plan started with forty acres, with potential for an additional 800 acres. The plan subsequently grew to 850 acres, with over 25 million square feet of completed buildings.

The DTC was established in the early 1970s. Cable companies United Cablevision, United Artists Cable, and later AT&T Broadband, all had their start in - and still have major infrastructure around - the Denver Tech Center. In the Colorado area, Bill Daniels and John C. Malone were early adopters who shepherded many standards in cable technology. The area's progress was a major reason for Denver Regional Council of Governments' T-REX expansion into the Denver Tech Center, which built new light rail lines connecting the Denver Tech Center to downtown Denver.

Part of the 1992 film Ladybugs was shot at the park in 1992.

In 2005, DTC was owned by Peninsular & Oriental Steam Navigation Co., an operator of ports and ferries based in London. DTC Meridian operated as a P&O subsidiary, owning a handful of the buildings on the park, and also owning the 100 acres not yet developed. Overall, the DTC park covered 900 acres. In late 2005, Peninsular & Oriental agreed to be acquired by DP World, giving DP World full control of the DTC. However, in February 2006, it was announced that P&O had sold its entire property portfolio in Denver to Shea Homes, a US building company, for an undisclosed amount.

In 2009, Oracle and Sun Microsystems both had workers in the Denver Tech Center. In 2010, the DTC had 40,000 workers in around 14 million square feet of office space. In 2016, Quixote Capital Management was based in the Denver Tech Center. So was the James P. and Rebecca T. Craig Foundation, and Three Peaks Capital Management.

In 2023, Shea Properties, the owner of DTC, stated the park was 908 acres with a workforce of more than 35,000 and more than 1,000 companies. Also in 2023, the Denver Post reported that the vacancy rate in DTC was 16.7%, while the overall vacancy rate of downtown Denver was 28.8%, and 21.2% for the suburbs. Unlike newer business parks, the newspaper noted that the DTC had been built with places to eat and shop as "afterthoughts", with many of the buildings dating back to the 1980s and 1990s.

== Features ==
The Denver Tech Center is symbolized by the DTC Identity Monument, which sits immediately between I-25 and DTC Parkway in Greenwood Village. The monument was designed by Barber Architecture and is meant to resemble the framework of a skyscraper.

Other business parks in the same vicinity are Inverness Business Park and Meridian Business Park, located farther south along I-25.

== Notable Denver Tech Center area companies ==
- Agilent Technologies
- Air Methods (headquarters), moved to DTC in 2017
- Aimco (Apartment Investment Management Company), (Headquarters)
- Allied Insurance
- Arrow Electronics, Inc.
- Bank of America
- Booz Allen Hamilton
- Boeing
- CableLabs, developed cable standards DOCSIS and CableCard
- Clear Stone Associates
- Charter Communications
- CH Robinson
- Ciber
- Comcast
- Cordell & Cordell
- DHL Express
- Dow Jones & Company, Inc.
- Eide Bailly LLP
- Empower Retirement
- Envivio
- Farnsworth Group
- Fidelity Investments
- Gold Fields Ltd, Gold Fields Exploration, Inc.
- Great-West Life
- HP
- ICG Communications
- Jacobs Engineering
- JP Morgan
- Dulin McQuinn Young
- Kraft Foods
- Lennar
- Liberty Global
- London Trust Media (headquarters)
- Martin Collier Phillips Corporation
- Merrill Lynch
- Microsoft
- Morgan Stanley
- Mosaic Family Wealth
- Nationwide Insurance
- Nestlé
- Newmont Mining Corporation
- Nissan Motor Corporation
- NBCUniversal
- Oracle Corp.
- Pax8
- PepsiCo
- Plante Moran
- ProBuild
- Protective Life
- Red Robin, (Headquarters)
- ReportsNow, (Headquarters)
- RE/MAX, (Headquarters)
- RSM US
- SAP
- Shaw Group
- Sprint
- Stanley Consultants
- Starz Entertainment
- The CE Shop
- TeleTech
- URS Corp.
- United Launch Alliance
- VF Corporation, (Temporary Headquarters)
- Wachovia Securities
- Western Union
- WideOpenWest
- Workiva
- WSP Global
- XO Communications
- Zoom Video Communications

== See also ==
- List of companies with Denver area operations
