= Highlands Ranch Mansion =

Building in Colorado, United States

Coordinates: 39°32′11.08″N 104°58′11.75″W

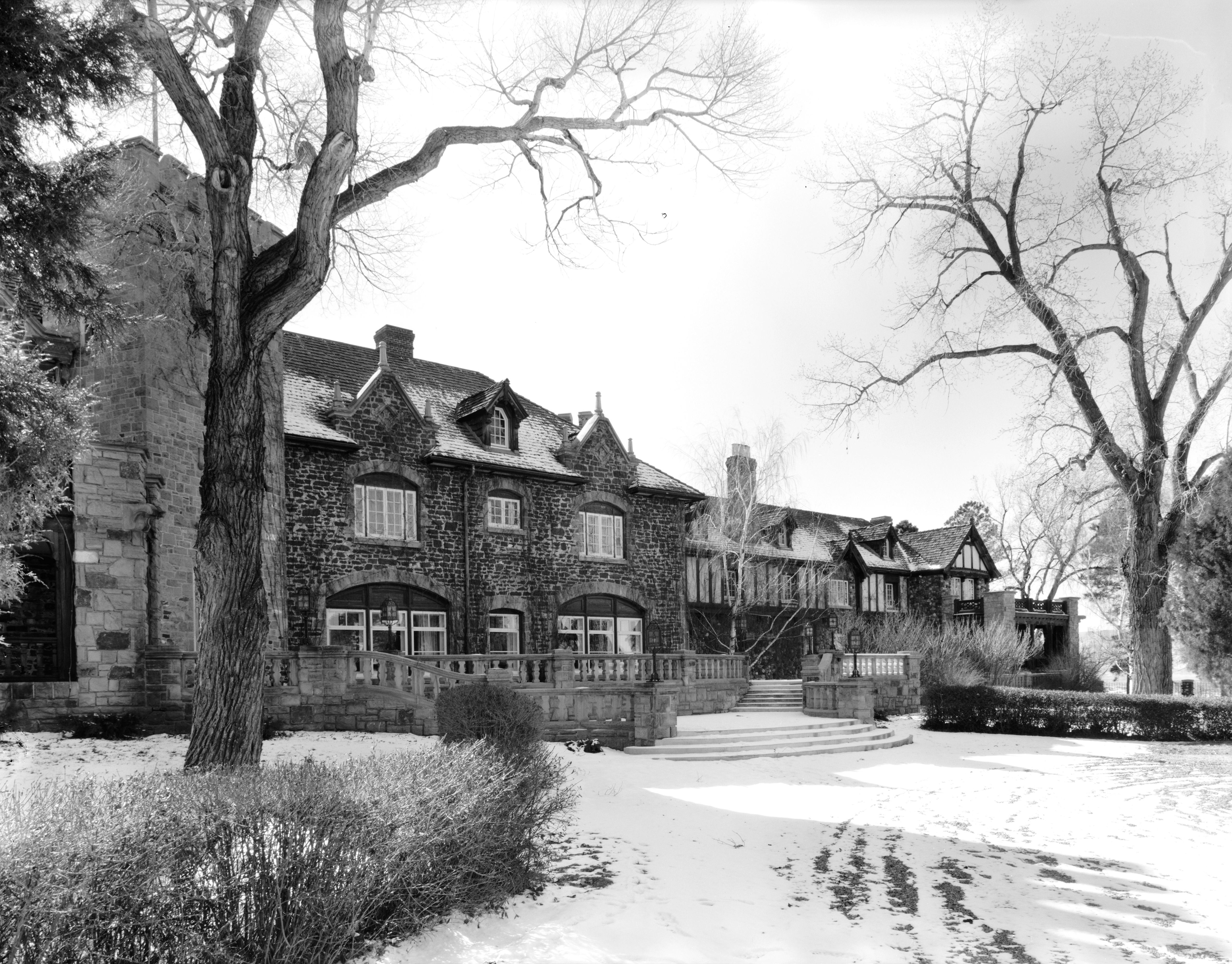
Highlands Ranch Mansion in 1962

The Highlands Ranch Mansion is a historic property in Colorado.

== History ==
The Mansion was built over a number of years. Samuel Allen Long homesteaded the property, building a small stone house on the far east side of today's mansion, which he called Rotherwood after a favorite childhood farm. John W. Springer, a wealthy man with ties to politics, banking, and law, owned the ranch from 1897 to 1913. He sold the Mansion to his father-in-law, Col. William Hughes, who renamed the property "Sunland Ranch". Springer's daughter, Annie Clifton Springer Hughes, inherited the home after Col. Hughes passed in July 1918. It is unknown how much of the mansion the Springer/Hughes family built, but photos from the 1920s indicate that the footprint of the current building existed by 1926.

Waite Phillips purchased Sunland Ranch from Annie Springer and her husband Lafayette Hughes (no relation to Colonel William Hughes) in 1920 and used it as a breeding location for high grade horses and cattle. He consolidated the ranch with other nearby land purchases to create a prodigious spread called Phillips Highland Ranch (no S) named after the Highland Hereford cattle he raised here. Waite conducted a renovation at the former Springer/Hughes home which included the addition of a western wing. A whimsical photograph taken of Waite's son, Elliott Waite “Chope,” sitting atop a pony in the middle of the living room reveals a unique view into family life at Phillips Highland Ranch. Waite owned the ranch for six years before commitments in Oklahoma forced him to sell it in 1926.

In 1926, Frank E. Kistler purchased the Mansion renamed it the Diamond K Ranch, and began breeding operations that specialized in dairy and Angus cattle, sheep, chickens, and hogs. The Diamond K Ranch proved to be another successful venture for Frank. He, Florence, and their four children, quickly settled into Denver's high society scene, rubbing elbows with the influential upper class. In 1929, Kistler remarried a beautiful widow named Leanna Antonides. They transformed the exterior style from a gothic stone castle to a classic English Tudor, included a sprawling front patio, and added to the western wing. Beautiful interior additions included a breathtaking clock and personalized fireplace facade in the living room. The renovations occurred simultaneously with a troubling period in US history, the Stock Market Crash of 1929, and Frank was among the many that lost millions during this crippling era. He was forced to sell the Diamond K Ranch in 1937 to Lawrence Phipps, Jr. and moved to Glenwood Springs where he bought and operated the Hotel Colorado and adjoining hot springs.

Lawrence Phipps, Jr., a son of former Colorado Senator Lawrence C. Phipps, bought the property in 1937. A keen business sense served Lawrence well in all of his varied pursuits, but his true love in life was ranching, with a special fondness for horses. In 1929, he resurrected the Arapahoe Hunt Club, a group of horse backed hunters who, aided by a band of foxhounds, pursued coyote as opposed to the English tradition of foxes. At Lawrence's request, Frank Kistler granted permission in 1929 to the club to headquarter and hunt at the Diamond K Ranch and a few years later Lawrence was honored with the title Master of the Hunt.

During his days spent chasing the wily prey, Lawrence fell in love with the ranch's rolling hills, and when Kistler finally succumbed to his financial woes and put the ranch up for sale in 1937, Lawrence did not hesitate to snatch it up. He renamed it Highlands Ranch and happily lived the remainder of his life here. Upon Lawrence's death in 1976, the ranch passed to his estate which handled its sale to Marvin Davis, head of the Highlands Ventures Corporation.

Marvin Davis marketed the Mansion and the surrounding property. In 1978, the Mission Viejo Corporation agreed to a two-year option agreement to finally become the official owners of the Highlands Ranch lands in 1979. In 1978, the Mansion was used as the setting of the fictional Venneford Ranch in the miniseries Centennial.

In 1978, Highland Ventures sold the property to Mission Viejo Company and the development of the planned community called Highlands Ranch began. Mission Viejo subsequently sold the remaining undeveloped property in Highlands Ranch to Shea Homes in 1997. During that entire 30 year time frame, the Mansion sat basically empty.

Shea Homes conveyed the Mansion to the Highlands Ranch Metro District in April 2010. The renovations of the Mansion cost $6 million. The Metro District used interest earnings on developer fees, collected for the purpose of building Highlands Ranch infrastructure, to fund the renovations. With the concurrence of Shea Homes as representative of the builders within the Highlands Ranch community, the Metro District Board of Directors decided that $4 million of developer fees be set aside as an "endowment'" Interest earnings on the endowment may be used to support the operations of the Mansion. The Metro District continues to operate the Mansion without the use of tax dollars.

== Highlands Ranch Metro District Now Owners of Mansion ==
The Highlands Ranch Metro District became the current owner of the Highlands Ranch Mansion in April 2010. The Metro District developed a projected timeline for the next couple years. The Metro District proceeded with the design of the building renovation and managed the site planning process and subsequent Douglas County approvals. Renovations to the Mansion commenced in 2011.

The renovations of the Mansion cost $6 million, with another $4 million dedicated to an endowment fund that will use interest earned to support future operations.

On June 15, 2012, the Highlands Ranch Metro District hosted the Grand Re-Opening of the Mansion.

The Mansion is open year-round to the public. The Mansion also hosts many community events throughout the year. All public events and property operations are funded by private events hosted at the Mansion.

== See also ==
- Highlands Ranch, Colorado
