= Southern California Edison shooting =

2011 mass shooting in California, U.S.

- Location: Irwindale, California, United States
- Date: December 16, 2011; 1:30 pm (Pacific Time)
- Target: Coworkers
- Attack type: Mass shooting, murder-suicide
- Weapon: Semi-automatic handgun
- Deaths: 3 (including the perpetrator)
- Injuries: 2
- Perpetrator: Andre Turner

On December 16, 2011, a mass shooting occurred inside a Southern California Edison office building in Irwindale, California. The gunman, Andre Turner, killed two employees and wounded two others before committing suicide.

== Shooting ==
Andre Turner, 48, arrived at an office building that primarily houses information technology employees, at his usual work time in the morning. He showed no signs of strange behavior prior to the attack and people weren't even aware of the shooting unfolding. At 1:30 pm, Turner took out a handgun in an office building and shot four people. A relative of an eyewitness claimed that the eyewitness saw the gunman walk in to a room and told a manager he was going to shoot him before the gunman opened fire.

Investigators told reporters that Turner reportedly walked around the building during the shooting and talked to other employees who were unaware that he was the shooter, with many employees also unaware that there was a shooting at all. Other employees took action to protect themselves by pilling equipment in front of doors, and hiding in offices.

== Victims ==
Two employees died: Henry Serrano, 56, of Walnut, and Robert Lindsay, 53, of Chino Hills, who were both supervisors and worked at the facility for at least twenty years. Angela Alvarez, 46, was critically wounded and Abhay Pimpale, 38, received a gun shot to his thigh. During the shooting rampage, Turner engaged in conversation with his co-workers. Turner then shot himself to death.

== Perpetrator ==
The shooter worked at Edison for seven years.

Records indicated that Turner had a civil judgement against him and was being sued. Riverside County Superior Court records show that an individual bearing the same name was sued by Citibank in 2008 and was awarded a default judgment against him in 2009, he was sued again by Cavalry Portfolio; a debt collection agency, in 2009. He was also listed as a plaintiff in a class-action suit against UDC Homes that was dismissed in 2005.

Turner had also been verbally reprimanded by his boss and was told that his employment was going to be terminated.

== Aftermath ==
As a result, nearby schools were put on lock down, as were other Southern California Edison offices within a 50-mile radius.

SCE started a fund for employees to benefit the victims' families. The company seeded the fund with $100,000 and promised to match employee contributions. The company performed an internal audit after the shooting which discovered a bloated management structure in the information technology department, which contributed to an unhealthy work environment. The report was contributed to with interviews from more than 700 employees. They also began making other changes shortly after the shooting which increased security measures, "augmented" training for managers and supervisors, enhancements to workplace violence and crisis-response programs and a review of employee performance is assessed.

== See also ==
- List of homicides in California
