= Centennial (miniseries) =

- DVD cover art
- Based on: Centennial by James A. Michener
- Written by: Charles Larson; John Wilder; Jerry Ziegman
- Directed by: Harry Falk; Paul Krasny; Bernard McEveety; Virgil W. Vogel
- Starring: Michael Ansara; Barbara Carrera; Raymond Burr; Richard Chamberlain; Robert Conrad; Richard Crenna; Timothy Dalton; Andy Griffith; Mark Harmon; Gregory Harrison; David Janssen; Alex Karras; Brian Keith; Stephen McHattie; Lois Nettleton; Adrienne La Russa; Lynn Redgrave; Pernell Roberts; Robert Vaughn; Dennis Weaver; Anthony Zerbe; Stephanie Zimbalist
- Composer: John Addison
- Country of origin: United States
- No. of episodes: 12

Production
- Producers: Howard P. Alston; Alex Beaton; (Chapter 6); George E. Crosby; Malcolm R. Harding
- Editors: Howard Deane; John Elias; Bill Parker; Ralph Schoenfeld; Robert F. Shugrue; Robert Watts
- Running time: 1256 min. (12 episodes)
- Production company: MCA/Universal

Original release
- Network: NBC
- Release: October 1, 1978 – February 4, 1979

Centennial is a 12-episode American television miniseries that aired on NBC from October 1978 to February 1979, and again from September 1980 to October 1980. The miniseries follows the fictional history of Centennial, Colorado, from 1795 to the 1970s. It was based on the 1974 novel of the same name by James A. Michener and was produced by John Wilder.

With a runtime of 26 hours and a $25 million budget, it was one of the longest American miniseries ever and the most expensive television show in history. It employed four directors and five cinematographers, and featured over 100 speaking parts. Centennial was released on DVD on July 29, 2008.

== Synopsis ==
This epic television series chronicles the settlement and development of an area of Colorado that would eventually become the fictional town of Centennial. It begins with the arrival of the first white men, French trapper Pasquinel and Scottish trader Alexander McKeag. Other settlers who care for the land and attempt to co-exist with the original Pawnee and Cheyenne people are Mennonite Levi Zendt, who founds the town, German immigrant Hans Brumbaugh, who is the first to raise crops, and Englishman Oliver Seccombe, who sees the opportunity to graze large herds of cattle.

As the town grows and evolves, the land loses its unspoiled beauty. Later arrivals include the Wendell family who seeks to gain power and wealth, and Colonel Frank Skimmerhorn who believes only the white man belongs and that the Indians must either be killed or driven off. In the modern era, rancher Paul Garrett, who can trace his family line back to Pasquinel, fights to prevent exploitation of the land by Morgan Wendell, a wealthy businessman.

== Cast ==
=== Principal cast ===
- Michael Ansara – Lame Beaver
- William Atherton – Jim Lloyd
- Raymond Burr – Herman Bockweiss
- Barbara Carrera – Clay Basket
- Richard Chamberlain – Alexander McKeag
- Robert Conrad – Pasquinel
- Richard Crenna – Col. Frank Skimmerhorn
- Timothy Dalton – Oliver Seccombe
- Cliff DeYoung – John Skimmerhorn
- Chad Everett – Major Maxwell Mercy
- Sharon Gless – Sidney Endermann
- Andy Griffith – Prof. Lewis Vernor
- Merle Haggard – Cisco Calendar
- Mark Harmon – Captain John McIntosh
- Gregory Harrison – Levi Zendt
- David Janssen – Paul Garrett (Narrator)
- Alex Karras – Hans Brumbaugh
- Brian Keith – Sheriff Axel Dumire
- Sally Kellerman – Lise Bockweiss Pasquinel
- A Martinez – Tranquilino Marquez
- Stephen McHattie – Jacques Pasquinel (adult)
- Lois Nettleton – Maude Wendell
- Donald Pleasence – Sam Purchas
- Cristina Raines – Lucinda McKeag Zendt
- Lynn Redgrave – Charlotte Buckland Seccombe Lloyd
- Clive Revill – Finlay Perkin
- Kario Salem – Marcel Pasquinel (adult)
- Clint Walker – Joe Bean
- Dennis Weaver – R. J. Poteet
- Robert Vaughn – Morgan Wendell
- Anthony Zerbe – Mervin Wendell
- Stephanie Zimbalist – Elly Zahm Zendt

=== Other cast ===
- Maria Yolanda Aguayo – Blue Leaf (child)
- Stephan Andrade – 1st Arapaho
- Phyllis Applegate – Clerk
- Royce D. Applegate – Mr. Holmes
- Ed Bakey – Floyd Calendar
- James Best – Hank Garvey
- Scott Birney – Zendt Farm Child
- William Bogert – William Bellamy
- Lynn Borden – Vesta Volkema
- Siegfried H. Brauer III – Extra
- Marta Brennan – Mary Sibley
- Reb Brown – Jim Bridger
- Bo Brundin – Magnes Volkema
- Steve Burns – Pvt. James Clark
- Barry Cahill – Maj. O'Neil
- Alan Caillou – Booth-Clibborn
- Rafael Campos – Nacho Gomez
- Joan Carey – Miss Kruger
- Dave Cass – Frank Pettis
- Karen Carlson – Lisette Mercy
- Annette Charles – Senora Alvarez
- Alex Colon – Father Vigil
- Henry Darrow – Alvarez
- Ralph Davies Lewis – Tom Ragland
- Bob Davis – Bank Manager
- Joella Deffenbaugh – Fat Laura
- Dennis Dimster – Timmy Grebe
- Robert DoQui – Nate Person III
- Burt Douglas – Capt. William Ketchum
- Damon Douglas – William Savage
- Robert Douglas – Claude Richards
- Robert Easton – Maj. George Sibley
- Dana Elcar – Judge Hart
- René Enríquez – Manolo Marquez
- H.P. Evetts – Orvid Pettis
- Darrell Fetty – Burns
- Dennis Fimple – Buck
- Carl Franklin – Jim Beckworth
- Lou Frizzell – Mr. Norriss
- Chief Dan George – Old Sioux
- Byron Gilbert – Truinfador Marquez
- Silvana Gallardo – Serafina Marquez
- Michael Goodrow – Ethan Grebe
- Lani Grant – Mrs. Takemoto
- Jacques Hampton – Doctor
- James Hampton – Defense Atty. Prescott
- Alex Henteloff – Bradley Finch
- Allan Hunt – Stanford
- Gordon Hurst – Clay
- Scott Hylands – Laseter
- Richard Jaeckel – Sgt. Lykes
- Claude Jarman, Jr. – Earl Grebe
- Claude Earl Jones – Matt
- Morris Jones – 1st Reporter
- John Kings – Englishman
- James Kisicki – Rev. Fenstermacher
- Eric Lalich – Jake Calendar
- David and Daniel Lange – Ben Dawson (age 9)
- Les Lannom – Buford Coker
- William Lanteau – Flagg
- Adrienne La Russa – Clemma Zendt
- Tony LaTorre – Marcel (age 7)
- Michael Le Clair – Jim Lloyd (young)
- Geoffrey Lewis – Sheriff Bogardus
- Duane Loken – 1st Cheyenne
- Christopher Lowell – Keefe
- Jaimie MacDonald – Jacques (ages 6–9)
- Jay W. MacIntosh – Emma Lloyd
- Joaquín Martínez – Col. Salcedo
- Barney McFadden – Abel Tanner
- Doug McKeon – Philip Wendell (as a boy)
- Gloria McMillan – Clara Brumbaugh
- Jim McMullan – Prosecutor
- Sandy McPeak – Soren Sorenson
- Mari Michener – Janice Welch
- Julio Medina – Father Gravez
- Art Metrano – Maurice Cartwright
- Greg Mullavey – Mule Canby
- Karmin Murcelo – Flor Marquez
- Alan Napier – Lord Venneford
- Ivan Naranjo – Gray Wolf
- Mark Neely – Martin Zendt
- Richard O'Brien – Judge
- Rachel Orr – Victoria Grebe
- Michael K. Osborn – Mr. Kellen
- Gene Otis – Stringer
- Morgan Paull – Philip Wendell (adult)
- John Bennett Perry – Mahlon Zendt
- Robert Phalen – Rev. Holly
- Terry Phillips – Newscaster
- Maria Potts – Blue Leaf
- Monika Ramirez – Blue Leaf (age 14)
- Nick Ramus – Lost Eagle
- Steven Rapp – Kurt Brumbaugh
- Debi Richter – Rebecca Stoltzfus
- Clint Ritchie – Messmore Garrett
- Jorge Rivero – Broken Thumb
- Pernell Roberts – Gen. Asher
- Vincent Roberts – Jacques Pasquinel (teenager)
- Frank S. Salsedo – Sam Lopez
- Steve Sandor – Charley Kin
- Eric Server – Pierce
- Steve Shaw – Paul Garrett (as a boy)
- Steve Shemayne – Pawnee Chief
- Stuart Silbar – Col. Hanley
- James J. Sloyan – Spade Larkin
- Robert Somers – Sergeant
- Julie Sommars – Alice Grebe
- Gale Sondergaard – Aunt Augusta
- Gordon Steel – Donald McPherson
- Sterling Swanson – Hunter
- Takashi – Mr. Takemoto
- Irene Tedrow – Mother Zendt
- Robert Tessier – Rude Water
- Marshall Thompson – Dennis
- Tiger Thompson – Young Beeley Garrett
- Bill Thurman – Uncle Dick
- Ray Tracey – Lame Beaver (young)
- Deborah Trissell – Miss Keller (credited in Episode No. 9, in which she can't be seen)
- Glynn Turman – Nate Person
- Mina Vasquez – Soledad Marquez
- Alan Vint – Beeley Garrett (adult)
- Jesse Vint – Amos Calendar
- Robert Walden – Dr. Richard Butler
- Robby Weaver – Gompert
- Van Williams – George
- Leslie Winston – Laura Lou Booker
- Morgan Woodward – Gen. Wade
- David Yanez – Lame Beaver (age 9)
- Ken Yellow Moon – 2nd Arapaho

== Episodes ==
No.	Title	Runtime	Directed by	Written by	Original release date
1	"Only the Rocks Live Forever"	147 minutes	Virgil W. Vogel	John Wilder	October 1, 1978
The first episode begins in 1756, showing the developing arms race between tribes over horses and rifles while introducing a nine-year old Arapaho boy named Lame Beaver. By 1795, he is a leading warrior and encounters Pasquinel, a voyageur or coureur des bois. Having counted coup, he is allowed to trade beaver pelts for imported trinkets. Other tribes, such as the Cheyenne, assist him though some, such as the Pawnee and other traders, are less trustworthy. In 1796, Pasquinel, wounded and robbed of two years worth of pelts, returns to St. Louis. Here he is introduced by a surgeon to Herman Bockweiss, a Bavarian silversmith, and they discuss financing. Pasquinel again heads west and frees Alexander McKeag, a Scottish trapper, from the Pawnee and gives the chief gifts to guarantee safe travel through his land. Their travels lead to encounters with river pirates, Ute braves, and back to the Arapaho, where McKeag meets Lame Beaver's daughter, Clay Basket. By 1800, back in St. Louis, Pasquinel marries Lise Bockweiss. Meanwhile, after flashbacks about his exploits, Lame Beaver discovers a gold nugget and makes it into bullets for his rifle. Later, he leads a raid against the Pawnee, killing their chief before he is slain, leading to the ransacking of his teepee and the death of his wife. Now orphaned, Clay Basket tells Pasquinel that she is meant to marry him, which he accepts despite McKeag's reservations.
2	"The Yellow Apron"	94 minutes	Virgil W. Vogel	John Wilder	October 8, 1978
The story resumes in 1816 after Pasquinel has fathered two sons by Clay Basket (Jacques in 1809 and Marcel in 1811) and a daughter, Lisette, by Lise. Pasquinel continues his search for Lame Beaver's gold while McKeag disapproves of his bigamy. Despite McKeag's concerns, Pasquinel decides to take his Indian family to a fort near St. Louis, where Jacques is wounded in a scuffle with drunken soldiers. Pasquinel returns to Lise and decides to remain as a trader in the city. Meanwhile, McKeag, Clay Basket, and the boys continue trapping, but not without incident as Kiowas, searching for guns, attack their camp. Pasquinel eventually returns to his Indian family, as tensions rise and McKeag leaves. In 1825, McKeag departs St. Louis and begins to live as a hermit while Pasquinel continues to search for Lame Beaver's gold, and finds out his wife is pregnant. Two years later, passing trappers invite McKeag to a rendezvous near Bear Lake. Here he is given the "Yellow Apron", and performs a Scottish jig. He then reunites and dances with Pasquinel, who collapses and asks McKeag to cut the arrow from his back. Pasquinel, with his sons now riding with the Sioux, then asks McKeag to rejoin him, but he refuses. In 1830 in St. Louis, McKeag runs into Lise. She knows that McKeag aches for his friend and encourages the Scotsman to "go to him". McKeag agrees and arrives just as Pasquinel finally finds Lame Beaver's gold but is killed by Pawnee warriors. McKeag then vows to care for Clay Basket and her daughter as his own.
3	"The Wagon and the Elephant"	96 minutes	Paul Krasny	Jerry Ziegman	October 28, 1978
Levi Zendt is from a Mennonite family living in Lancaster County, Pennsylvania. In 1845, however, Zendt is falsely accused of attempted rape and is shunned. He decides to leave for Oregon Country and purchases an old covered wagon. Before leaving, he goes to the local orphanage and picks up Elly Zahm, another social outcast who is shunned for being a bastard. Zahm then begins narrating their adventure via letters as the pair head west and marry. After sailing down the Ohio River, they go to St. Louis by steamboat. Here they meet an English writer and explorer, Oliver Seccombe, as well as Captain Maxwell Mercy, who is married to Lisette Pasquinel. The group join a wagon train heading along the Oregon Trail piloted by Sam Purchas, a hardened mountain man who forces Zendt to sell his beloved horses. On the Great Plains, Zendt hears about "the elephant" and the party encounter the Pasquinel brothers. After stopping at Fort John and meeting the McKeag family, who run the general store, the Zendts continue toward the Rocky Mountains. After meeting some "turnarounds", the Zendts return to the fort after Purchas tries to rape Elly. McKeag offers to partner with them in building a trading post near where Pasquinel first met Lame Beaver. Zendt agrees; however, en route Elly Zendt is killed by a rattlesnake. Devastated, Zendt heads into the mountains to live alone in the hut once occupied by McKeag.
4	"For as Long as the Waters Flow"	96 minutes	Paul Krasny	Jerry Ziegman	November 4, 1978
The narrator explains how, despite the number of settlers increasing, nearly all actually traverse Indian lands peacefully and safely. In 1851, at Fort John (now known as Laramie), Mercy hears word of a proposed treaty among the Plains tribes. Mercy invites their chiefs to a peace conference which guarantees safe passage to settlers on the Oregon Trail, "for as long as the waters flow", in exchange for legal recognition of tribal land claims. Over the next decade, the treaty is undermined, however, due to prejudice, political bureaucracy, and the demands of settlers. Eventually, a new general is sent to enact a revised and weakened version of the treaty which the tribes refuse to accept. Meanwhile, Lucinda McKeag visits Zendt at the hut and begins a romantic relationship. At McKeag's trading post, Zendt proposes marriage, but only if his future wife learns to read so that she can understand the Bible. Lucinda and her mother go to live with Lise in St. Louis in order to attend school, and despite a romantic fling, she returns to the West. The couple marry, but McKeag dies while dancing with Jacques at their wedding. In 1860, Hans Brumbaugh, a Wolgadeutsche immigrant seeking his fortune, passes through the now thriving Zendt trading post, representing the gold seekers who are also drawn to the area.
5	"The Massacre"	97 minutes	Paul Krasny	Charles Larson	November 11, 1978
By 1861, the Civil War has broken out and the Union sends most of its troops back to fight in the war. While panning in a stream near Zendt's, Brumbaugh discovers gold but is attacked by a crazed fellow prospector and slays the man in self-defence. Discouraged, he then purchases farm land from Zendt. Meanwhile, an embittered zealot called Colonel Frank Skimmerhorn, is tasked to deal with the Indians who he believes are a cursed lost Israeli tribe. After Skimmerhorn arrests Mercy and the Zendts, Clay Basket is shot by a US army soldier when she distracts the Skimmerhorn militia so Mercy can warn her sons. Skimmerhorn then leads a preemptive attack on a band of unarmed Arapaho living in a valley without horses, dogs, and guns. A captain under Skimmerhorn's command refuses to join in the massacre and is court martialed along with Mercy. At the trial, testimony of the massacre turns the court against Skimmerhorn. Released, Mercy rides to the Pasquinel brothers to tell them that their mother has died, and that her dying wish was for them to know that they warn them of the American militant fervor at their heels. On his return to Centennial, Mercy is ambushed by a squad of white US soldiers impersonating a band of Native Americans and shot. Still, he fakes his death and makes the trek back to Centennial, hearing an assailant say "let's get back to headquarters." Skimmerhorn sways the townspeople's anger and resentment over the fabricated Native American attack on Mercy to regain command, continuing his extreme vision of exterminating the Indians. His men lynch Jake Pasquinel. Skimmehorn then shoots and kills Mike Pasquinel as he walks into town, carrying a white flag. Skimmerhorn is exiled from Colorado. In 1868, Zendt, with his old trading post ruined by the militia, erects a store in the new township just as Seccombe, now an agent of Earl Venneford of Wye, returns to the area with a plan to monopolize farmland under the Homestead Act.
6	"The Longhorns"	98 minutes	Virgil W. Vogel	John Wilder	December 3, 1978
A new scramble for watered lands in the region begins, and sharpens as night riders terrorize or kill farmers for their valuable properties. Seccombe hires John Skimmerhorn, son of the disgraced colonel, to acquire longhorn cattle in Texas and to hire a team to drive them back to Colorado. For the cattle drive, the young Skimmerhorn hires a Mexican cook, who then recommends an experienced trail boss, R.J. Poteet, a no-nonsense ex-army captain. Poteet then buys 2,800 cattle, orders a cook's wagon, and recruits a mixed crew of cowboys to brand and then lead them north. Feeling obliged to help the widow of an old friend, Poteet buys 150 head of cattle from her and hires her oldest son, Jim Lloyd, as an additional hand. After paying a "crossing fee" at the ford of 5c per head, the epic cattle drive across the barren Llano Estacado begins. Apart from the lack of water, they encounter run ins with local Apache bands, and in July 1868, they are ambushed near the Arkansas River by ex-Confederate soldiers. However, the 4-month crossing is successful and the cattle populate a new ranch, named Venneford, overseen by Seccombe but managed by Skimmerhorn.
7	"The Shepherds"	93 minutes	Virgil W. Vogel	Charles Larson	December 10, 1978
In 1876, Colorado becomes the 38th state and the growing community around Zendt's Farm, now with a railway station, is renamed "Centennial". By the summer of 1881, with the Indians gone, the range war between the cattle ranchers led by Seccombe and farmers led by Brumbaugh boils over. A number of cowboys from the Skimmerhorn drive now live in town, including Jim Lloyd, who is in love with Zendt's daughter. Looking for extra work, some help Messmore Garrett with his newly arrived flock of sheep. Seccombe, angered by the farmers and shepherds, engages the services of a gang of outlaws, the Pettis brothers. Lloyd and Skimmerhorn, however, initially refuse to believe that Seccombe is behind the subsequent killings. Also in town are the Bucklands on a mission to check their investment at Venneford, which now covers some 6 million acres. Charlotte Buckland falls in love with Seccombe and the two marry. Eventually the outlaws are eliminated by Brumbaugh, Skimmerhorn and Lloyd. Sheriff Axel Dumire is unable to prove their guilt without witnesses and peace is restored to the area. The episode ends when Zendt, whose nephew is visiting, decides to return to Lancaster to see his family again.
8	"The Storm"	94 minutes	Harry Falk	Charles Larson	January 14, 1979
An uneasy peace between the warring factions settles in, watched over by Dumire, as the circus arrives in town, reuniting more members of Skimmerhorn's cattle drive. Seccombe becomes restless as the finances of the ranch are eventually called into question by Venneford's Bristol investors. They dispatch Finlay Perkin, a dour Scottish accountant, to perform the first ever audit of Venneford's books. Noticing irregularities, Perkin requests an actual head count of all the cattle, and soon realizes that Seccombe is selling cattle and demands his resignation. However, Seccombe's crimes are obscured when a blizzard hits the region, killing many of the ranch's remaining cattle, leading to a switch to hardier Hereford stock. Meanwhile, Zendt, after returning from Lancaster, dies in a train accident trying to stop his troubled daughter from fleeing town. The Wendell family, ostensibly itinerant actors but in reality con-artists working their way along the new railroad system, also arrive in town. Knowing their past, Dumire shadows them, but they are helped by Reverend Holly (whom they soon realize they can blackmail).
9	"The Crime"	96 minutes	Harry Falk	Charles Larson	January 21, 1979
The Wendells' favorite con is called the "badger game", which they use on the naive Holly to secure the title to his second house and to blackmail cash. Meanwhile, Seccombe finally accepts defeat and turns over ranch operations to Skimmerhorn who then deputizes Lloyd. Given the prospect of losing all he has worked for, he commits suicide instead. Charlotte Seccombe, now widowed, travels to London briefly but returns to Venneford after inheriting a majority interest in the ranch from her uncle, Lord Venneford, and begins a romance with Lloyd. In the meantime, Dumire grows increasingly suspicious of the Wendells, while their son, Philip, enjoys hanging around the jailhouse. The Wendells try the ruse again on a world wise businessman, Soren Sorenson. He recognizes their trick, and threatens to expose them, but is killed by Maude Wendell. Philip then hides the body in a cave along the riverbank near their house. While looking through his belongings, they find $5,500 that Sorenson was going to use to finance a land purchase, and realize that they cannot spend it immediately as it will expose their guilt.
10	"The Winds of Fortune"	95 minutes	Harry Falk	Charles Larson	January 28, 1979
The new century arrives and Brumbaugh owns a sugar beet processing factory with the byproduct being sold as cattle feed. Dumire remains suspicious of the Wendells and their unexplained finances. Philip, now a telegram delivery boy, admires the diligent and frank sheriff but their relationship is strained over his lack of honesty. One day, the sheriff is fatally wounded by remnants of the Pettis gang from the range war, and Philip begins to tell the truth just as Dumire dies. With the sheriff out of the picture, the Wendells are now free from legal investigation. Mervin Wendell meets a Union Pacific land agent and decides to set up a real estate office. Meanwhile, troubles in the mines in Santa Ynez, Chihuahua, lead to the death of Nacho Gomez, the Mexican cook, and the arrival of Tranquilino Marquez to work for Brumbaugh. Lloyd's engagement falls apart when Clemma Zendt, now divorced, finally returns and begins reciprocating his affections. Seccombe resolves to fight for her fiance and blackmails Zendt into leaving town again. Lloyd and Seccombe then reconcile and wed and Skimmerhorn leaves to work on a ranch with Poteet.
11	"The Winds of Death"	99 minutes	Bernard McEveety	Charles Larson, Jerry Ziegman	February 3, 1979
By 1911, Mervin Wendell has grown rich selling marginal land to naive settlers for dryland farming, lending on the land at extortion rates then foreclosing and reselling the land at a profit. Among those are young Iowans Earl and Alice Grebe. Despite warnings at the station from Brumbaugh and Lloyd, the Grebes and others settle on the drylands and take out a mortgage with Wendell. The gamble eventually sours as unsuitable farming practices, a drop in wheat prices after World War I, and the Dust Bowl years of the 1920s and 1930s set in. In 1933, the Grebes fall behind in their taxes and mortgage and Philip Wendell threatens foreclosure. Incessant winds and dust storms kill the Grebe's son while also causing Alice Grebe to slowly go insane, leading to the death of her family. Throughout this time, Charlotte Lloyd uses her wealth and influence to support the community, including protecting Hispanic workers and their families from discrimination. Beeley Garrett, who had married the Lloyd's daughter some time earlier, takes over full management of the ranch when Jim Lloyd dies.
12	"The Scream of Eagles"	147 minutes	Virgil W. Vogel	John Wilder	February 4, 1979
The final episode, a summary of the series mainly in flashback, moves the story to the present. In 1978, Professor Lewis Vernor arrives in town to do research on the history of Centennial and is met by writer Sidney Enderman. By then, the two leading citizens in town are Morgan Wendell and Paul Garrett (the narrator and a direct descendant of many of the characters in the series). Both men are in their 50s: Garrett, the current owner of Venneford, is interested in preserving the natural beauty of Colorado; Wendell, the heir to the family real estate business, however, has a propensity for self-interest. While exploring the town, Vernor meets Wendell at an excavation for a new bridge. Wendell, recognizing the scene from his father's tales, then removes skeletal evidence of the Sorensen murder, witnessed by Vernor from afar. After Wendell leaves, Vernor returns to the excavation site and drops down into the now exposed cave. After a brief search, Vernor discovers a single bone, which Sidney takes to have analyzed. Wendell is also a candidate for the new statewide office of Commissioner of Resources, which he plans to use to greatly expand industry in the state regardless of environmental impact. While reciting the history of Centennial to Vernor, Garrett feels persuaded to run against Wendell. After a trial over illegal eagle, bear, and turkey hunting, Wendell encourages Garrett's reputation to be smeared by people opposed to his conservationist views and relationships with Hispanics, specifically his romance with the sister of the local cantina owner. Garrett and Vernor then discuss the various historical and contemporary issues surrounding the people in and around Centennial, including "this nation's unique moral headache" - contemporary Indian social issues. In a TV debate, the candidates square off, and argue the merits of development and conservation and of balancing resources. Analysis of the bone that Vernor found confirms it as human, forcing Vernor and Sidney to realize that the rumors of how the Wendells gained their family fortune as true. The series ends with the election results showing a return swing in Garrett's favor, before fading to a montage of the people and places of the series.

== Production ==
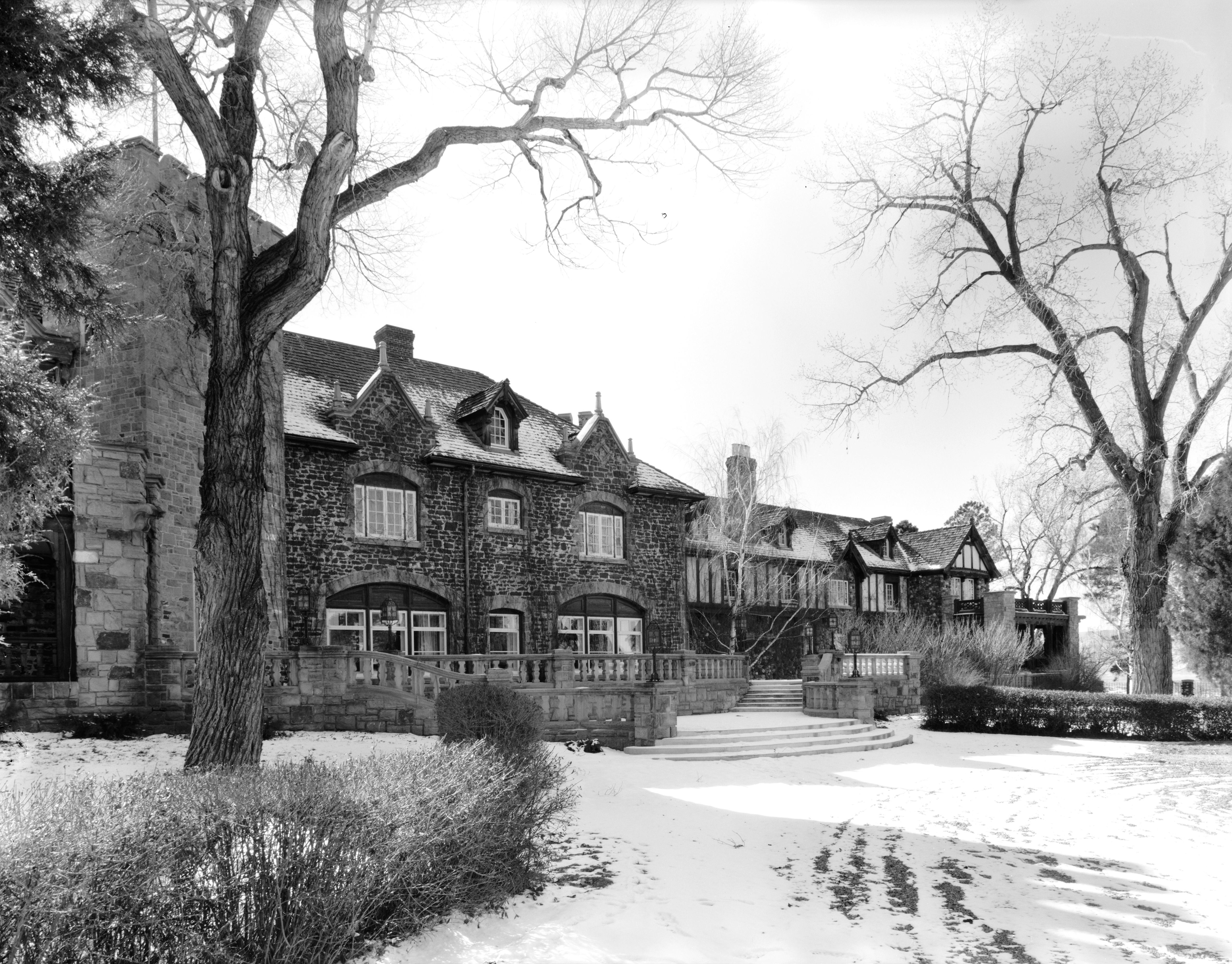
Highlands Ranch Mansion

Principal filming occurred in 1978. There were numerous filming locations in several parts of the United States. Colorado filming locations included Greeley, the Pawnee National Grasslands, Denver, Central City, Orchard, Bent's Old Fort National Historic Site and the Rocky Mountain National Park. Several of the mountain men era scenes were filmed in Grand Teton National Park in Wyoming. The scenes representing St. Louis in the late 18th and early 19th century were filmed in Augusta, Kentucky. The White Hall State Historic Site in Richmond, Kentucky served as the Bockweiss mansion. Scenes representing the Zendt farm and Lancaster County, Pennsylvania, were filmed in and around Coshocton, Ohio.

The ranch house and surrounding buildings used for the Venneford Ranch house was the Highlands Ranch Mansion in Highlands Ranch, which is located near the real town of Centennial, Colorado. Years later the surrounding property was developed for housing by the Mission Viejo Company. One of the streets in the development was named Venneford Ranch Road.

The Great Western Railway engine No. 75 was back-dated for scenes in the 1880s and then modernized for scenes in the 1910s.

On November 27, 1978, actor Richard Kelton died on location south of Denver after one day of shooting his scenes. Cast as the adult character of Philip Wendell, Kelton's death was the result of accidental carbon monoxide asphyxiation due to improper ventilation in his dressing room trailer. Universal Studios, which produced the mini-series, was fined $720 for the failure to provide a proper ventilation system for the trailer where Kelton was rehearsing his lines. His wife received a $50,000 settlement per a statute in California Workers Compensation Law.

=== Differences between the book and miniseries ===
Although Michener began his novel in prehistory, the series itself begins with elements from Chapter 4 of his book, "The Many Coups of Lame Beaver". The Wendells use the badger game to blackmail the town pastor out of his house in the miniseries, but in the book they get the house from a local businessman. The novel devotes an entire section to Kurt Brumbaugh's development of Central Beet company; the miniseries, however, makes only passing reference to it.

In the miniseries, Morgan Wendell tries to cover up his family's shady history, but in the book he speaks openly about the murder and his father's admiration of the sheriff to the author–who in turn agrees to publish the facts of the killing after the election. Paul Garrett is in his 50s and is Lloyd's grandson in the miniseries, but he is in his early 40s in the novel and is their great-grandson. The miniseries skips a generation for the sake of simplicity. This skipped generation would have revealed that Garrett is also a descendant of Maxwell and Lisette Mercy, Levi and Lucinda Zendt, and John Skimmerhorn.

There is no election pitting Garrett against Wendell in the novel. Wendell is elected Commissioner of Resources, and Garrett reluctantly accepts his offer to be his principal deputy. The novel also portrays Wendell as a more reasonable and balanced man than what is depicted in the miniseries. It is he, not Garrett, who makes the reference to Warren G. Harding as the anti-standard by which all politicians should be judged.

=== Historical basis ===
The Pasquinel character bears similarities to Jacques La Ramee, a French-Canadian, coureur de bois, fur trapper who explored the region, of the North Platte River, in southern Wyoming, in the early 19th century. The "Pasquinel brothers", the sons of Pasquinel and Clay Basket, are loosely-based on the four half-breed sons of trader William Bent, of Old Bent's Fort, near present-day La Junta, Colorado. During "The Yellow Apron", Pasquinel tells his son Jake that he was named after his good friend and early trapping partner, "Jacques La Ramee".

The character of Indian hater and religious fanatic Colonel Frank Skimmerhorn appears to be loosely based on John Chivington, a disgraced ex-Methodist minister who led the infamous Sand Creek massacre in Kiowa County, Colorado in 1864. The miniseries however seems to imply that the Skimmerhorn character is a Mormon since he refers to the Arapaho as "Lamanites", a term found in Mormon theology to refer to Indians, but not in Protestant or Roman Catholic doctrine. Captain John McIntosh's (Major Mercy in the novel) role in the incident and subsequent trial appears to be loosely based on Silas Soule.

The range war depicted in the series is similar in many respects to the 1892 Johnson County War in Wyoming. The scene where Nate Person, Bufe Coker, and Fat Laura are murdered by hired killers, the Pettis brothers, bears similarity to the lynching of Ellen "Cattle Kate" Watson with the Oliver Seccombe character taking a role similar to that of Albert John Bothwell. The character of Hans "Potato" Brumbaugh appears to be loosely based on the Colorado historical figure Rufus "Potato" Clark, a failed gold prospector who turned to agriculture and became a pioneer in irrigation. Like the character in Centennial, Clark grew wealthy by growing potatoes near Littleton, eventually switching to sugar beets and controlling more than 20,000 acres (80 km^{2}).

Despite the name and location, the city of Centennial, Colorado was founded in 2001 and is not based on the novel, but rather was independently inspired by Colorado's 1876 statehood.

== Broadcast ==
Centennial originally aired during the 1978–1979 television season. It re-aired in the fall of the 1980–1981 season during the 1980 actors' strike which delayed the availability of new programs.

== Awards and nominations ==
Year	Award	Result	Category	Recipient
1979	Chicago International Film Festival	Winner	Network Television Production: Television Series	John Wilder
1979	Emmy Awards	Nominated	Outstanding Film Editing for a Limited Series or a Special	Robert Watts (For chapter one: "Only the Rocks Live Forever")
1979	Emmy Awards	Nominated	Outstanding Art Direction for a Limited Series or a Special	John W. Corso (art director), John M. Dwyer (set decorator), Robert George Freer (set decorator), Sherman Loudermilk (art director), Jack Senter (production designer), Joseph J. Stone (set decorator) (For chapter seven: "The Shepherds")
1979	Western Heritage Awards	Won	Fictional Television Drama	John Wilder
1979	Writers Guild of America Award	Won	Multi-Part Long Form Series and/or Any Production of More Than Two Parts	John Wilder (For chapter one: "Only the Rocks Live Forever")
1980	Golden Globe Award	Nominated	Best TV-Series – Drama	-
1980	Golden Globe Award	Nominated	Best TV Actor – Drama	Richard Chamberlain
