= The Collection at RiverPark =

Coordinates: 34°14′26″N 119°10′38″W

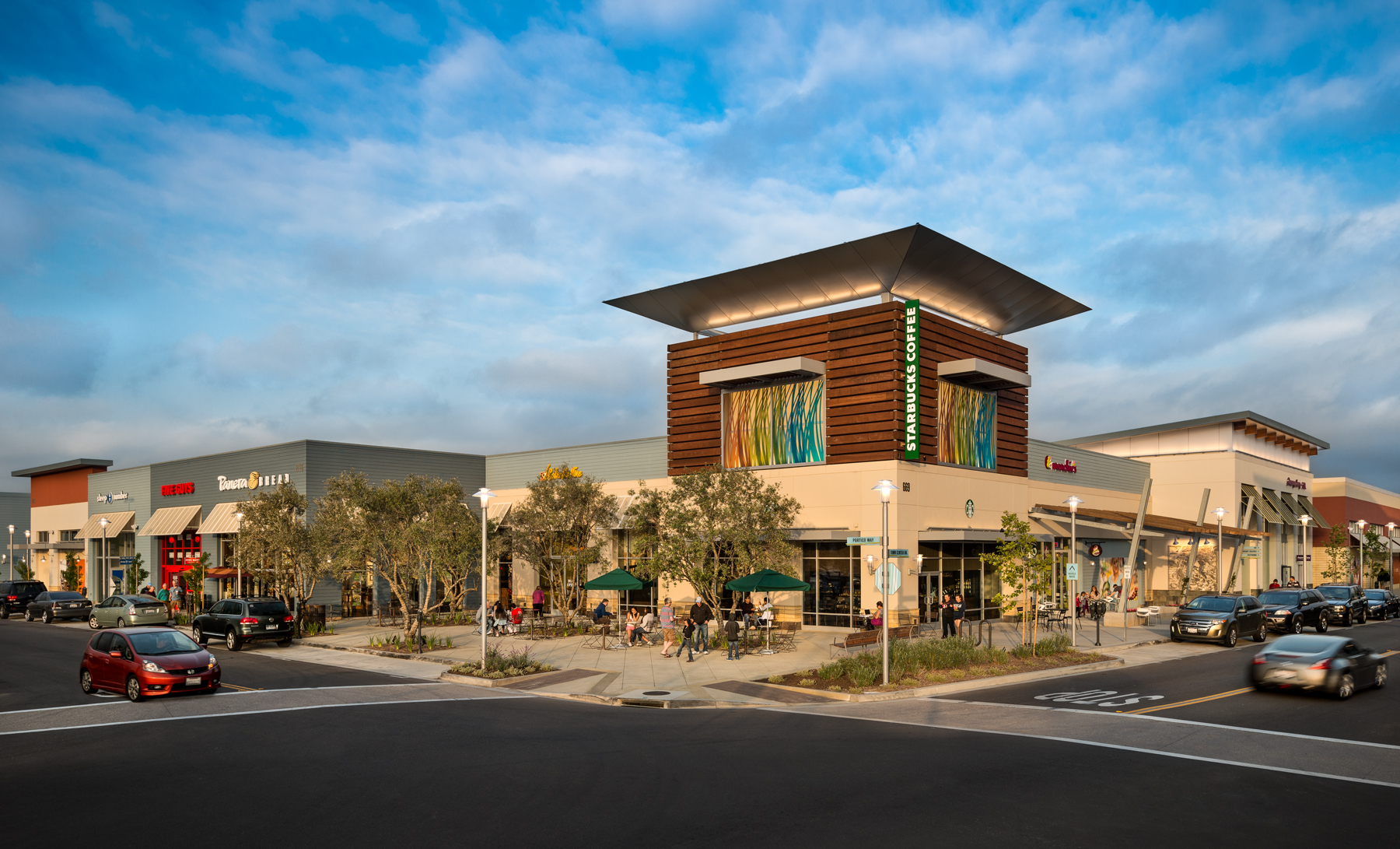
- The Collection at RiverPark
- Location: Oxnard, California, U.S.
- Opened: November 15, 2012
- Developer: Shea Properties
- Manager: CenterCal Properties LLC
- Architect: Altoon Partners
- Num. of anchor tenants: 5
- Floor area: 650,000 sq ft (60,000 m^{2})
- Website: thecollectionrp.com

The Collection at RiverPark is an outdoor lifestyle center in Oxnard, California, United States, located east of U.S. Route 101. The shopping center held its grand opening on November 15, 2012, and is anchored by Target, Whole Foods Market, REI, The Container Store, and a 16-screen Cinemark movie theater. Originally planned to open in 2008, The Collection was delayed due to the Great Recession.

== Tenants ==
The Collection at RiverPark features a mix of national and region businesses, ranging from grocery stores and beauty salons to traditional mall tenants. Notable retailers include Target, Whole Foods, REI, H&M, Victoria's Secret, and ULTA Beauty.

Restaurant tenants include Cheesecake Factory, Yard House, Lazy Dog Restaurant & Bar, Panera Bread, and Starbucks Coffee.

== Public art ==
The Collection features several public art installations. The developer, Shea Properties, spent about $1 million on art projects for the center. Frank Romero, Michael Amescua, Frank Bauer, Kevin Newman, Peter Shire, Susan Stinsmuehlen-Amend, and Sammy Silberstein contributed to the art program.

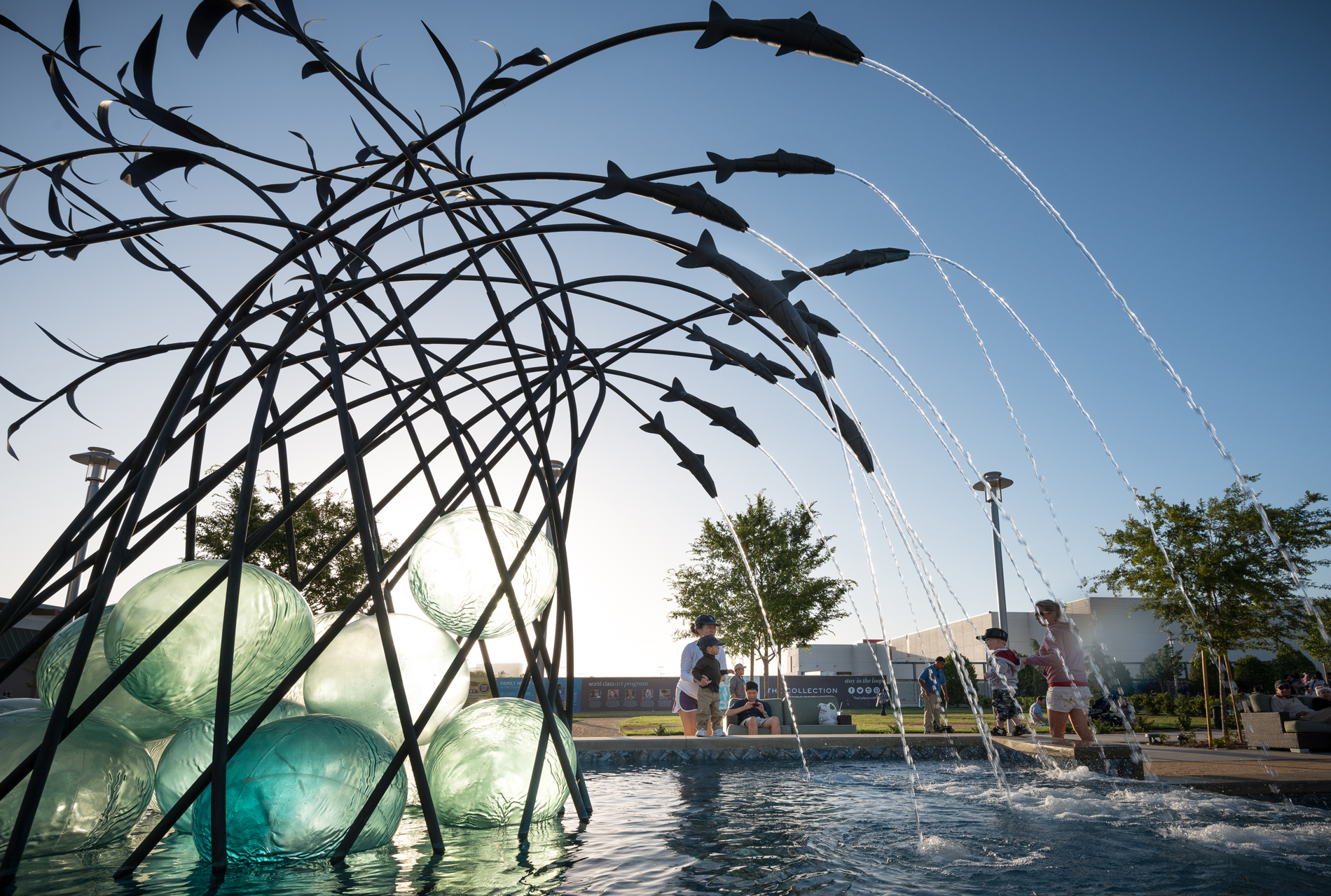
Coastal Conversion

Name	Artist	Medium	Location
"Urban Expressionism"	Sammy Silberstein	Photographic Prints on Aluminum	2751 Park View Court
"Charting a Course"	Stephen Schafer & Tyson Cline	Folded Metal Kinetic 3D Mural	Collection Blvd between Park View Court and Portico Way
"Coastal Conversion"	Susan Stinsmuehlen-Amend	Bronze, Copper, Stainless Steel, Fountain	Collection Park
"At The Beach"	Michael Amescua	Cut Staineless Steel Sculpture	Collection Blvd and Park View Court
"Sunset"	Frank Bauer	Mosaic Tile	Collection Blvd
"Las Sirenas Del Concierto"	Peter Shire	Ceramic Tile and Stainless Steel	Seaglass Way and Collection Blvd
"The Aquarium"	Frank Bauer	Tile Mural	Town Center Drive
"Medallion 2"	Kevin Newman and Frank Bauer	Tile	Town Center Drive
"Sunny Oxnard"	Frank Romero	Ceramic Tile Mural	Town Center Drive and Park View Court
"La Playa"	Frank Romero	Ceramic Tile Mural	Town Center Drive and Park View Court
"Shopping List"	Susan Stinsmuehlen-Amend	Porcelain Tile Mural	In-between highway 101 and Town Center Drive
"Chumash Water Goddess"	Michael Amescua	Cut Stainless Steel Sculpture	Town Center Drive and Portico Way
"Medallion 1"	Kevin Newman and Frank Bauer	Cut Stainless Steel Sculpture	Town Center Drive and Park View Court
"Salmon Run"	Michael Amescua	Cut Stainless Steel Sculpture	Park View Court
"Full Moon"	Michael Amescua	Cut Stainless Steel Sculpture	Park View Court
"La Ballena"	Michael Amescua	Cut Stainless Steel Sculpture	Park View Court
