= J. F. Shea Co. =

American construction and real estate company

J. F. Shea Co., Inc.
- Type: Private
- Industry: Real estate, construction
- Founded: 1881; 145 years ago in Portland, Oregon
- Founder: John F. Shea
- Headquarters: Walnut, California, United States
- Area served: United States.
- Key people: John F. Shea (founder); Peter Shea Jr (CEO)
- Services: Home construction; Commercial construction; Civil engineering; Property development and management
- Website: jfshea.com

The J. F. Shea Co., Inc. is one of the largest privately held construction and real estate companies in the United States. J. F. Shea comprises a collection of companies including Shea Homes, Shea Properties, Shea Ventures, J. F. Shea Construction, Reed Manufacturing, and Bluestar Resort & Golf.

== History ==
J. F. Shea Co., was founded in 1881 in Portland, Oregon, by John Francis Shea. The J. F. Shea Company's activities include new-home construction, commercial construction, civil engineering, commercial and multi-family property development and management, construction materials and venture capital. The JF Shea Company's projects include the building of the diversion channels for the Hoover Dam, the foundations for the Golden Gate and Oakland Bay bridges, the tunnels for San Francisco's Bay Area Rapid Transit (BART) system and tunnel work for The Metro Crenshaw/LAX Transit Corridor and the Metro Purple Line Extension.

=== 1920s–1930s ===
J. F. Shea Co. constructed the Portland harbor wall on the Willamette River. J. F. Shea completed the Mokelumne pipeline, which transported water to Oakland and Berkley. During the 1930s, J. F. Shea built the foundation piers for the Golden Gate Bridge in San Francisco and assisted in the construction of the San Francisco-Oakland Bay Bridge. The company also served as the construction manager for the Hoover Dam.

The outbreak of World War II diverted the attention of nearly all types of businesses, forcing them to respond to the different conditions and demands of a country at war. J. F Shea spent the war years building liberty ships and shipyards.

=== 1960s–1970s ===
J. F. Shea constructed tunnels and stations for the San Francisco Bay Area Rapid Transit (BART) system. The company also managed tunneling efforts for Metro, the subway system in Washington, D.C. In the 1970s, the company formed Shea Properties, which would oversee commercial development, including retail centers, apartments, office buildings and industrial parks.

== J. F. Shea Co., Companies ==
- Shea Homes
- Shea Properties
- Trilogy
- Shea Mortgage
- Blue Star Resort & Golf
- J. F. Shea Construction
- Reed Manufacturing
- UMC
- Shea Ventures
