= Transportation Expansion Project =

Project in Denver

The Transportation Expansion (T-REX) Project was a $1.67 billion project aimed at improving transportation options for commuters in the Denver metro area within the areas of Interstate 25 and 225, which was recognized as the 14th busiest intersection in the United States at the time. The T-REX effort widened major interstates to up to 5 mainline lanes in each direction and added 19 miles (31 km) of double-track light rail throughout the metropolitan area (40 miles (64 km) total). The T-REX project finished 3.2% under its $1.67 billion budget and 22 months ahead of schedule in 2006.

The T-REX project is one of the first transportation projects in the US to use a design-build contract in which the same contractor is responsible for the project's engineering and construction. Under this type of contract, the contracting agency provides a general concept of the plan, and the contractor is responsible for most of the details, many of which are worked out as the project proceeds.

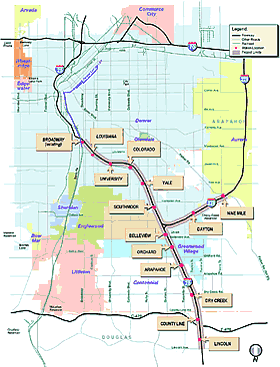
Map of affected areas.

The T-REX corridor carries more than 280,000 vehicles per day and connects the two largest employment centers in the region: Downtown Denver and the Denver Tech Center.

== Funding ==
The TABOR laws enacted in 1992 disallowed the T-REX from being funded by state, county, city or gas taxes. The state of Colorado was also hesitant in collecting mandatory additional tax from its residents. Metropolitan areas that would benefit from the expansion voted to approve an increase of property taxes required for the build-out. In November 1999, voters in affected municipalities approved two property-tax increases which partially funded the transit portion of the project.

Among those were:

- Design-build contract with Southeast Corridor Constructors worth $1.18 billion.
- Light rail costs: $879 million, with $437 million coming from RTD and local matching funds; $525 million from an FTA full-funding grant agreement.
- Highway costs: $795 million, from highway users taxes and matching federal revenue.
- 34 new light-rail vehicles: $91.8 million.
- Elati Street Light Rail Maintenance Facility: $39.5 million.

== History ==
A 1992 traffic congestion study commissioned by the Denver Regional Council of Governments (DRCOG) found that traffic volume along the corridor had exceeded its maximum capacity of 180,000 vehicles per day and, within a few years from the time of the study, the freeway would be near gridlock most of the day. Adding to the gloomy forecast of gridlock, planners projected that 150,000 new jobs would be added in the downtown area and at the huge Denver Tech Center, which is 15 miles (24 kilometers) to the south, over the next 20 years. The study recommended widening the freeway by several lanes, and suggested incorporating mass transit options into any future improvements.

In April 1995, The Colorado Department of Transportation and RTD started a partnership that became T-REX. The two agencies and DRCOG commissioned the Southeast Corridor Major Investment Study (MIS), which investigated solutions to the I-25/I-225 congestion problem. Arapahoe and Douglas counties along with the cities of Denver, Aurora, and Greenwood Village participated in the initial MIS. Two other Denver-area corridor studies were also initiated.

The initial MIS was primarily transit-oriented in scope. The recommendations included light rail, highway improvements, pedestrian/bicycle facility improvements, enhanced Transportation Demand Management (TDM), Intelligent transportation system (ITS) measures. It also recommended safety improvements such as acceleration and deceleration lanes and wider shoulders. The initial MIS did not call for additional highway lanes. The Federal Highway Administration and CDOT did not agree with this omission, and leaders of all four agencies thought that the MIS placed too much emphasis on transit. Mobility was instead focused on, and the agencies focused on "highway and transit as coordinated pieces of a comprehensive strategy to maximize mobility in a project with limited available right of way", which led to the creation of T-REX.

A second, more comprehensive MIS was completed two years later. Unlike the initial study, the scope included Core Infrastructure (Highway) improvements as well as Transit solutions. It recommended expanding highway lanes up to 7 wide in each direction as well as adding light rail support throughout the corridor. Additionally, the cities of Lone Tree, Parker and Centennial were also included for input and feedback. DRCOG adopted the recommendations of the 1997 Study which included the 19 miles (31 km) of double-track light rail and 13 stations with the track running next to or in the median of I-25 and I-225.

In November 1998, DRCOG adopted a 20-year regional transportation plan called Metro Vision 2020. T-REX was a top priority in the plan.

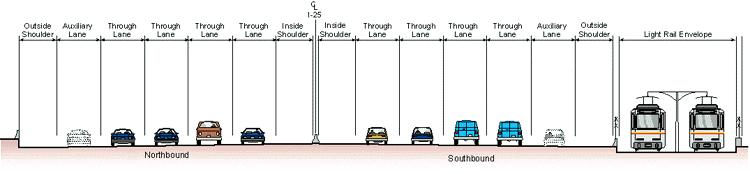
Lane Configurations for I-25 looking south, from Evans to Yale (Source:Federal Highway Administration Planning Toolkit - Case Study - Colorado)

Planning for the project began in June 1999. The passage of a law allowing the state Department of Transportation (CDOT) to use Transportation Revenue Anticipation Notes to borrow money based on federal funds the state had not yet been approved. The Colorado Department of Transportation (CDOT), Regional Transportation District (RTD), Federal Highway Administration and Federal Transit Administration soon signed a "Partnering Agreement" to work on the project, and voters approved the plan to run light rail through the corridor. Southeast Corridor Constructors, a joint venture between Omaha, Nebraska-based Kiewit Construction and Pasadena, CA-based Parsons Transportation Group won the design-build contract in May 2001. Construction began only a few months later in June 2001.

The "Partnering Agreement" was a key to the success of the project. Signed by all stakeholders, it established four primary goals:

- Minimize inconvenience to the community, motorists, and public (working during off hours of between 9pm and 5am).
- Complete the project within the budget of $1.67 billion.
- Provide a quality project.
- Complete the project by the operational deadline of June 30, 2008.

A Policy Committee was founded to provide input on policy-related issues and monitored project progress relative to the overall public agency decision-making process, and a Technical Committee focused on all planning, engineering and environmental issues and assisted in the development and refinement of alternatives. Members of this committee were individuals from the various cities and jurisdictions within the study area who had a technical background.

The two committees used goals from the "Partnering Agreement" to refine and evaluate each alternative. Public meetings and numerous workshops were held during NEPA (National Environmental Policy Act) to present the definition of alternatives and to guide the Colorado Department of Transportation and RTD in the development and evaluation of any Preferred Alternatives. Committee members primarily consisted of elected and/or appointed policy/decision-making officials from the affected areas. After the adoption of the MIS, all four agencies in June 1998 signed a "partnering charter" that created a leadership team to identify and pursue the best multi-modal solutions.

To keep the public updated, a project newsletter was issued at significant project milestones. The committees remained intact during the NEPA and preliminary engineering process, and monthly meetings were held to keep them involved. Press releases and a media tour were utilized to keep the project in the media, and project displays were placed in public buildings to keep the public informed. A project website was continuously updated with the latest documents and information. Project team members met over 215 times with community groups.

By the end of 2002, the T-REX Project acquired six single-family homes, two duplexes, and two apartment buildings. It negotiated 30 total acquisitions and 172 partial acquisitions with a $100 million budget. Businesses were eligible for replacement property costs and moving costs. The T-REX Project also purchased business properties.

T-REX's five-year design-build project added 19 miles (31 km) of light rail and improved 17 miles (27 km) of highway through southeast Denver, Aurora, Greenwood Village, Centennial and Lone Tree. Construction began in Fall 2001 and construction ended in December 2006, 22 months ahead of the original schedule. Additionally, light rail service along the Southeast Corridor began in late 2006.

=== Decision for light rail instead of HOV lanes ===
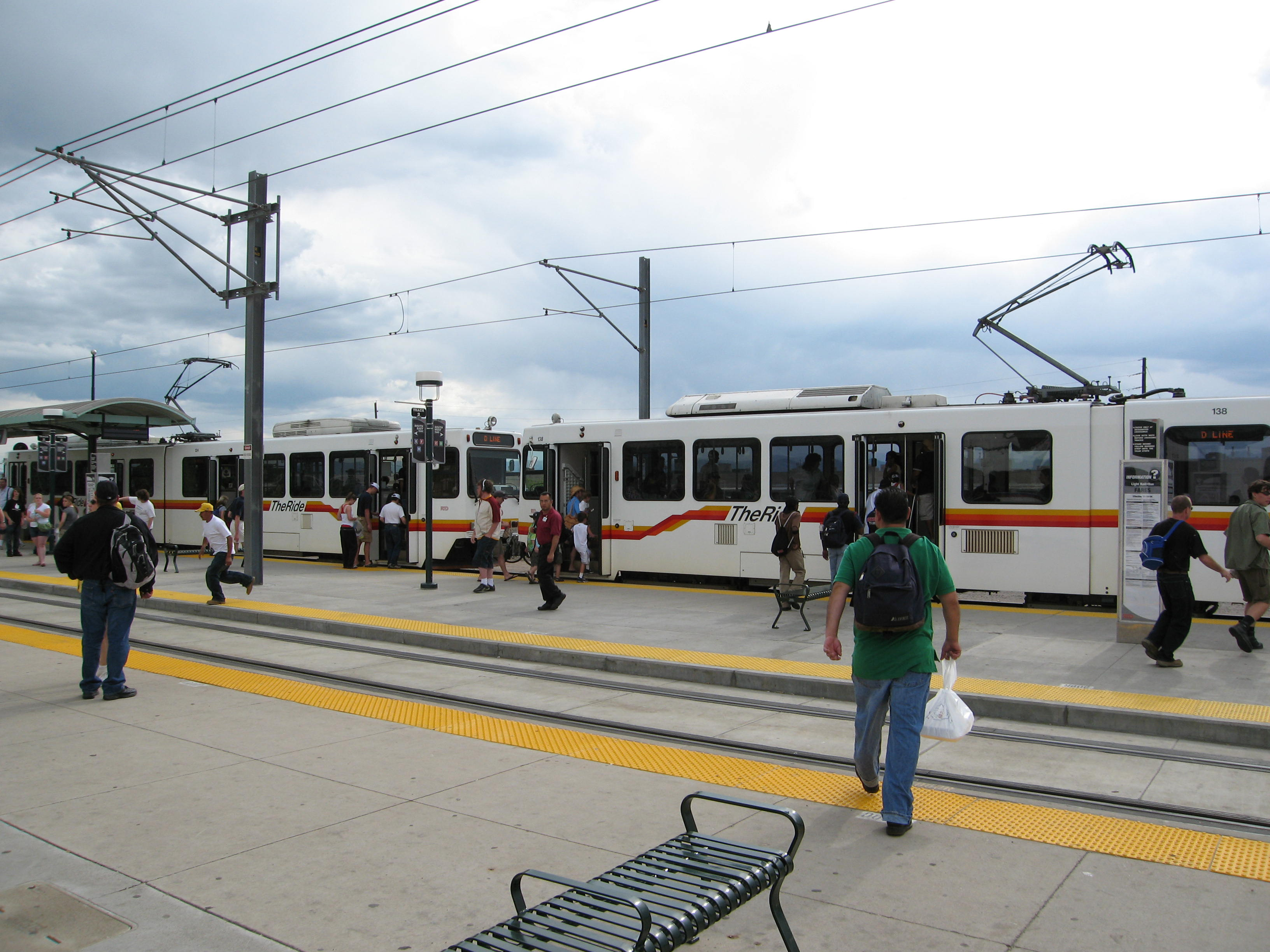
I-25 & Broadway Light Rail Station

Light rail transit was endorsed because of the following reasons according to the T-REX factbook:

- Light rail has significantly less impact to existing residences and businesses in the corridor and to natural resources, such as wetlands, parks, and historic properties.
- Light rail has the greatest potential carrying capacity.
- Light rail has the best travel time.
- Light rail requires the lowest investment per user.
- Light rail had stronger potential for joint development.
- Light rail is the most reliable and safe option.
- Light rail had stronger community support.

Denver Mayor John Hickenlooper believes that light rail presents an effective solution to congestion, as the addition of more highway lanes often results in rapid occupancy by additional vehicles. Due to the capacity of light rail carts in comparison to cars, increasing the capacity of the rail line can accommodate more traffic without causing a slowdown.

== Timeline ==
- April 1995 — Southeast Corridor Major Investment Study (MIS) begins. Recommends 19-mile (31-kilometer), 13-station light-rail extension and major safety improvements (but no additional lanes) to I-25/I-225.
- October 1997 — Denver Regional Council of Governments adopts MIS.
- March 1998 — Public meetings begin for project's environmental impact statement (EIS).
- November 1999 — Voters approve two bond measures that pave the way for project financing.
- December 1999 — Final EIS signed.
- March 2000 — Record of decision issued.
- July 2000 —T-REX begins qualifying contractors for bidding.
- November 2000 —FTA awards $525 million full-funding agreement. Request for proposal released to qualified bidders.
- May 2001 — Southeast Corridor Project renamed Transportation Expansion Project (T-REX). Southeast Corridor Constructors, a Kiewit-Parsons team, selected to build the project.
- June 2001 — Contract awarded; notice to proceed issued.
- September 24, 2001 — Groundbreaking.
- October 2001 — Construction begins.
- March 27, 2004 — Bridges at I-225 and I-25 demolished after an implosion attempt brought down only one of the two bridges.
- April 2006 — RTD Began advertising the T-Rex project on its website which announced the opening day.
- July 2006 — Station signs added.
- October 2006 — RTD offered discounted fares during the first week of the opening day.
- November 17, 2006 — Completed and opened.

== Results ==
1.5 million US gallons (5,700 m^{3}) of motor fuel and related air pollution that is worth about $4 million per year is estimated to be saved due to the project. The linking of I-25 into Denver's two major employment centers downtown and the Denver Tech Center where more than 200,000 people work decreased commute times for residents. Regional growth is estimated to add another 150,000 jobs in DTC and downtown over the next 20 years, according to the Denver Regional Council of Governments, a multi-county oversight group. Denver Mayor John Hickenlooper and former Governor Bill Owens proposed the "Mission of Economic Development", which encourages companies to relocate to the corresponding areas developed by the T-REX project.

=== Infrastructure results ===
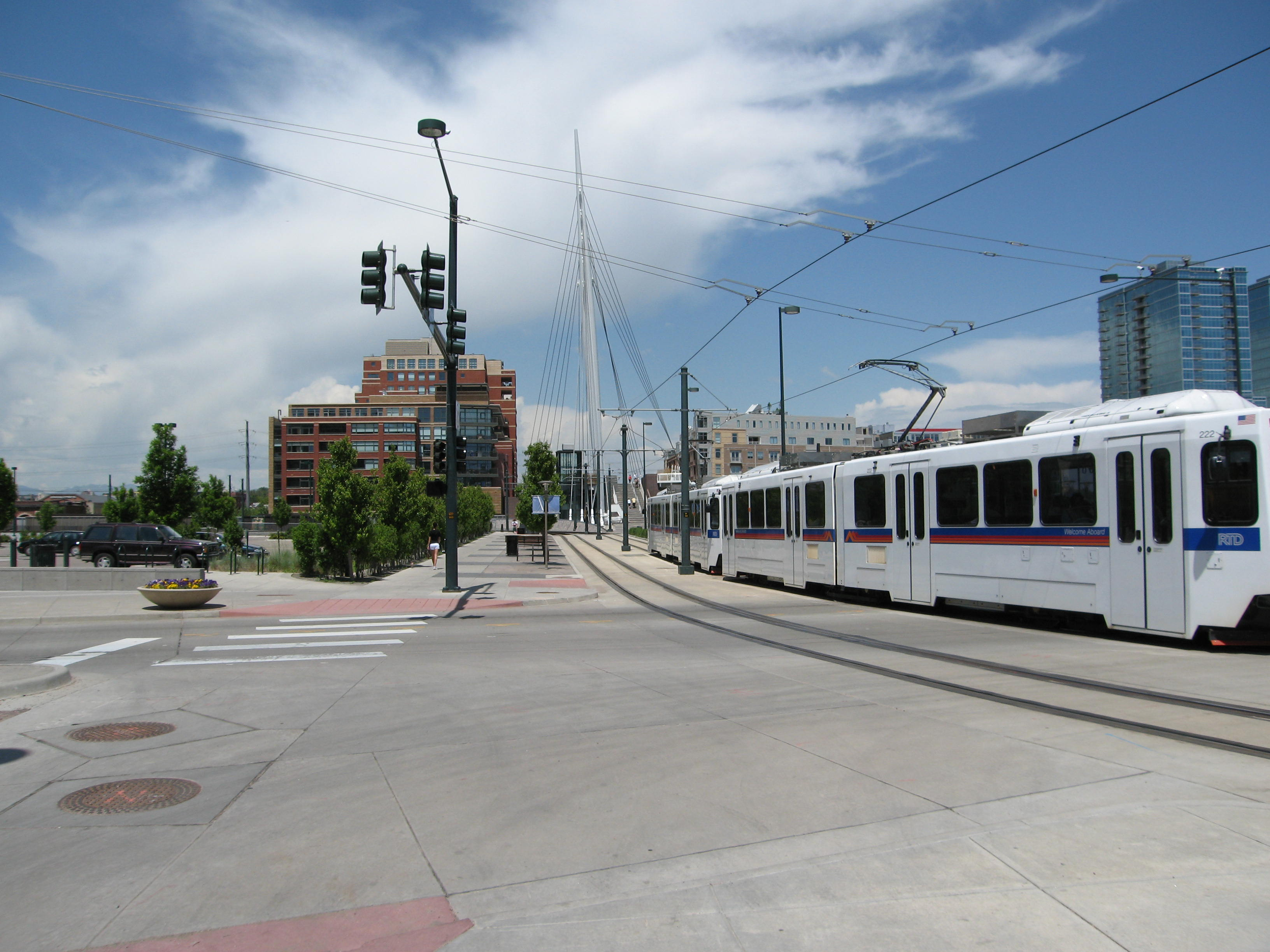
RTD-operated Light Rail running near Union Station. Note: This intersection has been removed.

- One additional lane added in each direction on most sections; two additional lanes in most congested areas.
- Reconstructed eight interchanges at the I-25/I-225 interchange, which was ranked the 14th most congested interchange in the nation.
- Completed reconstruction of "Narrows" (Broadway to Steele streets).
- Replacement or rehabilitation of 18 bridges.
- Acceleration and deceleration lanes added throughout the section.
- Shoulders widened where feasible.
- Implementation of Transportation Demand Management (TDM) solutions which assist on-ramp timing.
- Intelligent Transportation Systems (ITS) which allowed ExpressToll, a form of electronic toll collection, to collect toll for single-person capacity usage while in the HOV lanes.
- Major drainage upgrades.
- Added 19 miles (31 km) of double-track light rail connecting to the existing system at Broadway in Denver and extending along the west side of I-25 to Lincoln Avenue in Douglas County and in the median of I-225 from I-25 to Parker Road in Aurora.
- 13 stations with Bus Transit available at 12 of the stations.
- 34 additional light rail vehicles were added to RTD's fleet.
- Constructed a new light rail maintenance facility in Englewood.

On Interstate 25:

- Added one through lane in each direction from Logan Street to I-225 (for a total of four lanes each way).
- Added two through lanes in each direction from I-225 to the C470/E470 interchange (for a total of five lanes each way).

On Interstate 225:

- Added one through lane in each direction from Parker Road in Aurora to I-25 (for a total of three lanes each way).
- Reconstructed and widened numerous bridges.
- Improved drainage.
- Enhanced safety.
- Added and improved shoulders.
- Improve ramps and acceleration/deceleration lanes.

== Similar projects ==
The reconstruction of Interstate 15 for the 2002 Winter Olympics in Salt Lake City, a joint development by UDOT and the Utah Transit Authority, was a model for the T-REX project. The project similarly involved a combination of light-rail and roadwork. Unlike T-REX, Utah's rail line were not in the interstates right of way.

Representatives from the Arizona Department of Transportation, the Maricopa Association of Governments and the Valley Metro Rail system in Phoenix observed T-REX. Phoenix is in the early stages of a similar project on its Interstate 10 corridor, one that also involves expanding the highway and building more rail lines. While Phoenix's light-rail project will not be complete until around 2019, the highway improvements are planned to be completed in the next five years. Like T-Rex, Valley Metro plans to run its rail lines in the highway's right-of-way. Wisconsin Department of Transportation has considered implementing design-build strategies into future projects.

A secondary project, the FasTracks, was publicly supported during the 2004 election, which may be related to the success of the T-REX.

== Reception ==
The public was generally in favor of the project. There was some opposition from property owners who opposed the outright taking of, or encroachment onto their property. According to T-REX, relocation was supported by relocation experts. Public input did result in minor changes to the project, including light rail alignment and station locations. Political support may also have been a factor in the expediting of the project. Colorado Governor Roy Romer supported the project from the outset, and there was local political support for the implementation of the light rail. However, some local politicians and special interest groups were against the expansion of the highway.

Some consider it to be one of the most successful transportation upgrade projects in the United States. It also received a National Design-Build Award from the Design-Build Institute of America.

== See also ==
- Colorado Department of Transportation
- Denver Regional Council of Governments
- Light rail
- Mass transit
- State highways in Colorado
- State of Colorado
