= Shea Properties =

American real estate company

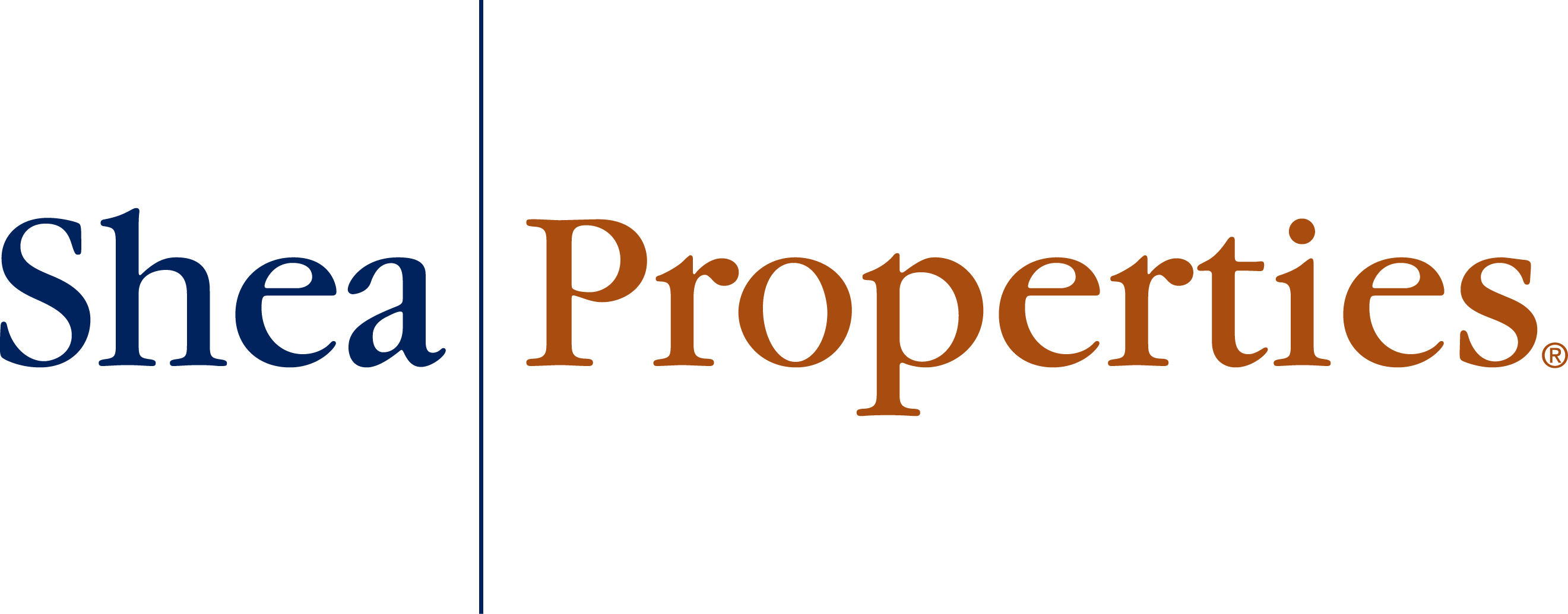
- Type: Subsidiary
- Industry: Real estate
- Founded: 1970s
- Headquarters: Aliso Viejo, California, United States
- Area served: California, Colorado, Washington
- Key people: Colm Macken (CEO)
- Parent: J.F. Shea Co.
- Website: sheaproperties.com

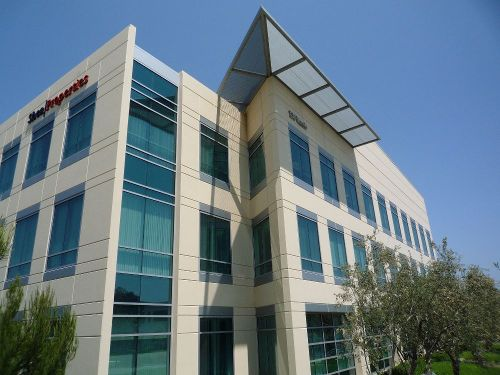
Shea Properties Headquarters

Shea Properties is an American real estate company based in Aliso Viejo, California, and a subsidiary of the family-owned construction and development group J.F. Shea Co. It develops, owns and manages apartment buildings, shopping centres, office and industrial space, and mixed-use schemes in California, Colorado and Washington.

== History ==
J.F. Shea Co. was founded in 1881 in Portland, Oregon, by John Francis Shea as a plumbing business, and later became a heavy-construction contractor; among its projects were work on the Hoover Dam, the foundations of the Golden Gate Bridge and the San Francisco–Oakland Bay Bridge, and tunnelling for the Bay Area Rapid Transit system.

The group diversified from the 1960s onwards, forming the homebuilder Shea Homes and, in the 1970s, Shea Properties, which was given responsibility for commercial and multi-family investment and development. Shea Properties initially operated in California and later expanded into Colorado.

== Operations and acquisitions ==
In 1997, J.F. Shea Co. acquired the Mission Viejo Company from Philip Morris Companies. The purchase included about 900 acres in the Mission Viejo, Aliso Viejo and Rancho Santa Margarita areas of Orange County and more than 22,000 acres at Highlands Ranch, Colorado.

In 2006, Shea Properties purchased of the Denver Technological Center and Meridian International Business Center. Currently, the company operates in Northern and South Southern California, Colorado and Washington.
