= Plante Moran =

US audit, tax, consulting, and wealth management firm

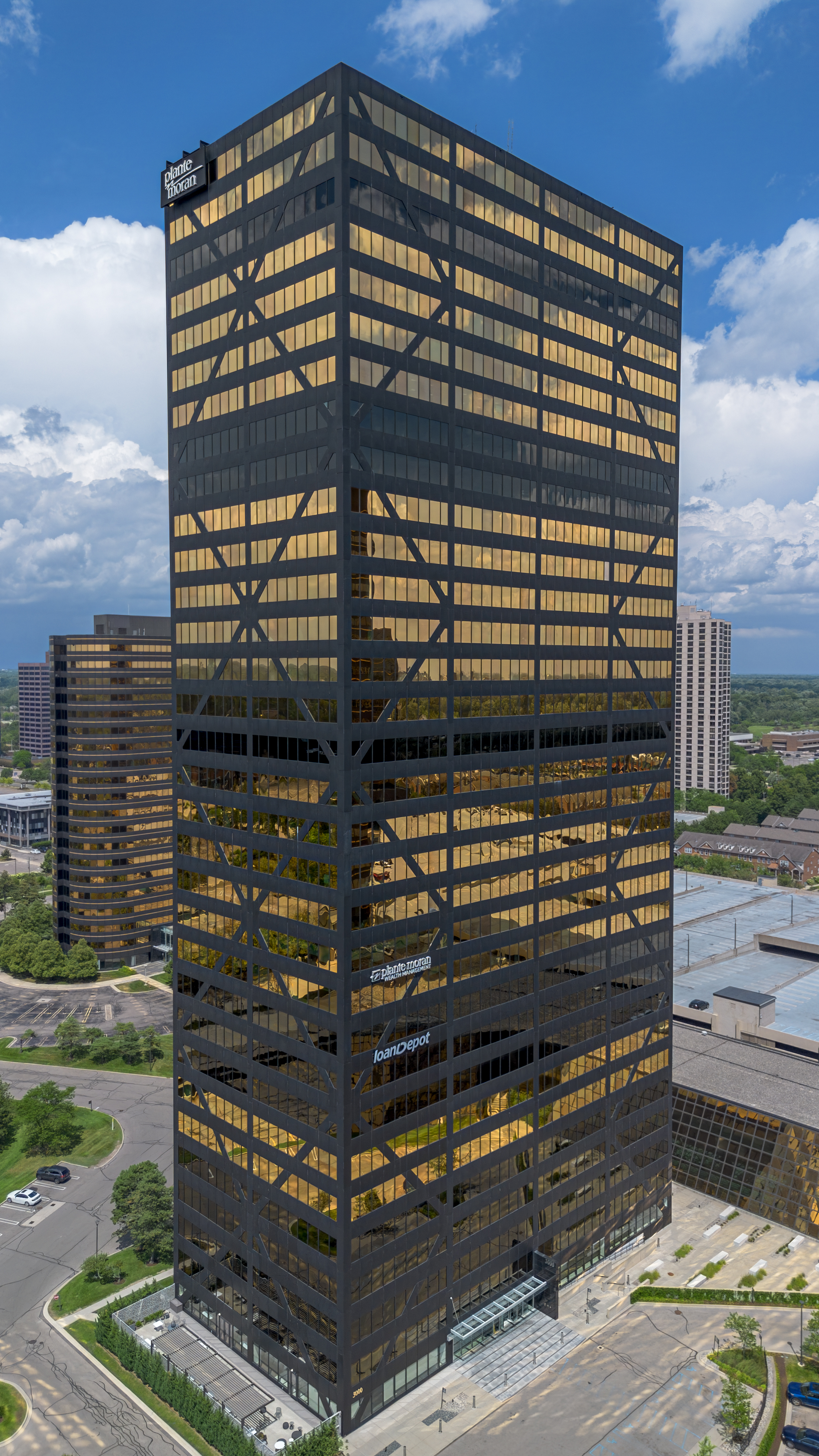
- Headquarters in Southfield, Michigan
- Type: Professional Limited Liability Company
- Industry: Professional Services
- Founded: January 20, 1924
- Founder: Elorion Plante and Frank Moran
- Headquarters: Southfield, MI, USA
- Services: Accounting, Audit, Consulting, Tax, Technology, Wealth Management
- Revenue: $798 million (2020)
- Number of employees: More than 3,000
- Website: www.plantemoran.com

Plante Moran is one of the largest audit, tax, consulting, and wealth management firms in the United States according to Inside Public Accounting's list of the “Top 100” firms. The firm employs more than 3,800 people and has 23 offices in Michigan, Ohio, Illinois, Colorado, Mexico, India, Japan, and China.

The firm is a founding member of Praxity, an international association of independent accounting firms in the major markets of North America, South America, Europe, and Asia. In 2023, Fortune magazine ranked Plante Moran No. 16 on their list of the ”100 Best Companies to Work For” based on an employee satisfaction survey. This was the 25th consecutive year the firm made the list.

== History ==
Plante Moran was founded by Elorion Plante in 1924. Frank Moran was named partner in 1950, and the firm became known as Plante & Moran. The pair had originally met when Moran, a philosophy student, became a geometry tutor for Plante’s daughter. Moran’s philosophy training would lay the foundation for what he called “a people firm disguised as an accounting firm.” In 1955, Moran became managing partner, remaining in the role until stepping down and becoming chairman in 1981.

By the early 1960s, a third of the firm's revenue came from non-accounting services. In 1977, the firm created its first affiliate, Total Personal Financial Planning, now known as Plante Moran Financial Advisors. The firm’s first mergers came in 1986 under the direction of Managing Partner Edward Parks and included expansion into three Michigan cities (Kalamazoo, Battle Creek, Benton Harbor/St. Joseph), as well as Cleveland, Ohio.

Several more additions to service capabilities came in the 1990s under the direction of Bill Matthews, who was named managing partner in 1993. That same year, Plante Moran Financial Advisors registered with the SEC, and just one year later, Plante Moran Cresa (commercial real estate advisors, now Plante Moran Realpoint) was formed. The firm created P&M Corporate Finance, an investment banking group, in 1996, and in 1998, Plante & Moran Benefits Administration LLC (now Plante Moran Group Benefits Advisors) was formed.

In 2001, Bill Hermann was named managing partner. The following year, the firm was chosen to help investigate the Enron collapse, and Plante Moran Trust was formed. Their international expansion began shortly after, with offices opened in Shanghai, China; Monterrey, Mexico; and Mumbai, India by 2010. During that time, the firm also merged with Gleeson, Sklar, Sawyers & Cumpata (GSS&C), adding three Illinois offices.

In 2003, Plante Moran established its Diversity, Equity, and Inclusion (DEI) Council to guide the firm toward long-term success and growth in diversity practices.

In 2009, Gordon Krater became managing partner. During his time as leader, the firm opened an office in Detroit, Mich., and merged with two other firms: Stuart Franey Matthews & Chantres P.C., and Blackman Kallick. Plante & Moran also dropped the ampersand from its name, becoming “Plante Moran,” and won the first-ever Global Workplace Recognition with International Accounting Bulletin's Employer of the Year award. In 2011, Krater and his predecessor, Bill Hermann, coauthored “Succession Transition: A Roadmap for Seamless Transitions in Leadership.” The following year, the firm began its Women in Leadership program to address the issue of attrition among women at the firm before reaching the most senior positions.

In 2017, Jim Proppe assumed the managing partner role. Later that year, the firm opened its fourth international office in Tokyo, Japan, and the following year, the firm expanded its presence into the western United States after merging with Denver-based firm, EKS&H. This brought Plante Moran’s number of staff to over 3,000 — the highest in firm history — and at the time made them the 11th largest accounting firm in the nation.

In November 2023, Jason Drake was elected the firm’s next managing partner, effective July 1, 2024. A former leader of Plante Moran’s international offices and global services practice for six years, Drake was recognized by Crain’s Detroit Business in 2015 as a “40 Under 40” recipient for helping the firm increase international business revenue by 400%.

== Culture ==
Plante Moran's organisational culture draws on the philosophy of co-founder Frank Moran, who described the firm as a "grand experiment" in values-based, people-first management. His "Wheel of Progress" philosophy held that attracting and retaining skilled employees would lead to higher quality client service and sustained organisational success. Moran emphasised work-life balance — referred to as the "life on a tightrope approach" — as a key element of staff retention, alongside what he described as maintaining a "relatively jerk-free culture.

Plante Moran’s DEI Council, staff resource groups, Women in Leadership initiative, and WorkFlex Committee (which promotes work-life balance) are programs through which the firm develops, supports, and invests in staff across its offices. Some of Plante Moran’s most-emphasized values include their “We Care” philosophy and the Golden Rule. Their culture has earned them several awards over the years, including Fortune magazine’s Best Places to Work for Millennials, Best Places to Work for Parents, Best Places to Work for Women, and the 100 Best Companies to Work For, as well as several industry-based and geography-based awards.

== Service model ==
Plante Moran’s service model — unique in the accounting industry — appeals to collective, client-first service and the specialized expertise of its staff over localized or office-level profit centers. Referred to as a “one-firm” firm model (a term borrowed from former Harvard Business School Professor David Maister), this method provides clients access to relevant industry technical experts and accounting staff based on need, regardless of location.

== Services ==
Services provided by Plante Moran and its affiliates include the following:

Audit

- Employee benefit plan audit
- Financial statement audit
- International audit
- SEC surprise audit
- Single audit

Tax

- International tax
- Mergers & acquisitions
- Personal tax
- State & local tax
- Tax controversy services
- Tax credits, incentives, & inductions
- Transfer pricing

Consulting

- Commercial real estate advisory
- Cost & margin intelligence
- Cybersecurity
- Data analytics
- Employee benefits consulting
- ERP consulting
- Finance & accounting solutions
- Forensic accounting
- Group benefits & brokerage services
- International services
- Investment banking
- Real estate investment advisory
- Restructuring & transformation
- Risk management
- Senior living development consulting
- Strategy
- Supply chain & operations consulting
- Talent and Organizational Development
- Technology consulting
- Transaction advisory services
- Valuation services

Wealth Management

- Business transition services
- Estate planning
- Family legacy
- Family office services
- Financial planning
- Insurance
- Investment advisory
- Personal tax planning
- Trust

== Industries served ==
- Construction
- Dealerships
- Education
- Energy
- Financial services
- Food & beverage
- Franchise
- Government
- Healthcare
- Insurance services
- Life sciences & medical device
- Manufacturing & distribution
- Not-for-profit
- Private equity
- Professional services
- Real estate
- Restaurants
- Retail
- Technology companies

== Affiliated services ==
- P&M Corporate Finance (PMCF)
- Plante Moran Realpoint, formerly Plante Moran Cresa
- Plante Moran Financial Advisors
- Plante Moran Group Benefit Advisors
- Plante Moran Insurance Agency
- Plante Moran Living Forward
- Plante Moran Realpoint Investment Advisors (PMRIA), formerly Plante Moran Real Estate Investment Advisors (REIA)
- Plante Moran Trust
