= John Thomas Springer =

American politician

John Thomas Springer (January 31, 1831 – October 8. 1909) was an American lawyer and politician.

Springer was born in Sullivan County, Indiana. He lived with his family in Jacksonville, Illinois. Springer went to Illinois College and then moved to California where he was involved with the mining industry. Springer moved back to Jacksonville, Illinois. He studied law and was admitted to the Illinois bar in 1858. He practiced law in Jacksonville, Illinois and was also involved with the banking business.

A War Democrat, he supported Abraham Lincoln. Springer served in the Illinois House of Representatives from 1864 to 1868 and was a Democrat. Springer died in Jacksonville, Illinois. His son was John W. Springer who also served in the Illinois General Assembly.
