= John W. Springer =

American politician

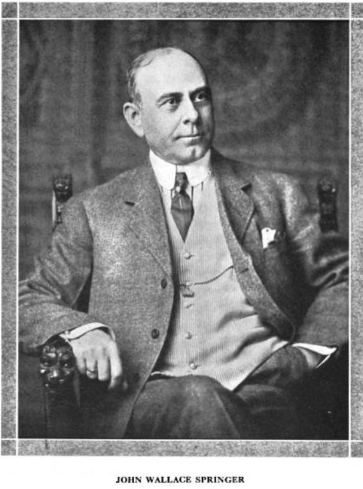

John W. Springer (July 16, 1859 – January 10, 1945) was an attorney and banker in the states of Illinois, Texas, and Colorado.

Earlier he was a clerk during the 50th United States Congress (1887–1889) and represented his district in the state legislature of the General Assembly of Illinois at the state capital of Springfield.

He later was active in business, politics, and society in Denver, Colorado. Springer had a 10,000 acre ranch and farm, which included the Highlands Ranch Mansion. The ranch became the suburb of Highlands Ranch, Colorado. His second wife, Isabel Patterson Springer, was the center of a scandal that resulted in the murder of two men at the famous Brown Palace Hotel in Denver.

== Early life and education ==
John Wallace Springer, born in Jacksonville, Illinois, on July 16, 1859, was the son of Sarah Henderson and John Thomas Springer (1831–1909), who was a banker and an attorney. His father John Thomas was a War Democrat in political views during the American Civil War (1861–1865) era and a member of the Illinois General Assembly (state legislature) in the state capital of Springfield. His father although a Democrat who supported Republican Party and Unionist supporter of local lawyer and future 16th President Abraham Lincoln (1809–1865, served 1861–1865), especially during his candidacy for the presidency in the pivotal / crucial 1860 United States presidential election.

John's mother Sarah Henderson Springer was from one of the distinguished families further south in Kentucky. His uncle William McKendree Springer (1836–1903), was also from Jacksonville, attended and graduated from Illinois College and served as an Illinois General Assembly state legislator and subsequent federal judge in the national federal capital city of Washington, D.C., serving on the United States Court of Appeals.

He was raised in Jacksonville in Morgan County, of Illinois.

He attended the local public schools and the Whipple Academy. He later attended the nearby Illinois College in Jacksonville for one year before enrolling at old Asbury College next-door further to the east in Indiana (now DePauw University). He graduated in 1878 with a Bachelor of Arts academic degree. He was a member of Phi Kappa Psi fraternity Society. At Asbury, he was trained in declamation, public speaking and debate. He provided an address to his graduating class at Asbury College on statesmanship. He took a trip overseas and toured aboard following his graduation. He then studied the law and was admitted to the bar to practice law in Illinois in 1880.

== Career ==
He opened the law firm Springer & Dummer and practiced law in Jacksonville, Illinois for almost a decade. During the 50th United States Congress (1887–1889), he represented his district as a clerk of the United States House of Representatives Committee on Territories in the national federal capital of Washington, D.C. In 1891, he was elected to represent his district in the lower chamber of the Illinois House of Representatives in the General Assembly of Illinois (state legislature) at the Illinois State Capitol in Springfield. He later also practiced law and became involved in the banking and finance arena in Dallas, Texas.

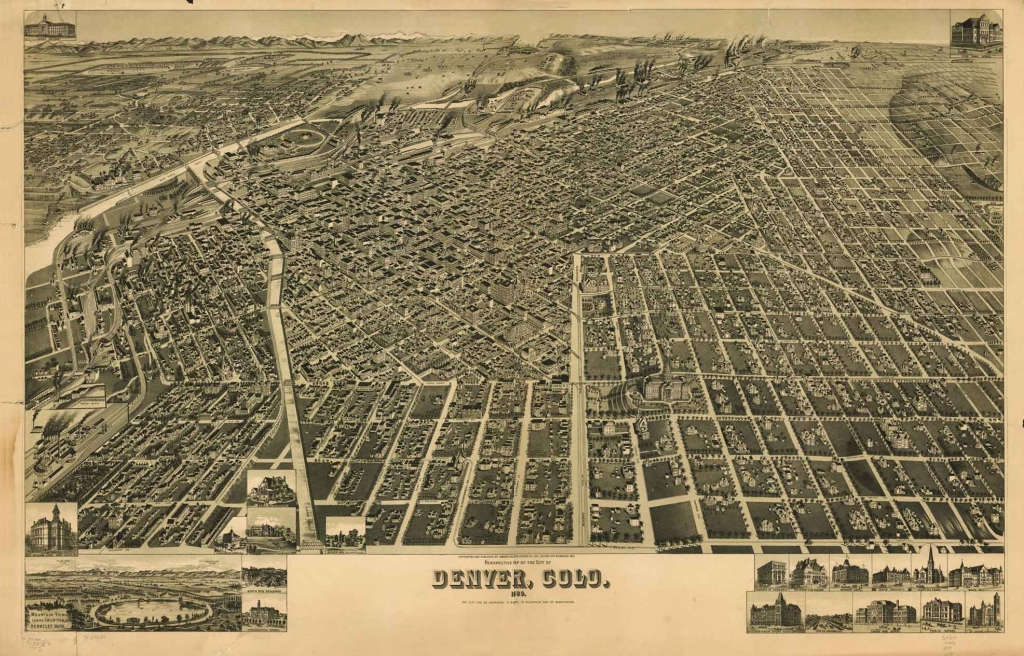
Denver, Colorado in 1889

He moved to Denver, Colorado in 1896. Due to the silver issue and its progressive Democratic candidate William Jennings Bryan (1860–1925), of Omaha, Nebraska. Springer then left the Democratic Party and was active there in the opposing Republican Party and future 25th President William McKinley (1843–1901, served 1897–1901), of Canton, Ohio and his presidential candidate "front porch" subdued campaign style in the 1896 presidential and congressional elections, which involved travel throughout the state. He was involved in social, business, and political activities locally and across the state. He was an owner of Capital National Bank and in 1902 he was the company's president. He purchased the Continental building at Lawrence and 16th Street, and established the Continental Trust Company in 1902 with his father-in-law Colonel William E. Hughes. He then became the trust company's vice president. In 1909, the banking company was reorganized and he was made president of the Continental Trust Company. He was also treasurer and secretary of the subsidiary Continental Land and Title Company.

He ran for the office of Mayor of Denver against Robert W. Speer (1855–1918), three-termed incumbent in 1904, but was defeated in a nationally known controversial election marked by accusations of fraud. It was claimed that there was fraud and malpractice in the counting of the ballots and is considered one of the most corrupt municipal elections in Denver's history. He was later endorsed that same year as a vice-presidential candidate at the Colorado state Republican Party convention in 1904. (Note: The Washington Post daily newspaper in the national capital city of Washington, reported that if the ballots were counted correctly, he would have won by 13,000 votes, according to his friends.) He was also a candidate for the United States Senate seat from Colorado two years later in 1906 (in the era before 1913 when U.S. Senators were elected by the members of state legislatures).

He became involved with the Denver Chamber of Commerce, where he served as the vice-president and a director. He was the member of a number of civic, political, and professional organizations in the city of Denver and was known for his skills as a public speaker.

== Colorado Ranch ==
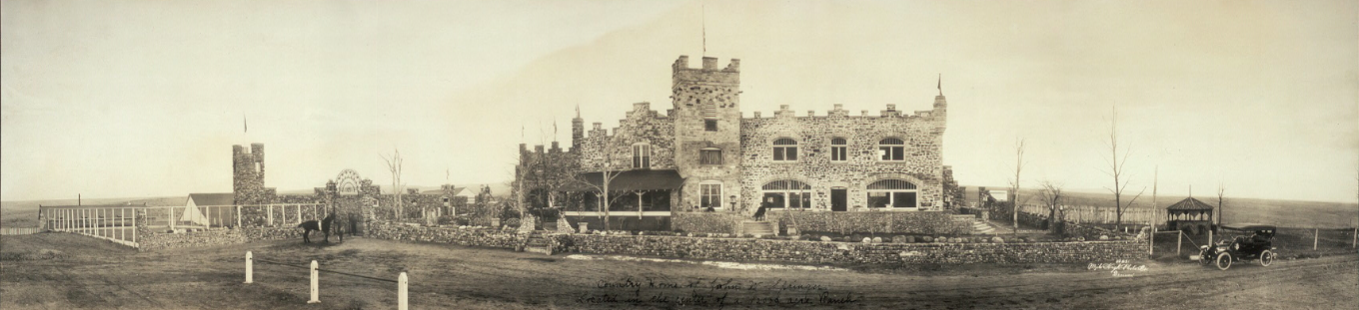
Highlands Ranch Mansion at Springer Cross Country Horse and Cattle Ranch, ca. 1910

He purchased 10,000 acres overlooking the city of Denver to create a farm and a ranch, including his Highlands Ranch Mansion, called the Springer Cross Country Horse and Cattle Ranch in 1898. He became the area's largest land-owner. He bought the property through a series of purchases while he was married to his first wife, Eliza Hughes Springer. The ranch grew to 12,000 acres and Springer pursued his interest in show horses, raising rare German Oldenburg coach stallions. After his first wife Eliza had died and his second wife was involved in a murder scandal, he sold the Colorado ranch to Eliza's father, Colonel William E. Hughes in 1913. The ranch ultimately became redeveloped by the Hughes family interests and was built over as the Denver suburb town of Highlands Ranch, Colorado.

From 1898 to 1905, he was president of the National Livestock Association.. He was also president of the Colorado Cattle and Horse Growers Association beginning in 1907. He supported efforts for irrigation and the sugar beet farming industries. He lobbied for various legislation of interest pertaining to agriculture and ranching to the agencies and personnel of the federal government through the National Livestock Association in Washington, D.C.

== Personal life ==
=== First wife – Eliza Clifton Hughes ===
On June 17, 1891, he married Eliza Clifton Hughes, whose father was Colonel William E. Hughes of Dallas, Texas. Springer handled business matters for his father-in-law's ranch and cattle business. Eliza and John had two daughters, Annie Clifton and Sarah Elizabeth, but Sarah died before her first birthday. Annie was born in Dallas on December 22, 1892. The Springers and Eliza's parents, Annie and Colonel William Hughes, moved to Denver in 1896. Eliza had tuberculosis and they moved to Colorado for her health, and Annie often lived with her grandparents. Springer bought a house at 1801 Williams Street, Denver in 1896. (Note: He sold the house on Williams Street in 1900 to Emily Cannon. Two years later, he bought it back and lived in it until 1904.) Eliza died on May 22, 1904. Annie lived most of the time with her grandparents, due to her father's "busy, on-the-go" lifestyle. She inherited her mother's fortune in 1907. (Note: John Springer transferred legal guardianship of Annie to her grandparents in 1907. She lived with them in St. Louis. In 1912, she married Lafayette Hughes, the son of Charles J. Hughes, a Colorado senator in Denver. Lafayette was of no relation to her. Annie and Lafayette lived in Denver, and her grandparents moved to Denver to be close to her. They built houses for themselves and for Annie and Lafayette. Her grandfather died in 1918 and she inherited the family ranch in what is now Highlands Ranch and kept it for just two years before she sold it.)

=== Second wife – Isabel Patterson Folck ===
Springer met Isabel Patterson Folck in Denver when she was on a trip. During the summer of 1906, he had a relationship with the married woman, who was described as "a beautiful, audacious young woman who developed an addiction to nightlife, narcotics, and adventure." Isabel was twenty years Springer's junior. She returned to her home in St. Louis to obtain a divorce from a traveling salesman, John E. Folck. Springer and Isabel were married in St. Louis, Missouri in April 1907, three days after she received her divorce. After they were married and had a wedding luncheon, they boarded a train for Denver. They lived at Springer's house in Denver and at the ranch.

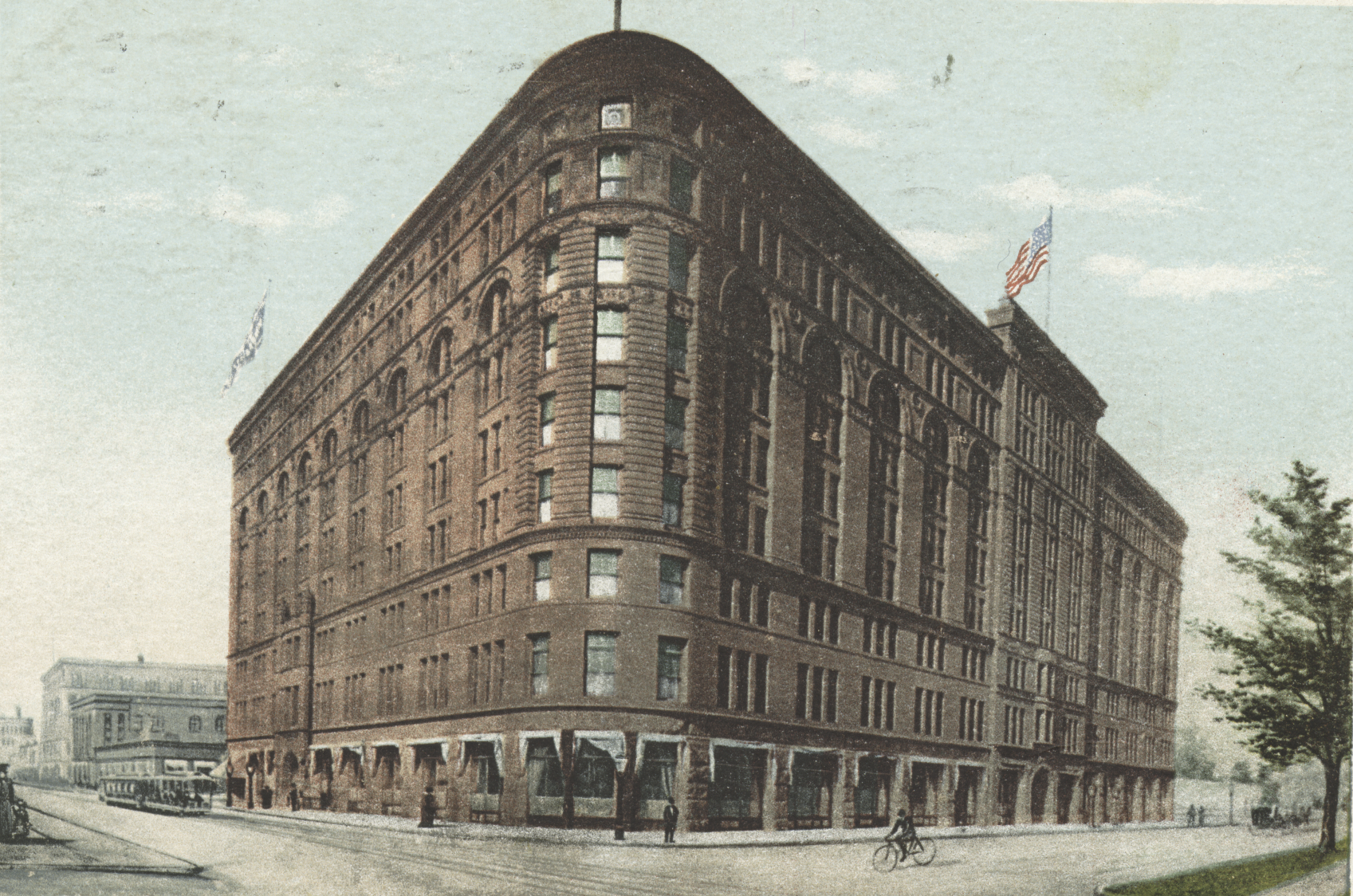
The Brown Palace Hotel, in downtown Denver, Colorado, ca. 1901, (New York Public Library)

When Isabel missed the nightlife, Springer rented a suite at the Brown Palace Hotel so that she could stay there after evenings out with her friends. Having heard rumors about Isabel's promiscuity, Colonel Hughes was able to gain custody of his granddaughter Annie from Springer. Hughes had checked out her reputation. After he received guardianship, Annie and her grandparents moved to St. Louis. Hughes also sold off every investment that he had that was associated with Springer, which had a significant negative impact on Springer's wealth and future income. (Note: After the murders of 1911 and associated scandal, Springer began to sell off portions of his ranch and withdrew from social life.)

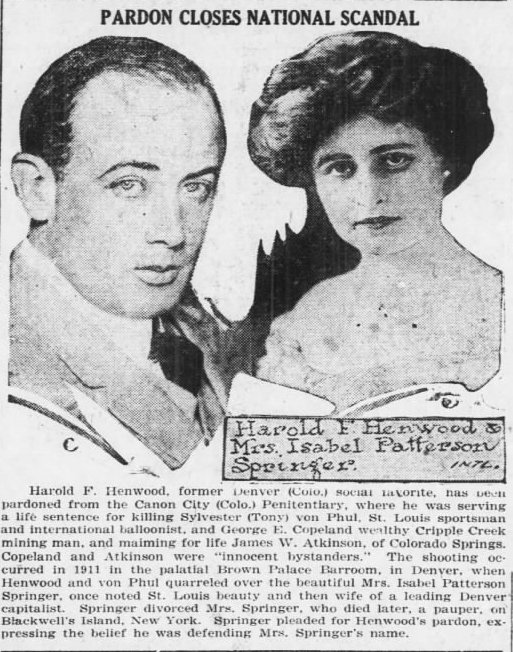
Murders at Brown Palace Hotel, Denver, 1911

Isabel traveled with Springer on business trips, but did not always come back with him. She sometimes visited friends in St. Louis. She had a relationship with Tony von Phul of St. Louis before her marriage that continued after her marriage. She wrote him intimate letters beginning in January 1911 and asked for him to visit her in Denver. Two months later, she became close with one of her husband's business partners, Harold Francis Henwood. They sometimes stayed by themselves at the family's ranch when Springer was out of town. On May 12, she asked for Henwood to retrieve letters that she had written to von Phul. Then on May 20, she wrote another letter to von Phul, who took a train to Denver on May 23. On that day, Henwood visited Isabel at the Springer's suite in the Brown Palace Hotel and she expressed her desire to end the relationship with von Phul, who threatened to share her letters with her husband if the affair was ended. On the night of May 24, Henwood shot and killed von Phul, and accidentally killed an innocent bystander, George Copeland, in the hotel's Marble Bar. The murders culminated in a very public trial. (Note: Henwood, who maintained that he killed Phul to save Springer's marriage, was found guilty and was imprisoned. Springer convinced the governor to pardon him in 1922. Henwood was jailed again when he threatened to kill a woman who refused to marry him. He died in prison in 1929 in Canon City.)

Springer filed for divorce the day after the murders and was divorced on July 1, 1911, in Denver, Colorado. (Note: They are also said to have been divorced five days or five weeks after the murder.) A condition of the divorce was that Isabel would forever leave Denver. She left on an eastbound train right after the completion of the murder trial. Isabel died in Chicago in a charity ward in 1917.

=== Third wife – Janette Elizabeth Muir ===
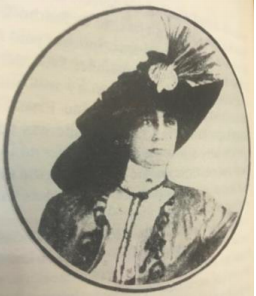
Janette Muir Springer, third wife of John Wallace Springer, 1915

On August 26, 1915, he married a 27-year-old woman, Janette Elizabeth Orr Muir Lotave. He was a friend of her family. She was born in 1888 in Scotland in the northern portion of the island of Great Britain in the United Kingdom, in Europe, and came across the Atlantic Ocean to the United States in 1890 at age 2 years old with her family. She first married Carl Lotave, an artist, when she was 17 or 18 years of age, around 1905 or 1906, and divorced him about three years in 1909. She became a naturalized American citizen a year after her second marriage to John Wallace Springer.

The Springers lived on Sloan Lake at 1655 Vrain Street and called the house Springer Lodge. In 1926, Janette bought a house at 2900 South University Boulevard called Wellshire Park Cottage for cost of the construction loan. Janette and John Springer lived there in 1927 for about a year and until March 1928, when the house was foreclosed. They lived together at several multiple residences over the course of their marriage, including a cottage at 888 York Street and in Littleton, Colorado.

== Death ==
He died in a local hospital at age 85 years old on January 10, 1945, and was buried at the Littleton Cemetery in Littleton, Colorado. His third wife, Janette Elizabeth Muir Springer, is buried next to him. She died 12 years after him on October 3, 1957, also in Littleton, Colorado.
