= Highlands Ranch, Colorado =

Unincorporated community in Colorado, US

- Unincorporated community Census-designated place
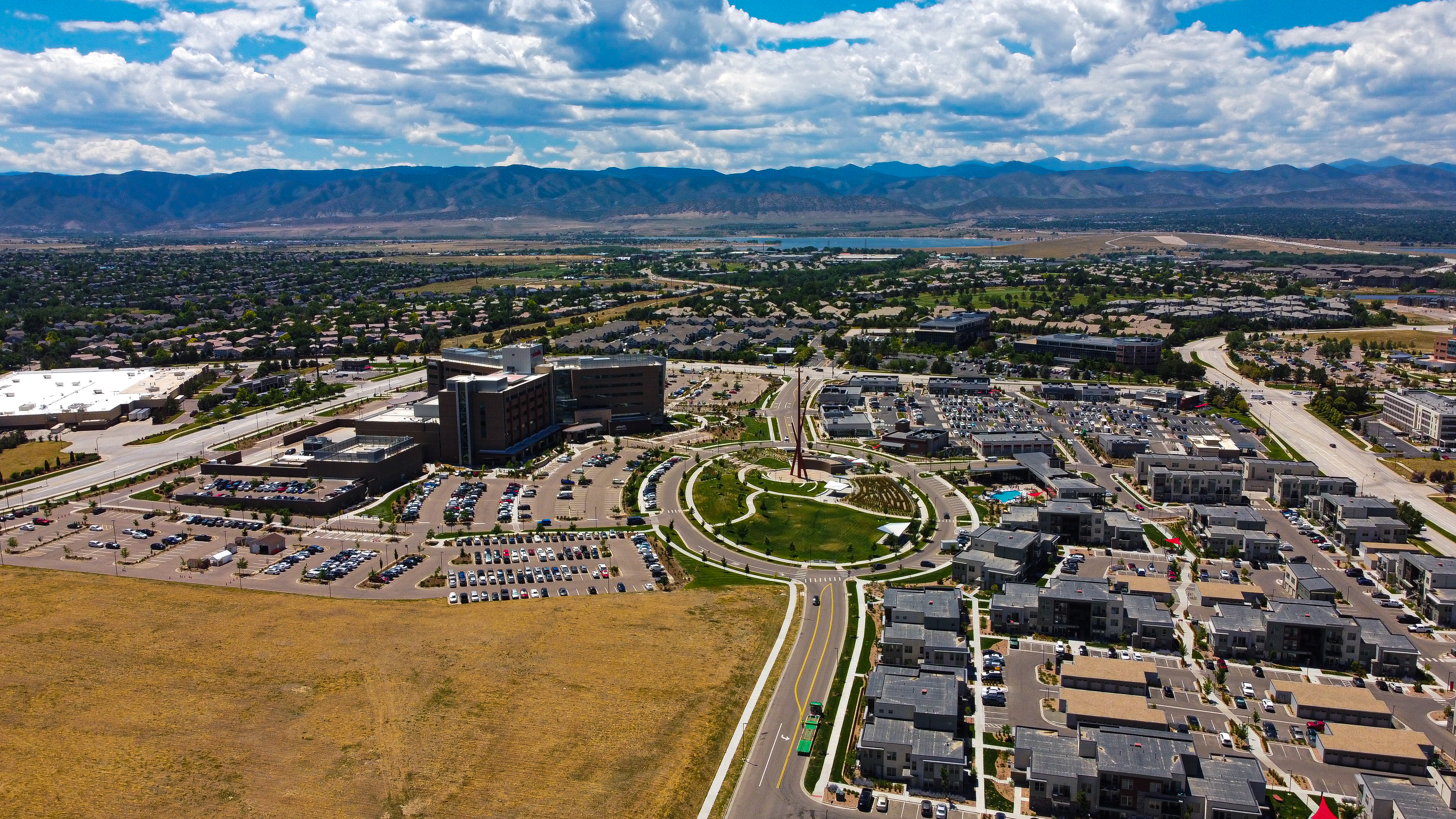
- Highlands Ranch, Colorado.

- Location of the Highlands Ranch CDP in Douglas County, Colorado
- Coordinates: 39°32′38″N 104°59′16″W
- Country: United States
- State: Colorado
- County: Douglas County

Government
  - Type: Unincorporated community

Area
  - Total: 24.294 sq mi (62.920 km^{2})
  - Land: 24.268 sq mi (62.855 km^{2})
  - Water: 0.025 sq mi (0.065 km^{2})
- Elevation: 5,817 ft (1,773 m)

Population (2020)
  - Total: 105,631
  - Density: 3,990/sq mi (1,539/km^{2})
- Time zone: UTC-7 (MST)
  - Summer (DST): UTC-6 (MDT)
- ZIP Code: 80126, 80129, 80130 and 80163
- Area codes: Area codes 303 and 720
- GNIS feature ID: 2408386

Highlands Ranch is an unincorporated community in and governed by Douglas County, Colorado, United States. For statistical purposes, the United States Census Bureau has defined the community as a census-designated place (CDP) as a part of the Denver–Aurora–Lakewood, CO Metropolitan Statistical Area. The population of the Highlands Ranch CDP was 105,631 at the 2020 census, making it the largest community in Douglas County and the most populous unincorporated community in Colorado. The Highlands Ranch Metropolitan District provides services to the community, which lies in ZIP Codes 80126, 80129, 80130, and 80163 (for post office boxes).

== History ==
=== Beginnings ===
This area of the Colorado Front Range was populated by a number of nomadic tribes, including the Ute, Cheyenne and Arapaho tribes. Because it was part of the Mississippi River Drainage Area, it was claimed by France by French explorer René-Robert Cavelier, Sieur de La Salle and it was named as part of "Louisiana" in 1682. The Spanish gained Louisiana in 1763, and returned it to France in 1801. This area of what is now Northern Douglas County, was in the Louisiana Purchase when it was sold to the United States in 1803.

The Stephen H. Long's Expedition of 1820 entered the area at the beginning of July 1820. That was the first documented exploration of the area by European or United States explorers.

Much of the Denver Metro Area began to be settled as ranch land starting in 1859, but because of a lack of water in the area, it was not permanently settled until around 1870. The first legal settler of the area was Curtis H. Field, who purchased land just on the west side of Santa Fe Drive from the U.S. government on February 25, 1870.

The Highlands Ranch Mansion (or "Castle Isabel") was built over a period of several years, from 1891 to 1904. The first owner of the house was Samuel Allan Long, who purchased a 40-acre homestead in northern Douglas County in 1884 and later expanded it to a 2,000-acre farm. By 1891 he had built a modest farmhouse on the property and called it Rotherwood after a boyhood farm. The name "Rotherwood", a reference to a boyhood farm of Long's, was found etched above the original front door that led experts to believe so. Long was a prominent innovator of dry land farming techniques in Colorado during the late 19th century.

John W. Springer bought the ranch in 1898 and built the Highlands Ranch Mansion. He built it up to a 10,000 acre ranch and farm. It was called "Castle Isabel" for a time for his second wife Isabel Patterson Springer. He began selling off parts of the ranch in 1911. The mansion underwent a renovation from 2010 to 2012 that was funded by Shea Homes.

=== 20th century ===
The Colorado Gold Rush brought people to Colorado in droves during the late 19th and early 20th centuries. The city of Denver, located approximately 12 miles to the north, grew considerably during this time. However, the area remained a series of farms and ranches, and many residents would visit the town of Littleton, a few miles northward, when they needed to purchase clothing, supplies, or other items.

The Springer land was bought and sold several times throughout the 1920s and 1930s. In 1937 it was bought by Lawrence C. Phipps, Jr., who used it to raise cattle and hunt fox. After Phipps died in 1976, the land was bought by Marvin Davis, the owner of an oil company.

=== Becoming a suburb ===
In 1978, a large parcel of land in unincorporated Douglas County was purchased by The Mission Viejo Company. As the suburbs of Denver expanded, the company desired to build a new planned suburb, called Highlands Ranch, in northern Douglas County, akin to its first planned development of Mission Viejo, California. Initial plans were drawn up, many of which are still being realized. These plans laid out several major streets and called for several schools and recreation centers, as well as a town center and public library. Large parcels of land were sold to private housing developers, such as Richmond Homes. As these developments appeared, they often carried their own names, creating a series of segmented neighborhoods throughout Highlands Ranch. Plans for Highlands Ranch also included a snaking "green belt" which provided for undeveloped land for recreation. The plans also allowed for a large number of public parks and bike paths.

The first homes in Highlands Ranch were built in 1981, near South Broadway. Simultaneously, the state built a new freeway through the area, C-470, which opened in 1985 and was expanded to include express lanes in 2020. Many of the first residents of Highlands Ranch complained about the initial lack of commercial development. Residents had to drive many miles (usually into Littleton) for groceries, entertainment, or medical care. The first public school, Northridge Elementary, opened in 1982. The same year also saw the completion of the Northridge Recreation Center, an athletic club available to all Highlands Ranch homeowners. The first secondary school, Highlands Ranch Jr/Sr High School, opened in 1987. This institution became solely a high school, named Highlands Ranch High School, in 1991 with the building of nearby Cresthill Middle School. The first Highlands Ranch branch of Douglas County Libraries also opened in 1991, housed in a strip mall off Broadway and Springer Drive.

=== Recent history ===
Over the next 25 years, the population of Highlands Ranch increasingly expanded. Highlands Ranch celebrated its 10th anniversary in 1991 with a population of 17,000 residents. Over the next ten years, Highlands Ranch continued to develop on a large scale, and as of the 2020 census has 103,444 residents.

In 1997, The Mission Viejo Company was acquired by Shea Properties, which continued to expand the community. This included bringing a regional office of Lucent Technologies, and later in the same complex Avaya Communication, to the area. The year 2000 saw the opening of a much larger Highlands Ranch Library as well as the establishment of the Highlands Ranch Chamber of Commerce.

On December 31, 2017, a gunman opened fire at the Copper Canyon Apartment Homes, killing a police deputy, and wounded six others, including two civilians. The perpetrator was later killed by the SWAT tactical team in a shootout.

On May 7, 2019, two students opened fire at the STEM School Highlands Ranch, killing a student and injuring eight others. A senior at the time, Kendrick Castillo tackled the gunman and lost his life protecting his classmates. Following the act of heroism, Lucent Boulevard was renamed Kendrick Castillo Way, a memorial was erected in Civic Green Park, and a scholarship fund was established in his honor. The school is located near Columbine High School, where a mass shooting occurred in April 1999. Both perpetrators were taken into custody in the aftermath of the shooting.

On June 22, 2023, a severe thunderstorm produced a high end EF-1 tornado around 3:30 pm. The tornado touched down near Colorado State Highway 470 and tracked 8.36 miles through Highlands Ranch and into Lone Tree. The tornado caused extensive tree, roof and fence damage, but no injuries were reported.

== Geography ==
Located on Colorado State Highway 470 in central Colorado, Highlands Ranch is 13 miles (21 km) south of downtown Denver and 13 miles (21 km) north-northwest of Castle Rock, the county seat.

As a suburb of Denver, Highlands Ranch is part of both the greater Denver metropolitan area and the Front Range Urban Corridor. It borders several other Denver suburbs including Littleton and Centennial to the north and Acres Green and Lone Tree to the east. In addition, Highlands Ranch borders Chatfield State Park to the west. As Highlands Ranch is a CDP, its boundaries are defined by the U.S. Census Bureau and have no legal standing.

The Highlands Ranch CDP has an area of 15,548 acres (62.920 km^{2}), including 16 acres (0.065 km^{2}) of water.

=== Climate ===
Climate data for Highlands Ranch, Colorado
Month	Jan	Feb	Mar	Apr	May	Jun	Jul	Aug	Sep	Oct	Nov	Dec	Year
Average precipitation inches	0.62	0.80	1.47	2.23	2.33	1.96	2.08	2.22	1.44	1.36	0.91	0.62	18.04
Average precipitation mm	16	20	37	57	59	50	53	56	37	35	23	16	459
Source: NOAA

== Demographics ==
The United States Census Bureau initially defined the Highlands Ranch CDP for the 1990 United States census.

Highlands Ranch CDP, Colorado
Year	Pop.	±%
1990	10,181	—
2000	70,931	+596.7%
2010	96,713	+36.3%
2020	105,631	+9.2%
Source: United States Census Bureau

=== 2020 census ===
As of the 2020 census, Highlands Ranch had a population of 103,444. The median age was 40.3 years. 26.3% of residents were under the age of 18 and 13.1% of residents were 65 years of age or older. For every 100 females there were 96.1 males, and for every 100 females age 18 and over there were 93.4 males age 18 and over.

100.0% of residents lived in urban areas, while 0.0% lived in rural areas.

There were 37,411 households in Highlands Ranch, of which 39.2% had children under the age of 18 living in them. Of all households, 64.6% were married-couple households, 11.9% were households with a male householder and no spouse or partner present, and 19.4% were households with a female householder and no spouse or partner present. About 19.2% of all households were made up of individuals and 8.5% had someone living alone who was 65 years of age or older.

There were 38,603 housing units, of which 3.1% were vacant. The homeowner vacancy rate was 0.7% and the rental vacancy rate was 6.7%.

Racial composition as of the 2020 census
Race	Number	Percent
White	82,793	80.0%
Black or African American	1,198	1.2%
American Indian and Alaska Native	425	0.4%
Asian	7,404	7.2%
Native Hawaiian and Other Pacific Islander	73	0.1%
Some other race	1,912	1.8%
Two or more races	9,639	9.3%
Hispanic or Latino (of any race)	9,044	8.7%

=== 2010 census ===
As of the 2010 census, there were 96,713 people, 34,054 households, and 26,535 families residing in the CDP. The population density was 3,986.5 inhabitants per square mile (1,539.2/km^{2}). There were 35,167 housing units at an average density of 1,449.6 units per square mile (559.7 units/km^{2}). The racial makeup of the CDP was 88.7% White, 5.6% Asian, 1.2% African American, 0.4% American Indian, 0.0% Pacific Islander, 1.4% from other races, and 2.6% from two or more races. Hispanics and Latinos of any race were 7.2% of the population.

There were 34,054 households, out of which 48.0% had children under the age of 18 living with them, 67.5% were married couples living together, 3.1% had a male householder with no wife present, 7.3% had a female householder with no husband present, and 22.1% were non-families. 18.2% of all households were made up of individuals, and 4.3% had someone living alone who was 65 years of age or older. The average household size was 2.84, and the average family size was 3.27.

The distribution of the population by age was 32.0% under the age of 18, 5.0% from 18 to 24, 30.3% from 25 to 44, 26.1% from 45 to 64, and 6.6% who were 65 years of age or older. The median age was 36.3 years. The gender makeup of the CDP was 49.1% male and 50.9% female.

The median income for a household in the CDP was $104,411, and the median income for a family was $113,944. Males had a median income of $84,067 versus $54,962 for females. The CDP's per capita income was $43,137. About 1.1% of families and 1.6% of the population were below the poverty line, including 1.4% of those under age 18 and 1.8% of those age 65 or over.

== Economy ==
As of 2013, 74.9% of the population over the age of 16 was in the labor force. 0.1% was in the armed forces, and 74.8% was in the civilian labor force with 71.1% employed and 3.7% unemployed. The occupational composition of the employed civilian labor force was: 58.2% in management, business, science, and arts; 26.4% in sales and office occupations; 8.6% in service occupations; 3.7% in production, transportation, and material moving; 3.2% in natural resources, construction, and maintenance. The three industries employing the largest percentages of the working civilian labor force were: educational services, health care, and social assistance (20.5%); professional, scientific, and management, and administrative and waste management services (16.1%); finance and insurance, and real estate and rental and leasing (12.2%).

The cost of living in Highlands Ranch is above average; compared to a U.S. average of 100, the cost of living index for the community is 107.4. As of 2013, the median home value in the CDP was $335,900, the median selected monthly owner cost was $2,070 for housing units with a mortgage and $533 for those without, and the median gross rent was $1,504.

Notable companies headquartered in Highlands Ranch include UDR, Inc. and Peterson's. Visa Inc.'s Operations Center Central is based in Highlands Ranch.

== Government ==
Highlands Ranch is an unincorporated community within Douglas County. Most municipal services, such as the construction and upkeep of arterial roads, parks and open space areas, are performed by the Highlands Ranch Metro District, a special district under state law, which is funded mostly by property taxes and state lottery funds. Highlands Ranch is policed by Douglas County Sheriffs Office, with South Metro Fire Rescue providing fire protection, and all public schools are part of the Douglas County School System.

In addition, all Highlands Ranch residents are asked to sign and follow a community covenant as dictated by the Highlands Ranch Community Association or "HRCA". This covenant places firm guidelines on such issues as housing decoration, fencing, and contribution to the area's library and recreation centers. The Highlands Ranch Community Association obtains its funding through common homeowner association fees and covenant violation fines and, for this reason, is not usually recognized as a government, but rather as a local non-profit organization.

Highlands Ranch lies within Colorado's 4th U.S. Congressional District. For the purposes of representation in the Colorado General Assembly, the CDP is located in the 30th district of the Colorado Senate and the 39th and 43rd districts of the Colorado House of Representatives.

ZIP codes 80126, 80129, 80130, and 80163 – assigned by default to the adjacent City of Littleton – serve Highlands Ranch.

Additionally, Highlands Ranch is partially governed by the Highlands Ranch Metro District, which manages local open spaces, parks, maintenance of major roads, water, storm drains, a senior center, and some fences, along with other services.

== Education ==
Highlands Ranch is served by the Douglas County School District.

=== High schools ===
- Highlands Ranch High School
- Mountain Vista High School
- Rock Canyon High School
- SkyView Academy
- STEM School Highlands Ranch
- ThunderRidge High School
- Valor Christian High School (Private)

=== Middle schools ===
- Ben Franklin Academy (Charter)
- Cherry Hills Christian Middle School (Private)
- Cresthill Middle School
- Mountain Ridge Middle School
- Platte River Academy (Charter)
- Ranch View Middle School
- STEM School Highlands Ranch
- Skyview Academy
- Rocky Heights Middle School

=== Elementary schools ===
- Arma Dei Academy (Private)
- Arrowwood Elementary
- Acres Green Elementary
- Bear Canyon Elementary
- Ben Franklin Academy (Charter)
- Buffalo Ridge Elementary School
- Cherry Hills Christian School (Private)
- Copper Mesa Elementary
- Cougar Run Elementary
- Coyote Creek Elementary
- Eagle Ridge Elementary
- Eldorado Elementary
- Fox Creek Elementary
- Heritage Elementary
- Mile High Academy
- Northridge Elementary
- North Star Academy Charter School (Charter)
- Platte River Academy (Charter)
- Redstone Elementary
- Saddle Ranch Elementary
- Sand Creek Elementary
- Summit View Elementary
- STEM School Highlands Ranch
- Stone Mountain Elementary
- Timber Trail Elementary
- Trailblazer Elementary
- Wildcat Mountain Elementary
- Sky Ridge Academy
- Skyview Academy (Charter)

== Notable people ==
Notable individuals who were born in or have lived in Highlands Ranch include actress Keri Russell, physicist William C. Davidon, NFL All Pro Running Back Christian McCaffrey, U.S. Olympic luger Courtney Zablocki, Czech-American hockey player Milan Hejduk, and Ethan Horvath, goalkeeper for the United States National Soccer Team and Cardiff City F.C., Gavin Sawchuk, Running Back for the University of Oklahoma, and Jacob Lissek, professional and international goalkeeper.

== See also ==
- Denver-Aurora-Boulder, CO Combined Statistical Area
- Denver-Aurora-Broomfield, CO Metropolitan Statistical Area
