= UDC Homes =

American homebuilder

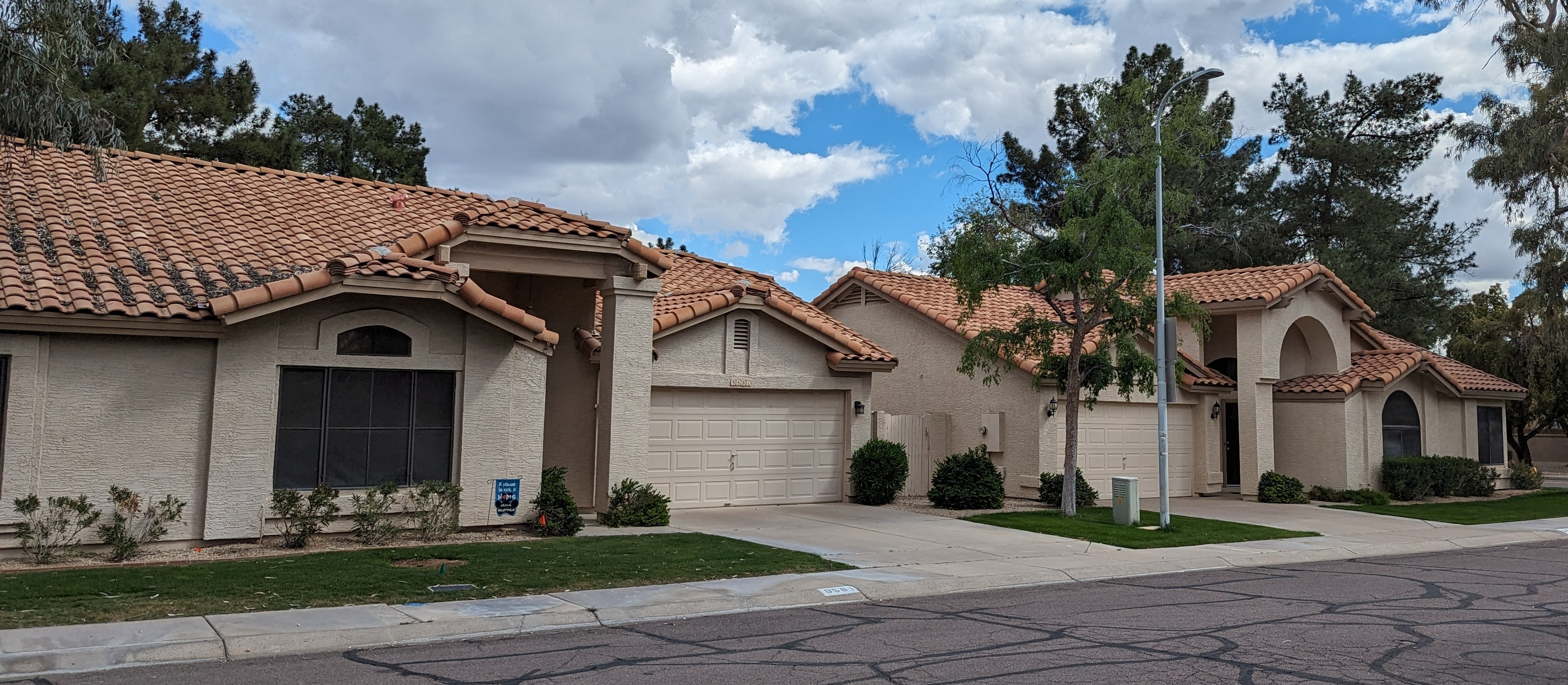
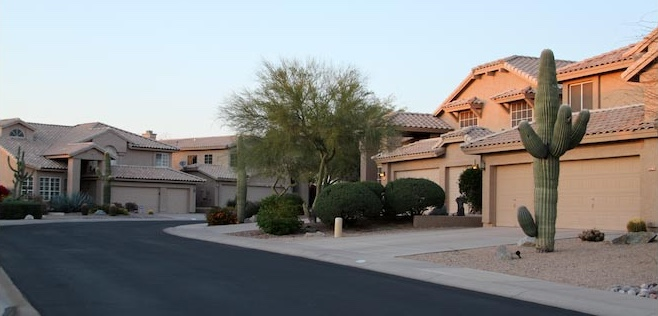
Homes built by UDC Homes in Warner Ranch, Tempe, Arizona (above) and Ironwood Village, Scottsdale, Arizona

UDC Homes was an American homebuilder that operated from 1968 to 1998. The company, founded as the Universal Development Company in Chicago in 1968, became an active homebuilder in the Southwest and Southeast. The firm changed its name to UDC Homes in 1986; the next year, it completed a move of its corporate headquarters to Tempe, Arizona, a suburb of Phoenix. UDC was a highly productive builder, the ninth-largest in the U.S. by 1992; it was the second-largest in Phoenix, a market that represented most of its revenues, and the third-largest in Charlotte, North Carolina. Its homes largely targeted the "move-up" market.

The company converted to a corporation in 1992, but a complicated three-tier share structure led to indebtedness as dividends paid to prime preferred stockholders further drained its finances. The firm filed a pre-packaged Chapter 11 bankruptcy case in 1995, emerging as a subsidiary of developer DMB Property Ventures and exiting its unprofitable operations in the Southeast. Shea Homes acquired UDC in 1998, at which time it was the largest homebuilder in Phoenix.

== History ==
UDC was founded by Gary Rosenberg in Chicago in 1968 and began operating as a company by 1972. The firm began developing Fountain of the Sun, an adult living community in Mesa, in 1971; home sales began in 1976, with models named the Pima, Papago, and Hopi. Over the course of the 1980s, UDC expanded beyond the Phoenix area. As early as 1980 with homes in the Rancho Bernardo development near San Diego, UDC entered California; while it built single-family homes in Southern California, its two developments in Northern California by 1991 were adult communities. In 1983, UDC bought Mulvaney Builders and entered the Charlotte, North Carolina, market. That same year, the firm opened its first development in Florida, an adult community in Boynton Beach.

UDC Development renamed itself UDC Homes in 1986; the name change coincided with a reorganization as a limited partnership, ending four years on the public markets, and the relocation of its operational headquarters from Chicago to Tempe, Arizona, which was completed in 1987. In the late 1980s, UDC established a reputation in the Phoenix high-end "move-up" market for homes that backed onto golf courses, artificial lakes, and mountains. It was the second-largest homebuilder in Phoenix in the early 1990s, with 1,654 permits in 1994 alone; that year, it was the ninth-largest homebuilder in the country. Likewise, Phoenix represented more than half of UDC's revenue for 1993. In Charlotte, it peaked at third in market share in 1992, with more than 300 housing permits issued, though it slid to fifth in 1994.

UDC entered the Tucson, Arizona, market in 1994 with the purchase of land in the Rancho Vistoso development in Oro Valley. This was its first new market since its 1987 entrances into Atlanta and Riverside, California. Citing a more sluggish real estate submarket than expected, the company exited Tucson in 1997 to focus on higher-volume areas.

In 1992, UDC Homes converted from a limited partnership to a public corporation so it could issue stock. After going public, UDC was saddled with issues, including $340 million in debt and softness in its Southeastern submarkets. Preferred units in the limited partnership were converted to prime preferred stock, with a high annual dividend, draining the company's profits and leading to payments it could not afford; UDC had to pay its prime preferred shareholders in stock instead of cash, which only increased the dividend requirement. It also struggled with writedowns on land it bought, mostly in southern California, in 1989–90, prior to a national recession. In 1994, officials began searching for a buyer for the homebuilder as its stock price steadily declined. No deal was reached, and in May 1995, UDC filed a pre-packaged Chapter 11 bankruptcy. As part of a debt restructuring, the company announced its intention to exit the Southeast.

UDC exited bankruptcy in November as a subsidiary of DMB Property Ventures, LP, in a $108 million transaction. Shortly after, AEW Capital Management acquired half of UDC from DMB. Litigation from the bankruptcy outlived the company. Shareholders split $12.7 million in a 1996 deal with UDC's officers and $4 million in a 1998 settlement with accountants Coopers & Lybrand, both over claims that UDC officers sought to inflate the firm's stock price and concealed the company's actual financial condition. Also implicated was auditor Arthur Andersen, which was cleared of wrongdoing in a 1999 civil jury trial but paid a $755,000 settlement to the state two years later. Under DMB management, UDC continued developing homes, including an aggressive effort to buy land in Southern California.

Shea Homes and Standard Pacific made offers to buy UDC in June 1998, by which time it had become the number-one homebuilder in Phoenix with 1,041 starts over the first six months. Shea acquired UDC for an undisclosed price that July; it was billed as the largest transaction in industry history, surpassing D. R. Horton's $350 million purchase of Phoenix builder Continental Homes earlier that year. Standard Pacific bought more than 100 parcels from the company.
