= Shea Homes =

American home building company

- Type: Subsidiary
- Industry: Homebuilding
- Founded: 1881; 145 years ago in Portland, Oregon
- Founder: John F. Shea
- Headquarters: Walnut, California, United States
- Area served: Arizona, California, Colorado, Florida, Nevada, North Carolina, South Carolina, Washington and Texas
- Key people: John F. Shea (founder); Bert Selva (CEO)
- Parent: J. F. Shea Co.
- Website: sheahomes.com

Shea Homes is an American homebuilding company. Founded in 1881, its major markets are the West Coast (California, Arizona, Nevada, Washington, and Colorado), Texas, the Carolinas, and Florida.

== History ==
Shea Homes’ parent company, the J. F. Shea Co., was founded in 1881 in Portland, Oregon by John Francis Shea. In 1997, J. F. Shea acquired the Mission Viejo Co., which owned land in Southern California and Colorado, from Phillip Morris. In 1998, it acquired UDC Homes, which had been the largest homebuilder in the Phoenix market and had a presence in California. In addition to being a new home builder, the J. F. Shea Company's activities include commercial construction, civil engineering, commercial and multi-family property development and management, construction materials and venture capital.

== Primary competitors ==
- Fulton Homes (in the Phoenix metropolitan area)
- Pulte Homes
- TRI Pointe Group
