= Nine Mile station =

Light rail station in Aurora, Colorado

Nine Mile
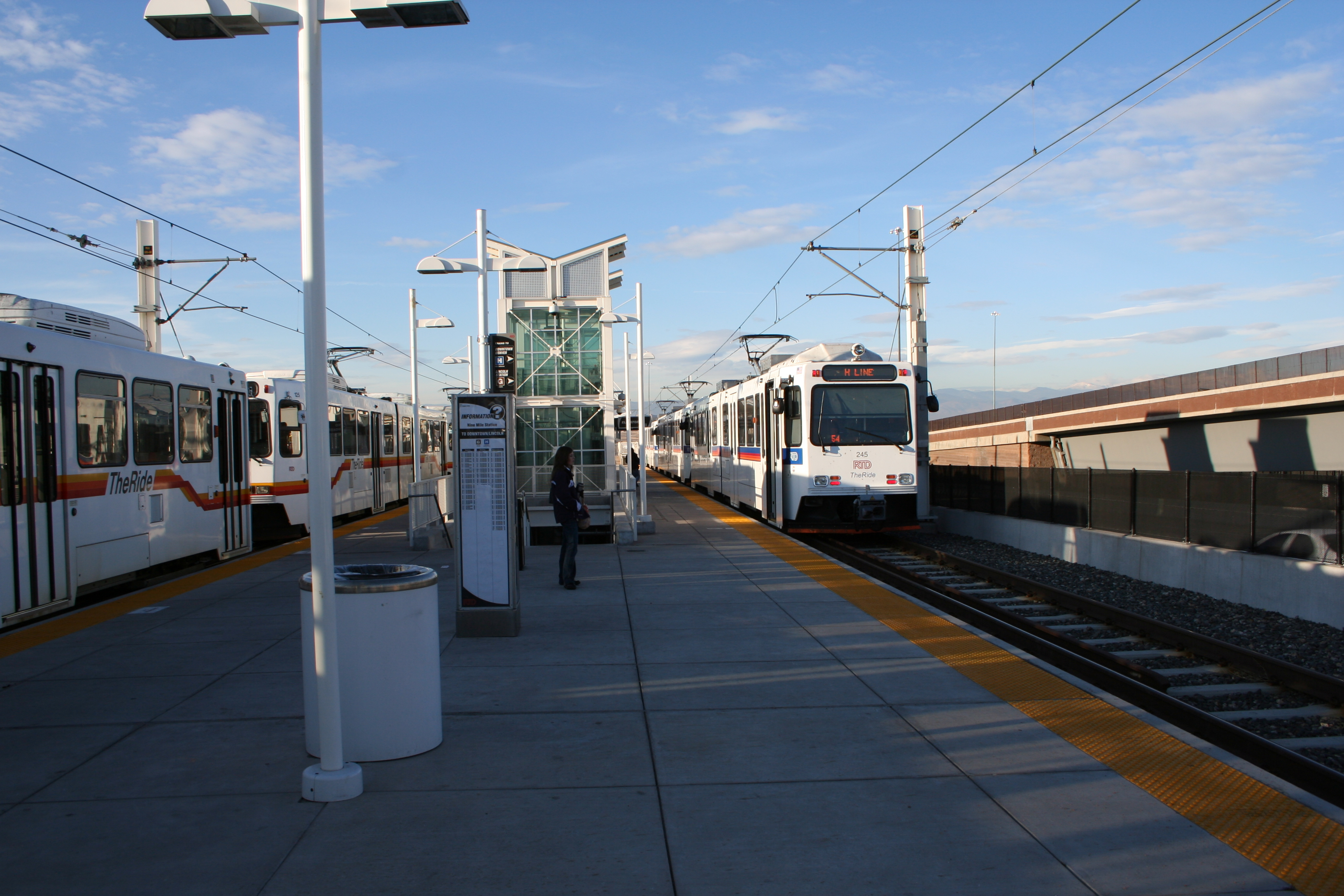

General information
- Location: 3179 South Parker Road; Aurora, Colorado
- Coordinates: 39.6577°N 104.8446°W
- Owner: Regional Transportation District
- Line: Southeast Corridor
- Platforms: 1 island platform
- Tracks: 2
- Connections: RTD Bus: 35, 83D, 83L, 121, 130, 133, 135, 139, 483, AT, ATA

Construction
- Structure type: Freeway median, above grade
- Parking: 1,225 spaces,
- Cycle facilities: 16 racks, 28 lockers, Colorado Front Range Trail
- Accessible: Yes

History
- Opened: November 17, 2006

Passengers
- 2025: 1,629 (average daily)
- Rank: 20 out of 75

Services
| Preceding station | RTD | Following station |
|---|---|---|
| Iliff toward Peoria | R Line | Dayton toward RidgeGate Parkway |
Former services
| Preceding station | RTD | Following station |
|---|---|---|
| Terminus | G Line (2006–2009) | Dayton toward Lincoln |
Future services
| Preceding station | RTD | Following station |
|---|---|---|
| Iliff toward Florida | H Line Suspended | Dayton toward 18th & California |
Location

Nine Mile station is an RTD light rail station in Aurora, Colorado, United States. The station opened on November 17, 2006, and is operated by the Regional Transportation District. It is currently served by the R Line.

When the station opened in 2006, it was the outbound terminus of the G and H Lines. The G Line was discontinued in 2009; after the R Line began operations over the G Line's former route in 2017, the terminus of the H Line was extended northeast to Florida station. The H Line is currently suspended due to the Downtown Rail Reconstruction Project; passengers wishing to follow the H Line's typical service pattern must use the R and E Lines to do so, with a transfer at Belleview, until the project is complete.

== Station layout ==
2F

Platform Level

← I-225 northbound
Northbound
← toward Peoria (Iliff)
Island platform, doors will open on the left
Southbound
toward RidgeGate Parkway (Dayton) →
I-225 southbound →
1F
Pedestrian tunnel
SH 83 / Parker Road; bus bays; parking

The station is in the median of Interstate 225. A pedestrian tunnel under the southbound lanes links the station to its bus bays and parking lot, located in the middle of the interchange between I-225 and Parker Road. The station serves as a major transit hub for southeast Denver and south Aurora. The AT and ATA bus routes provide nonstop service from Nine Mile to Denver International Airport, often completing the journey quicker (albeit much less frequently) than the R Line.

Nine Mile station is named after, and built at the approximate location of, the historic Nine Mile House, one of several stage stops along the Smoky Hill Trail. This stop was nine miles from Denver.
