= Iliff station =

Light rail station in Aurora, Colorado

Iliff
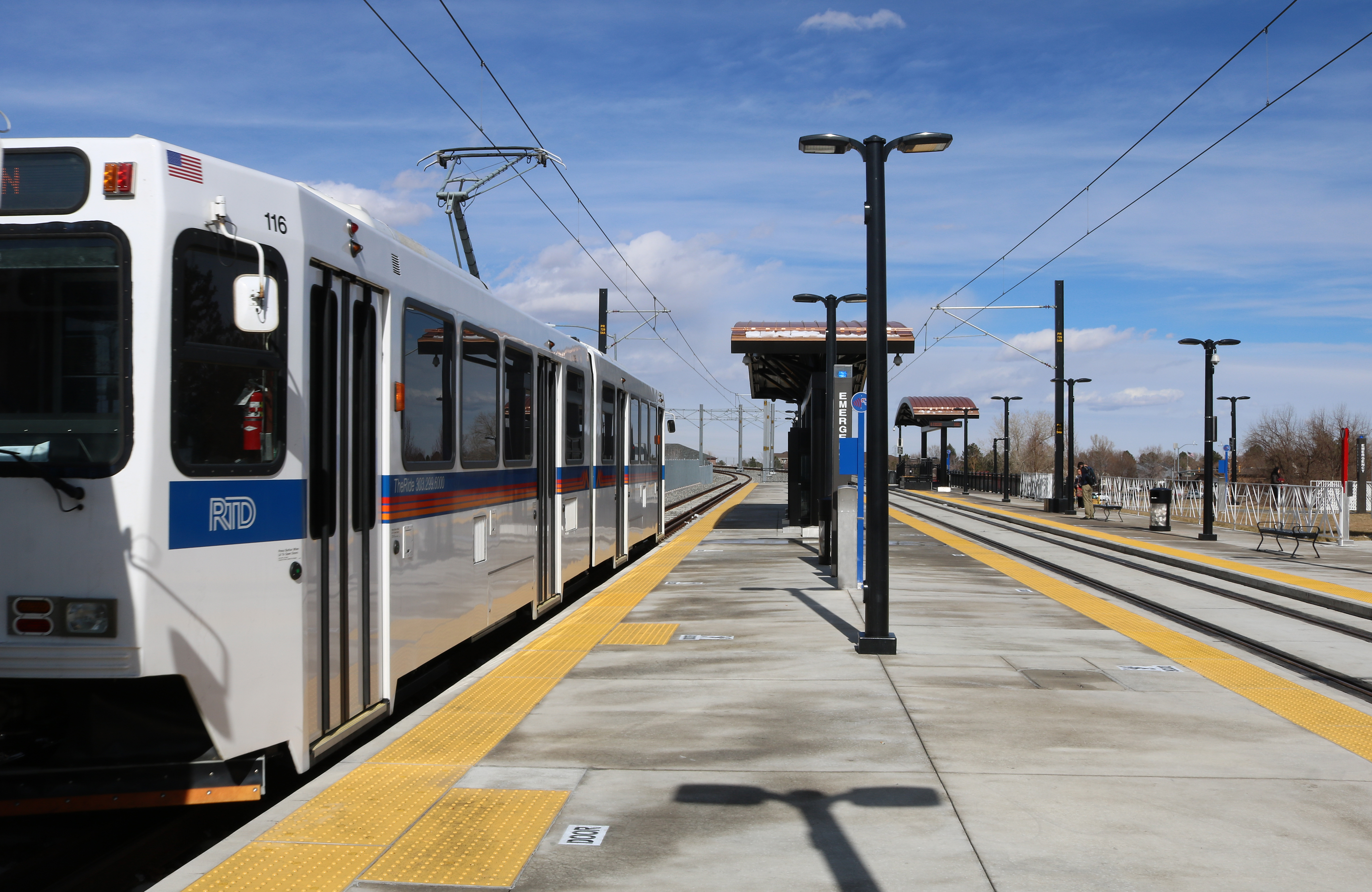
- Iliff station in February 2017

General information
- Location: 14030 East Iliff Avenue; Aurora, Colorado
- Coordinates: 39.6733°N 104.8269°W
- Owner: Regional Transportation District
- Line: I-225 Corridor
- Platforms: 1 side platform, 1 island platform

Construction
- Structure type: At-grade
- Parking: 600 spaces
- Cycle facilities: 8 racks
- Accessible: Yes

History
- Opened: February 24, 2017

Passengers
- 2025: 887 (average daily)
- Rank: 39 out of 75

Services
Preceding station	RTD	Following station
Florida toward Peoria	R Line	Nine Mile toward RidgeGate Parkway
Future services
Preceding station	RTD	Following station
Florida Terminus	H Line Suspended	Nine Mile toward 18th & California
Location

Iliff station is a Regional Transportation District (RTD) light rail station in Aurora, Colorado. The station opened on February 24, 2017, and is currently served by the R Line.

Iliff is typically served by the H Line, which is currently suspended due to the Downtown Rail Reconstruction Project. Passengers wishing to follow the H Line's typical service pattern must use the R and E Lines to do so, with a transfer at Belleview, until the project is complete.

== Station layout ==
1F

Platform Level

East Iliff Avenue; South Blackhawk Street; parking
Side platform, northbound only; doors will open on the right
Northbound
← toward Peoria (Florida)
Island platform, southbound only; doors will open on the left
Southbound
toward RidgeGate Parkway (Nine Mile) →
I-225

The station is located alongside Interstate 225 at Iliff Avenue, a little more than one block west of South Blackhawk Street. Iliff station has a 600 space parking structure owned and operated by the City of Aurora. A transit-oriented development project including 424 residences is under construction southeast of the station. There are no bus connections from this station.
