= 2nd Avenue & Abilene station =

Light rail station in Aurora, Colorado

2nd Ave•Abilene
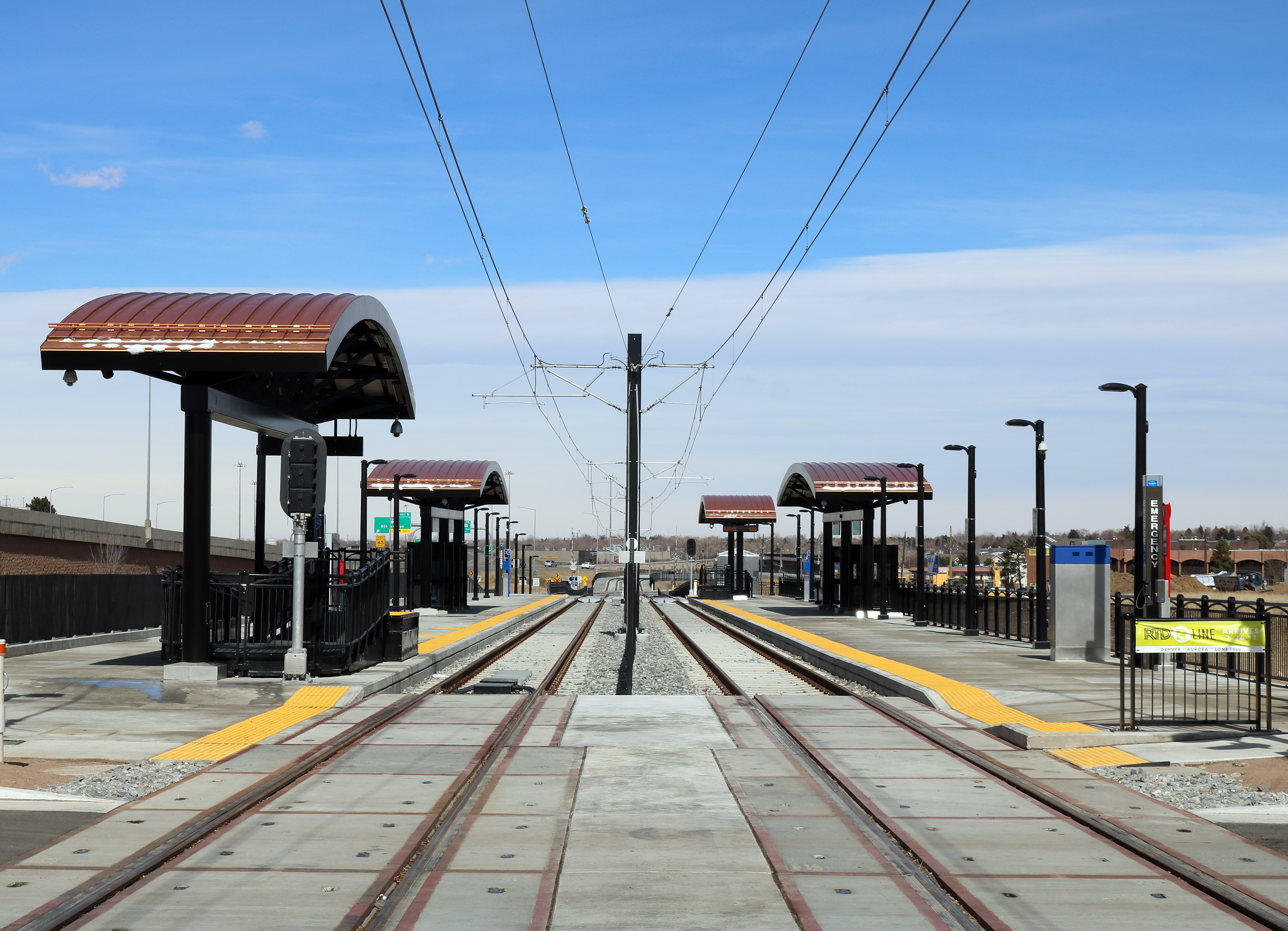
- 2nd Avenue & Abilene station platform in February 2017

General information
- Other names: 2nd & Abilene
- Location: 14051 East Ellsworth Avenue; Aurora, Colorado
- Coordinates: 39°43′10.0″N 104°49′32.4″W
- Owner: Regional Transportation District
- Line: I-225 Corridor
- Platforms: 2 side platforms
- Tracks: 2
- Connections: RTD Bus: 6

Construction
- Structure type: At-grade
- Cycle facilities: 4 racks
- Accessible: Yes

History
- Opened: February 24, 2017

Passengers
- 2025: 307 (average daily)
- Rank: 66 out of 75

Services
| Preceding station | RTD | Following station |
|---|---|---|
| 13th Avenue toward Peoria | R Line | Aurora Metro Center toward RidgeGate Parkway |
Location

2nd Avenue & Abilene station (sometimes referred to as 2nd & Abilene and stylized as 2nd Ave•Abilene) is a Regional Transportation District (RTD) light rail station on the R Line in Aurora, Colorado. The station opened on February 24, 2017, along with the rest of the R Line.

== Station layout ==
2F
I-225
1F

Platform Level

Side platform, doors will open on the right
Northbound
← toward Peoria (13th Avenue)
Southbound
toward RidgeGate Parkway (Aurora Metro Center) →
Side platform, doors will open on the right
Abilene Street; bus bays

Interstate 225 runs on an elevated viaduct adjacent to the station. The area to the immediate east of the station is sparsely developed. East 2nd Avenue provides access to residential areas west of the station and I-225 via a freeway underpass. The station's bus bays are located on East 2nd Avenue.
