= Dayton station =

Light rail station in Aurora, Colorado

Dayton
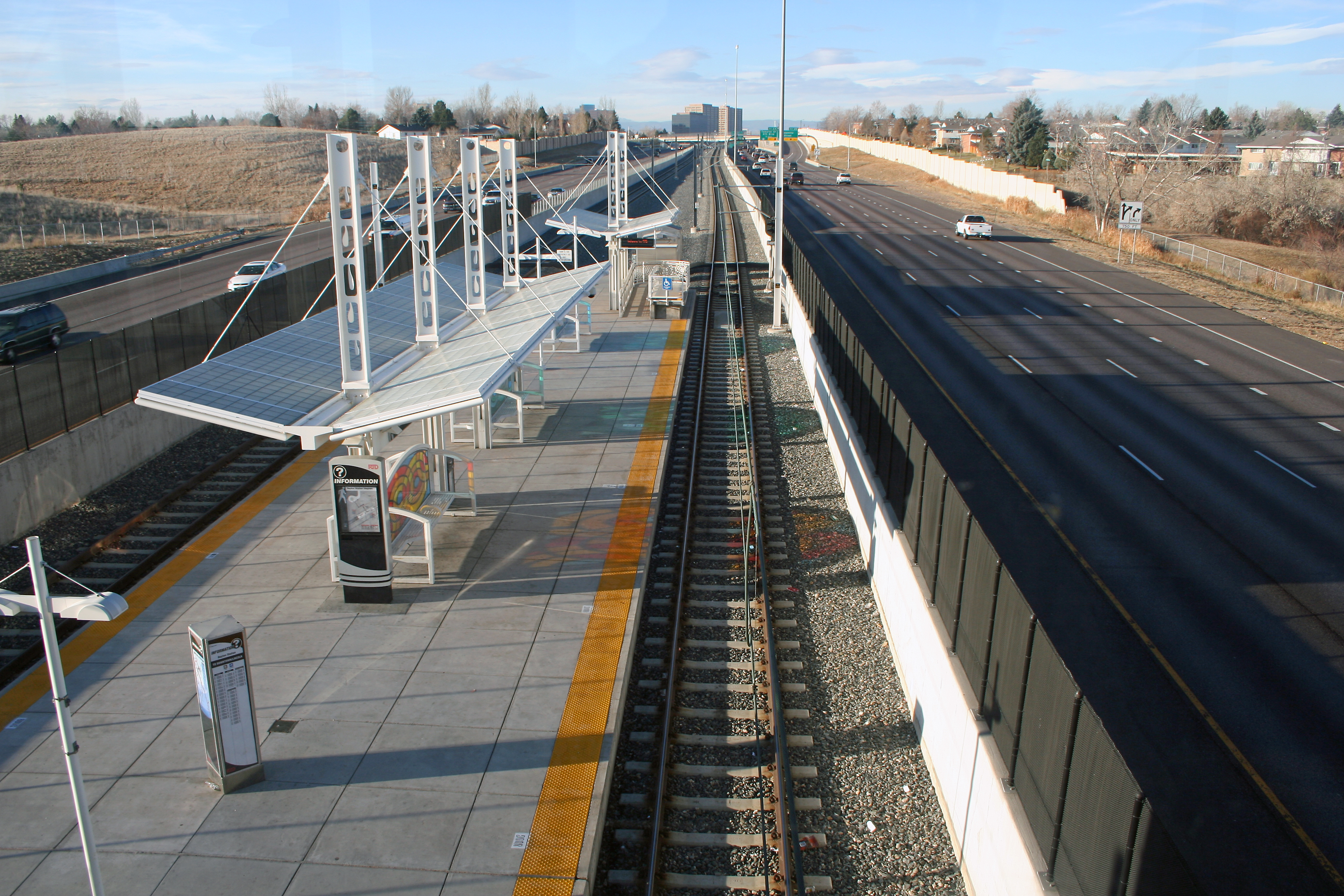
- Dayton station platform, located in the middle of Interstate 225, as seen from the pedestrian bridge that provides access to the station from the west side of the freeway.

General information
- Location: 4151 South Dallas Street; Aurora, Colorado
- Coordinates: 39.6428°N 104.8781°W
- Owner: Regional Transportation District
- Line: Southeast Corridor
- Platforms: 1 island platform
- Tracks: 2

Construction
- Structure type: Freeway median, at-grade
- Parking: 250 spaces
- Cycle facilities: 16 racks, 8 lockers
- Accessible: Yes

History
- Opened: November 17, 2006

Passengers
- 2025: 572 (average daily)
- Rank: 54 out of 75

Services
Preceding station	RTD	Following station
Nine Mile toward Peoria	R Line	Belleview toward RidgeGate Parkway
Former services
Preceding station	RTD	Following station
Nine Mile Terminus	G Line (2006–2009)	Belleview toward Lincoln
Future services
Preceding station	RTD	Following station
Nine Mile toward Florida	H Line Suspended	Southmoor toward 18th & California
Location

Dayton station is an RTD light rail station in Aurora, Colorado. The station was opened on November 17, 2006, and is operated by the Regional Transportation District. It is currently served by the R Line.

Dayton is typically served by the H Line, which is currently suspended due to the Downtown Rail Reconstruction Project. Passengers wishing to follow the H Line's typical service pattern must use the R and E Lines to do so, with a transfer at Belleview, until the project is complete.

== Station layout ==
2F
Pedestrian bridge
1F

Platform Level

← I-225 northbound
Northbound
← toward Peoria (Nine Mile)
Island platform, doors will open on the left
Southbound
toward RidgeGate Parkway (Belleview) →
I-225 southbound →
Parking

The station is in the median of Interstate 225. A pedestrian bridge over the southbound lanes connects to a 250-space parking lot. The Village Greens Trail runs from the station's parking lot across I-225 on a separate bridge to provide access to Village Greens Park. There are no bus connections from this station.
