= Aurora Metro Center station =

Light rail station in Aurora, Colorado

Aurora Metro Center
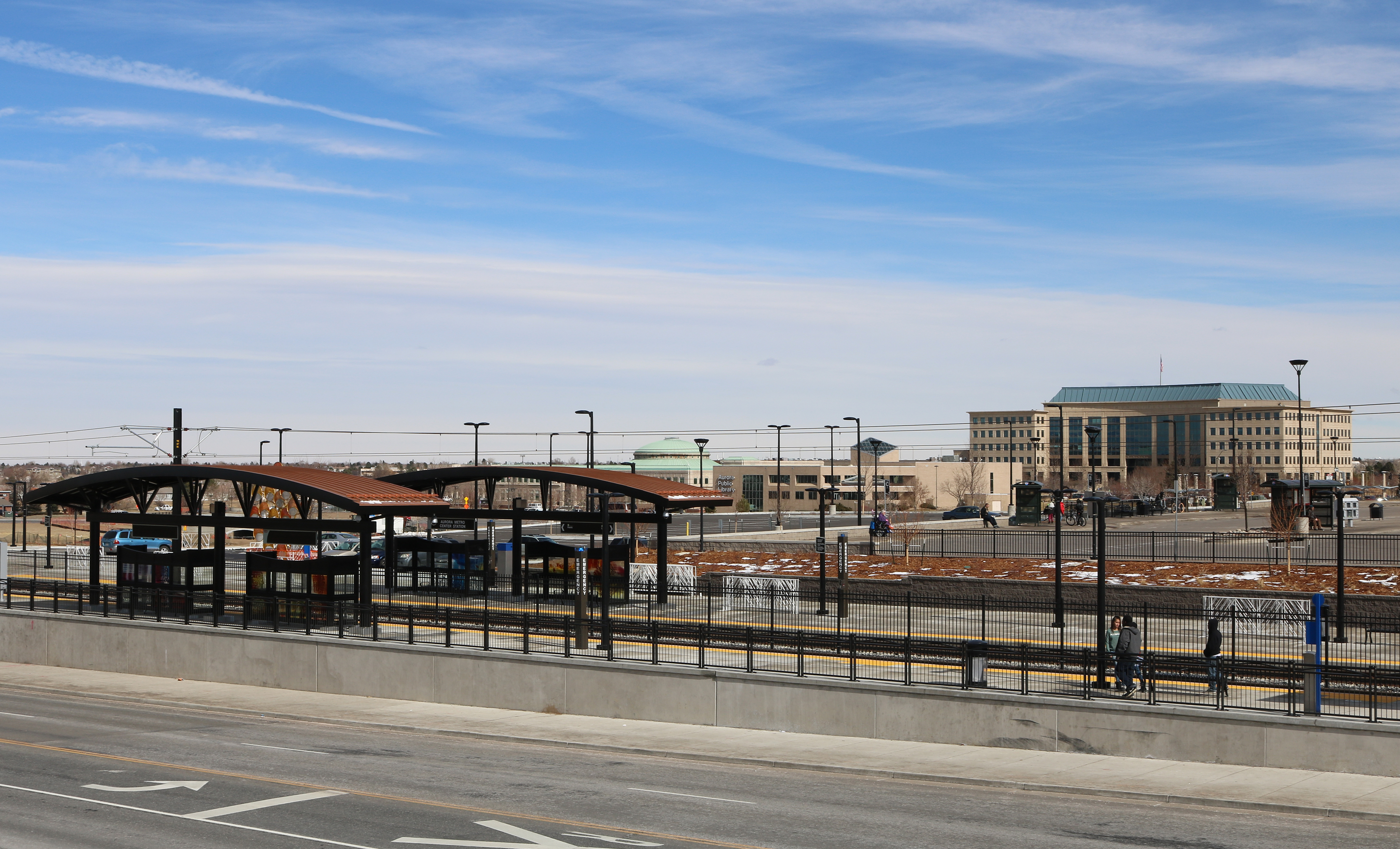
- Aurora Metro Center station in February 2017

General information
- Location: 14555 East Centrepoint Drive; Aurora, Colorado
- Coordinates: 39°42′31.7″N 104°49′08.7″W
- Owner: Regional Transportation District
- Line: I-225 Corridor
- Platforms: 2 side platforms
- Tracks: 2
- Connections: RTD Bus: 3, 3L, 6, 11, 15L, 21, 130, 133, 153

Construction
- Structure type: At-grade
- Parking: 145 spaces
- Cycle facilities: 4 racks
- Accessible: Yes

History
- Opened: February 24, 2017

Passengers
- 2025: 788 (average daily)
- Rank: 41 out of 75

Services
Preceding station	RTD	Following station
2nd Avenue & Abilene toward Peoria	R Line	Florida toward RidgeGate Parkway
Location

Aurora Metro Center station is a Regional Transportation District (RTD) light rail station on the R Line in Aurora, Colorado. The station is located roughly equidistant between the Town Center at Aurora shopping mall and the Aurora Municipal Center, which contains Aurora's city hall, police headquarters, central library, and history museum.

== Station layout ==
1F

Platform Level

Aurora Municipal Center; bus bays; parking
Side platform, doors will open on the right
Northbound
← toward Peoria (2nd & Abilene)
Southbound
toward RidgeGate Parkway (Florida) →
Side platform, doors will open on the right
South Sable Boulevard; Town Center at Aurora

The station opened on February 24, 2017, along with the rest of the R Line. The station was built next to - and superseded as a transit hub - a bus transfer center located at Centrepoint Drive and Sable Boulevard. The transfer center was renamed to Aurora Metro Center when the R Line began operation in order to match the station name. It has a 145-stall park-and-ride lot.

The R Line runs in mixed traffic through the immediate vicinity of the station, along East Ellsworth Avenue, South Sable Boulevard, and East Exposition Avenue.
