= R Line (RTD) =

Light rail line in the Denver metropolitan area

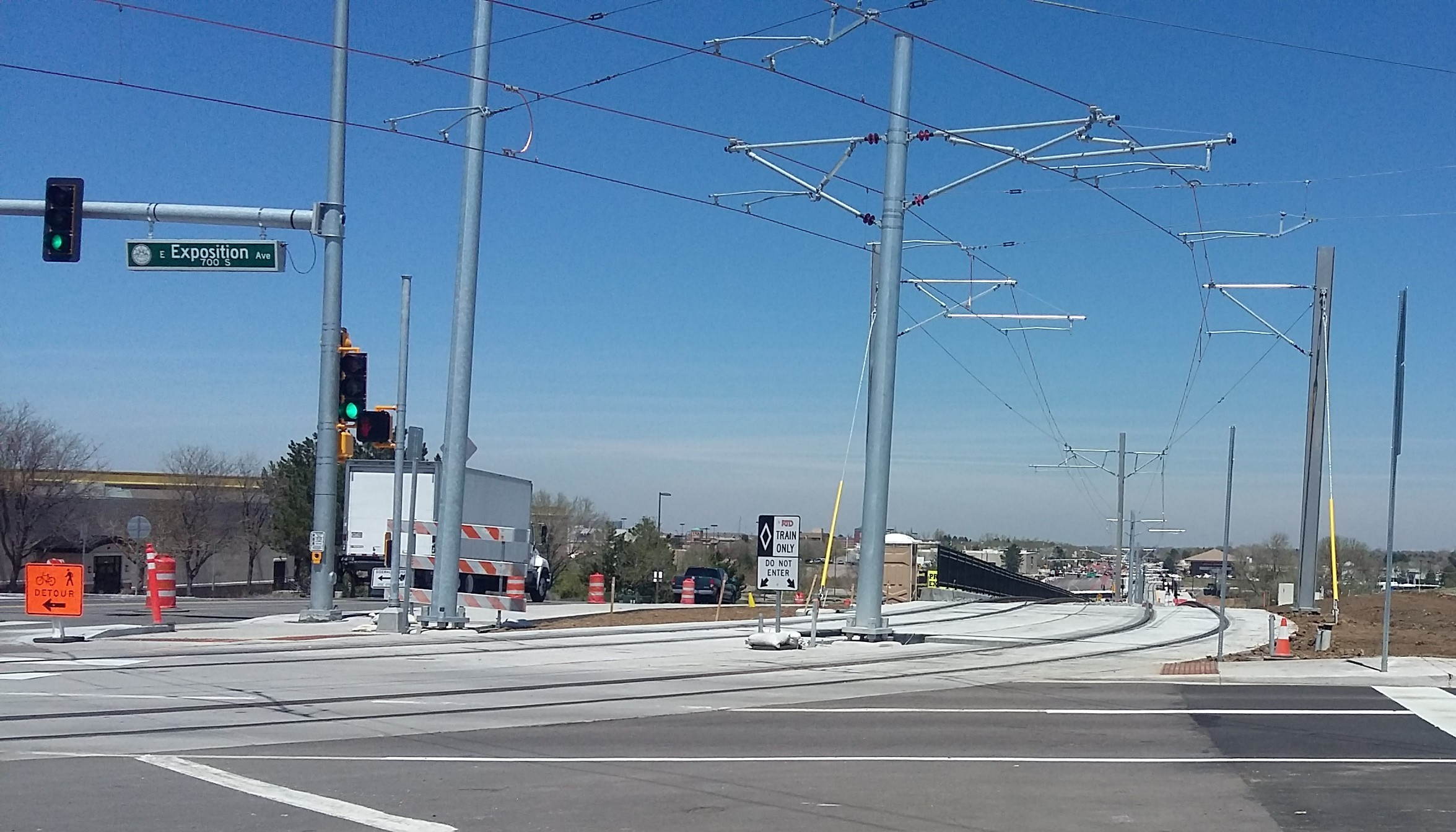
- R Line tracks at the intersection of E Exposition Ave and S Sable Blvd prior to operation

Overview
- Other name: I-225 Line
- Owner: Regional Transportation District
- Locale: Denver metropolitan area
- Termini: Peoria; Lincoln
- Stations: 16

Service
- Type: Light rail
- System: RTD Rail
- Operator: Regional Transportation District
- Ridership: 1,097,000 (FY2023, annual)

History
- Opened: November 17, 2006 (G Line)
- Closed: May 3, 2009 (G Line)
- Reopened: February 24, 2017 (R Line)

Technical
- Track gauge: 4 ft 8 1/2 in (1,435 mm) standard gauge
- Electrification: Overhead line, 750 V DC
Route map
R Line highlighted in green

The R Line is a Regional Transportation District (RTD) light rail line that serves stations in Aurora, Denver, Greenwood Village, Centennial and Lone Tree, Colorado. The line began operation on February 24, 2017. During planning and construction, it was known as the I-225 Line. The line received its letter designation to reflect the letter Rs in "Aurora" and "RidgeGate". The line travels over newer and older portions of the RTD light rail system, and is the only line in the RTD rail system that does not serve downtown Denver. It is colored lime green on system maps.

The R Line's northern terminus is Peoria station in Aurora, and its southern terminus is Lincoln station in Lone Tree. As of 2026, service has been temporarily extended south of Lincoln to RidgeGate Parkway Station. This configuration will remain through the completion of the Downtown Rail Reconstruction Project, at which point the R Line terminus will return to Lincoln.

== History ==
=== G Line (2006 - 2009) ===
November 17, 2006 saw the completion of the Southeast Corridor light rail project (part of the Transportation Expansion Project). One of the four routes that were part of the RTD’s service plan for the corridor, the route between Aurora and Lone Tree, was named the G Line and assigned the color brown. The G Line’s northern terminus was at Nine Mile station in Aurora on the I-225 branch of the system, shared with the H Line, while its southern terminus was at Lincoln station in Lone Tree, shared with the E and F Lines.

In August 2007, night, Saturday, Sunday and holiday service was discontinued due to low ridership. Service was further reduced to peak hour-only in August 2008 before being suspended entirely on May 3, 2009. RTD would later re-use the G Line designation for a commuter rail service between Union Station and Wheat Ridge.

The table below shows the G Line's final service pattern and connections in 2009.

Community	Station	Opened	Connections & notes
Aurora	Nine Mile	November 17, 2006	Park and ride: 1,225 spaces
Aurora	Dayton	November 17, 2006	Park and ride: 250 spaces
Denver	Belleview	November 17, 2006	Park and ride: 817 spaces
Greenwood Village	Orchard	November 17, 2006	Park and ride: 48 spaces
Greenwood Village	Arapahoe at Village Center	November 17, 2006	Park and ride: 817 spaces
Centennial	Dry Creek	November 17, 2006	Park and ride: 235 spaces
Lone Tree	County Line	November 17, 2006	Park and ride: 388 spaces
Lone Tree	Lincoln	November 17, 2006	Park and ride: 1,734 spaces

=== R Line (2017 - present) ===
The 2004 voter-approved FasTracks initiative marked the return of the Aurora-Lone Tree corridor. The service running along the corridor was named the R Line, and its completion facilitated a circumferential link between the E and H Lines and the A Line. The project included seven new stations and provided 1,800 new parking spaces. Construction began in spring 2012 on a short section of the line as part of a joint contract with the Colorado Department of Transportation. Following an unsolicited proposal from Kiewit Corporation, funding was secured for the full line, which was expected to open in winter 2016. The opening date was later pushed back. On January 30, 2017, RTD announced that the R Line would begin service on February 24, 2017. Operations commenced on that day, along with an extension of the H Line to the newly constructed Florida station in Aurora.

==== Extension to RidgeGate Parkway ====
RTD sent four teams a Request for Proposal for the Southeast Corridor extension, consisting of 2.3 miles (3.7 km) of new track south of Lincoln station that would serve three new stations: Sky Ridge Medical Center, Lone Tree City Center, and a new terminus at RidgeGate Parkway. On July 28, 2015, a design-build contract for the extension was awarded to Balfour Beatty Infrastructure Inc. Design on the extension began in fall 2015 and construction began in 2016. The extension opened on May 17, 2019. This service pattern would be short-lived, as R Line service was cut back to Lincoln in 2020 due to the COVID-19 pandemic. This service change has persisted since the pandemic due to low demand south of Lincoln.

In June 2026, R Line service to RidgeGate Parkway was restored due to the Downtown Rail Reconstruction Project. This project prompted the suspension of the H Line for construction, with increased service on the R Line and a temporary "T Line" replacing H Line capacity. This service change is temporary and the R Line's southern terminus will return to Lincoln when complete.

== Route ==
The R Line travels south from Peoria station in northwest Aurora. The line follows Sand Creek to East Colfax Avenue, where it meets Interstate 225. It then follows I-225 south, mostly along a dedicated right-of-way with a smaller street-running portion through central Aurora. It meets the H Line at its outbound terminus at Florida station. The two lines travel together to Dayton station; at I-225's southern terminus at Interstate 25, the H Line splits off north towards downtown Denver while the R Line splits off south towards the Denver Tech Center. It joins the E Line north of Belleview station. The two lines travel together alongside I-25 to the R Line's terminus at Lincoln station in Lone Tree.

The R Line is the primary public transit corridor for travel between Denver's southeastern suburbs - Centennial, Greenwood Village, and Lone Tree - and Denver International Airport. Passengers bound for the airport transfer to A Line trains at Peoria.

== Stations ==
Community	Station	Opened	Connections & notes
Aurora	Peoria	April 22, 2016	37, 45, 121, 153; Park and ride: 550 spaces
Aurora	Fitzsimons	February 24, 2017	
Aurora	Colfax	February 24, 2017	LYNX, 10, 15, 15L, 20, FF5
Aurora	13th Avenue	February 24, 2017	Park and ride: 242 spaces
Aurora	2nd Avenue & Abilene	February 24, 2017	6 Park and ride: 262 spaces
Aurora	Aurora Metro Center	February 24, 2017	3, 3L, 6, 11, 15L, 21, 130, 133, 153; Park and ride: 145 spaces
Aurora	Florida	February 24, 2017	11
Aurora	Iliff	February 24, 2017	21; Park and ride: 600 spaces
Aurora	Nine Mile	November 17, 2006	35, 83D, 83L, 121, 130, 133, 135, 139, 483, AT, ATA; Park and ride: 1,225 spaces
Aurora	Dayton	November 17, 2006	Park and ride: 250 spaces
Denver	Belleview	November 17, 2006	73; Park and ride: 59 spaces
Greenwood Village	Orchard	November 17, 2006	Park and ride: 48 spaces
Greenwood Village	Arapahoe at Village Center	November 17, 2006	66, 153, 169, AT, ATA; Park and ride: 817 spaces
Centennial	Dry Creek	November 17, 2006	Park and ride: 235 spaces
Lone Tree	County Line	November 17, 2006	402L; Park and ride: 388 spaces
Lone Tree	Lincoln	November 17, 2006	483; Park and ride: 1,734 spaces
Lone Tree	Sky Ridge	May 17, 2019	Mainline rail interchange
Lone Tree	Lone Tree City Center	May 17, 2019	Mainline rail interchange
Lone Tree	RidgeGate Parkway	May 17, 2019	Park and ride: 1,300 spaces
