= Florida station (RTD) =

Light rail station in Aurora, Colorado

Florida
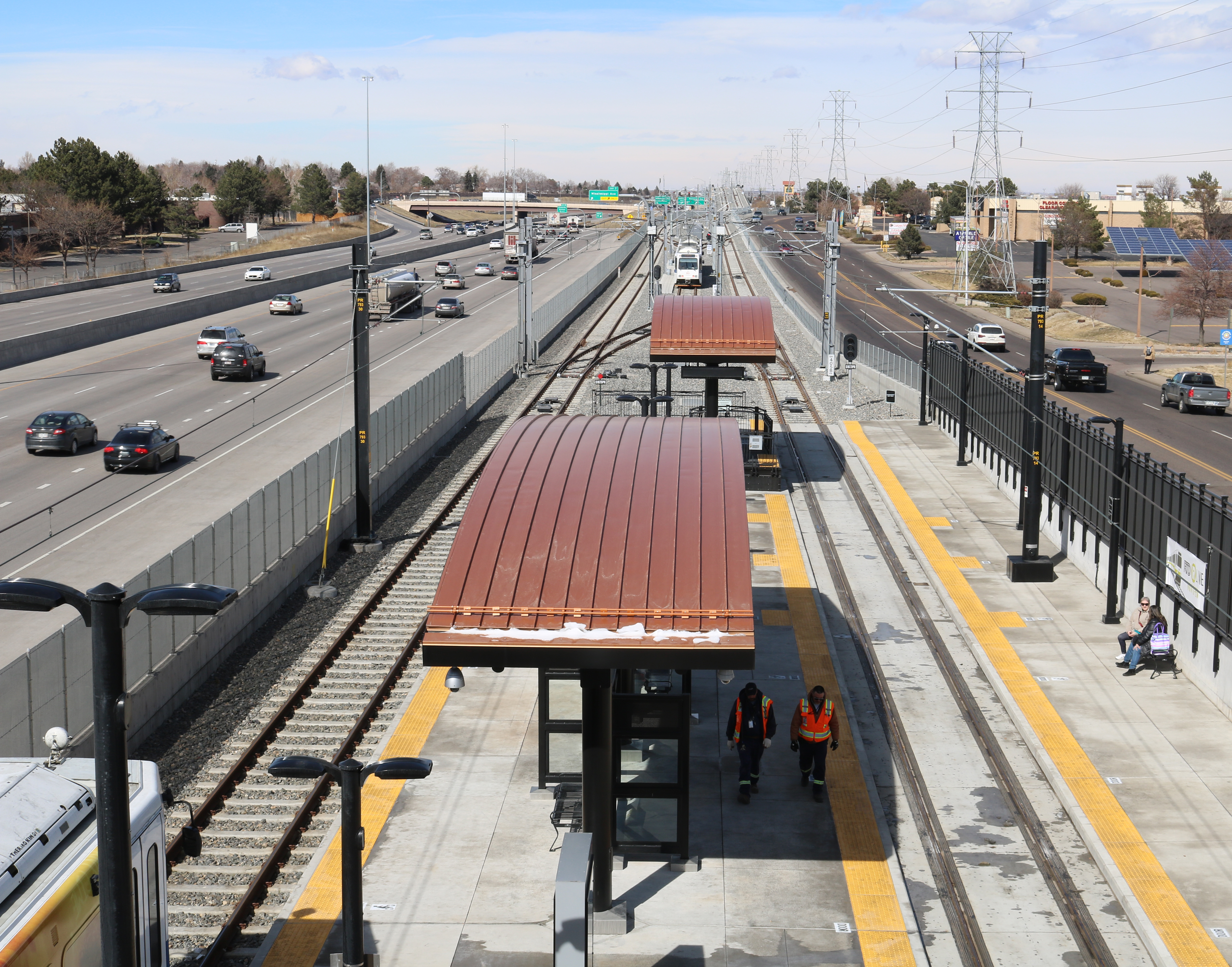
- Florida station in February 2017

General information
- Location: 1490 South Abilene Street; Aurora, Colorado
- Coordinates: 39.6899°N 104.8285°W
- Owner: Regional Transportation District
- Line: I-225 Corridor
- Platforms: 1 side platform, 1 island platform
- Tracks: 2

Construction
- Structure type: At-grade
- Cycle facilities: 4 racks
- Accessible: Yes

History
- Opened: February 24, 2017

Passengers
- 2025: 1,161 (average daily)
- Rank: 17 out of 75

Services
Preceding station	RTD	Following station
Aurora Metro Center toward Peoria	R Line	Iliff toward RidgeGate Parkway
Future services
Preceding station	RTD	Following station
Terminus	H Line Suspended	Iliff toward 18th & California
Location

Florida station is an RTD light rail station in Aurora, Colorado, United States. The station opened on February 24, 2017, and is currently served by the R Line.

Florida is typically served by the H Line, which is currently suspended due to the Downtown Rail Reconstruction Project. It is the typical outbound terminus of the H Line, and the designated transfer point for southbound R Line passengers to continue toward the Denver Tech Center, Centennial, and Lone Tree, or transfer to H Line trains toward downtown Denver. H Line passengers must transfer to R Line trains at this station to continue north toward Denver International Airport. While the Downtown Rail Reconstruction Project is ongoing, passengers wishing to follow the H Line's typical inbound service pattern must use the R and E Lines to do so, with a transfer at Belleview.

== Station layout ==
2F
Pedestrian bridge
1F

Platform Level

East Florida Avenue; South Abilene Street
Side platform, northbound only; doors will open on the right
Northbound
← toward Peoria (Aurora Metro Center)
Island platform, southbound only; doors will open on the left
Southbound
toward RidgeGate Parkway (Iliff) →
I-225
HCA HealthONE Aurora

The station's pedestrian bridge crosses Interstate 225 and connects it with HCA HealthONE Aurora and its medical offices, as well as residential areas on the west side of I-225. During planning and construction, RTD designated the station's name as "Medical Center of Aurora", referencing the name of the hospital at the time. This reference was dropped prior to the station's opening on February 24, 2017.

The station does not have a parking lot or bus connections.
