= Belleview station =

Light rail station in Denver, Colorado

Belleview
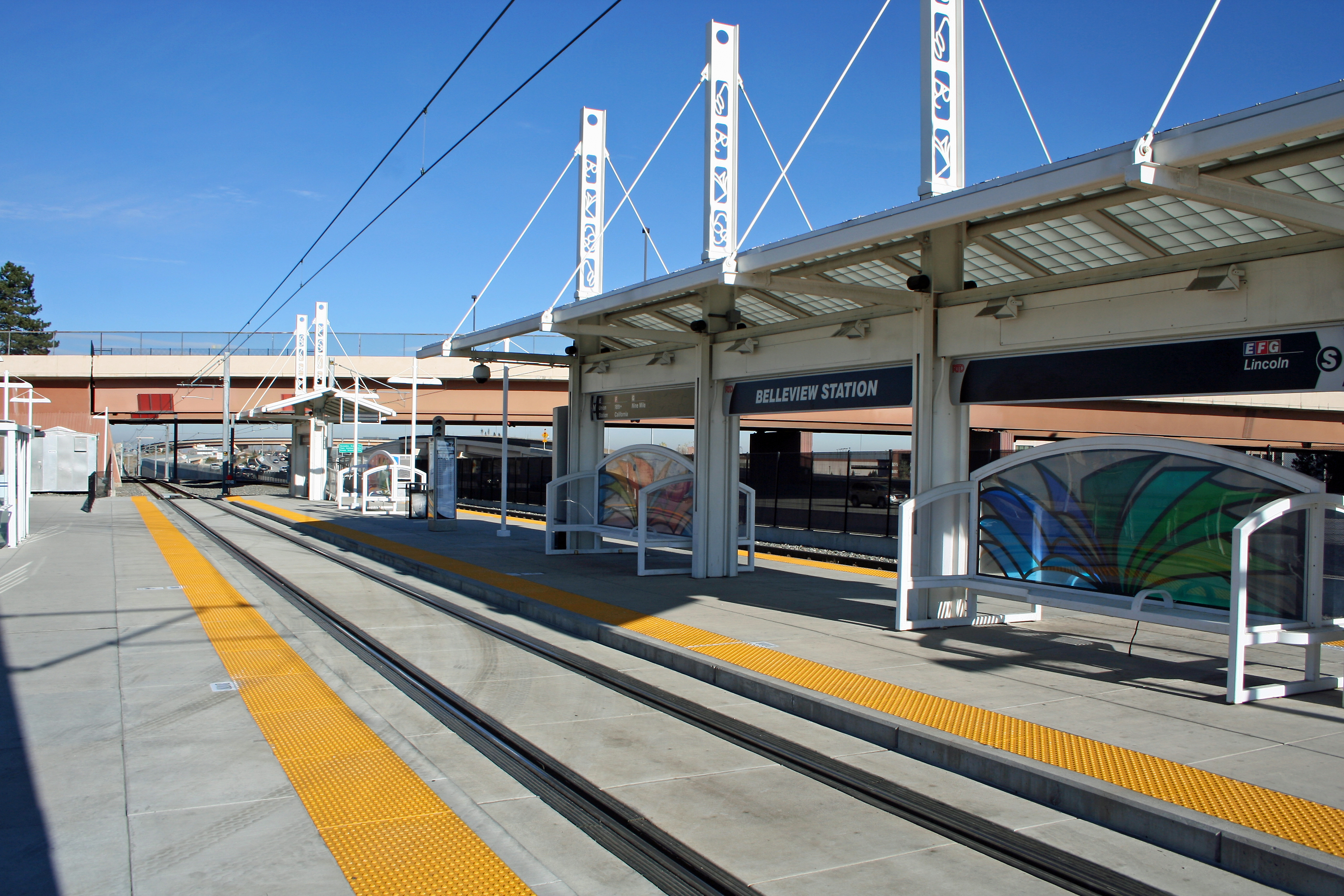
- Belleview station platform, looking north

General information
- Location: 4855 South Quebec Street; Denver, Colorado
- Coordinates: 39.6279°N 104.9046°W
- Owner: Regional Transportation District
- Line: Southeast Corridor
- Platforms: 1 island platform, 1 side platform
- Tracks: 2
- Connections: RTD Bus: 73, Belleview FlexRide

Construction
- Parking: 59 spaces
- Cycle facilities: 12 racks, 12 lockers
- Accessible: Yes

History
- Opened: November 17, 2006

Passengers
- 2025: 1,364 (average daily)
- Rank: 27 out of 75

Services
Preceding station	RTD	Following station
Southmoor toward Union Station	E Line	Orchard toward RidgeGate Parkway
Dayton toward Peoria	R Line	Orchard toward RidgeGate Parkway
Southmoor toward Alameda	T Line	Orchard toward Lincoln
Former services
Preceding station	RTD	Following station
Southmoor toward 18th & California	F Line	Orchard toward RidgeGate Parkway
Dayton toward Nine Mile	G Line (2006–2009)	Orchard toward Lincoln
Location

Belleview station is a light rail station in Denver, Colorado. It is operated by the Regional Transportation District (RTD), and was opened on November 17, 2006. It is currently served by the E, R, and T Lines.

Belleview is the primary station serving the Denver Tech Center, and is the last station southeast from Union Station to be located within the city of Denver. It is the last station shared between the E, R, and T Lines northbound from Lincoln, and the last transfer point for passengers travelling north to downtown Denver on the E Line, and northeast to Aurora and Denver International Airport on the R Line.

As of September 2026, the H Line is suspended due to the Downtown Rail Reconstruction Project. Belleview is therefore the interim transfer point for passengers wishing to travel the H Line's typical service corridor.

== Station layout ==
1F

Platform Level

I-25
Northbound
← toward Union Station (Southmoor)
← toward Peoria (Dayton)
← toward Alameda (Southmoor)
Island platform, northbound only; doors will open on the left
Southbound
toward RidgeGate Parkway (Orchard) →
toward Lincoln (Orchard) →
Side platform, southbound only; doors will open on the right
South Quebec Street; bus bays; parking

The station features a public art installation of a geometric pattern of roadway reflectors entitled Thunder over the Rockies, installed in the station's pedestrian tunnel. Thunder over the Rockies was created by Richard C. "Dick" Elliott and dedicated in 2006.

The station is the centerpiece of a planned mixed-use transit-oriented development. The development includes 900 residential units, 800,000 square feet of office space, and 130,000 square feet of retail and restaurant space, with more under construction.

Unlike other stations paralleling Interstate 25 between this station and Lincoln, there is no dedicated pedestrian bridge crossing the freeway. Passengers must use one of two staircases up to East Union Avenue, and use it to cross.
