= Interstate 225 =

Highway in Colorado

Interstate 225
- I-225 highlighted in red

Route information
- Auxiliary route of I-25
- Maintained by CDOT
- Length: 11.959 mi (19.246 km)
- Existed: 1976–present
- NHS: Entire route

Major junctions
- South end: I-25 / US 87 in Denver
- I-70 BL / US 40 / US 287 in Aurora
- North end: I-70 / US 36 in Aurora and Denver

Location
- Country: United States
- State: Colorado
- Counties: Denver, Arapahoe, Adams

Highway system
- Interstate Highway System; Main; Auxiliary; Suffixed; Business; Future; Colorado State Highway System; Interstate; US; State; Scenic
← SH 224	→ SH 227

Interstate 225 (I-225) is an auxiliary Interstate Highway in the U.S. state of Colorado. The freeway is a 11.959-mile-long (19.246 km) connector spur route of I-25 that acts as an eastern bypass in the Denver metropolitan area and serves Aurora. It also provides direct access to Denver International Airport for the Denver Tech Center and the southern suburbs of Denver. I-225 is one of the two existing auxiliary Interstate Highways in Colorado and it is the only auxiliary route of I-25. The route begins at I-25 in the Denver Tech Center and runs north to I-70 north of Aurora. It interchanges with State Highway 83 (SH 83), SH 30 and I-70 Business/US 40/US 287, known locally as Colfax Avenue. The freeway was first proposed in the 1950s along with the first Interstate Highways within Denver. Construction did not begin until 1964 at the I-70 interchange and proceeded south through Aurora until final completion in early 1976 with the final link to I-25 opening to traffic.

== Route description ==
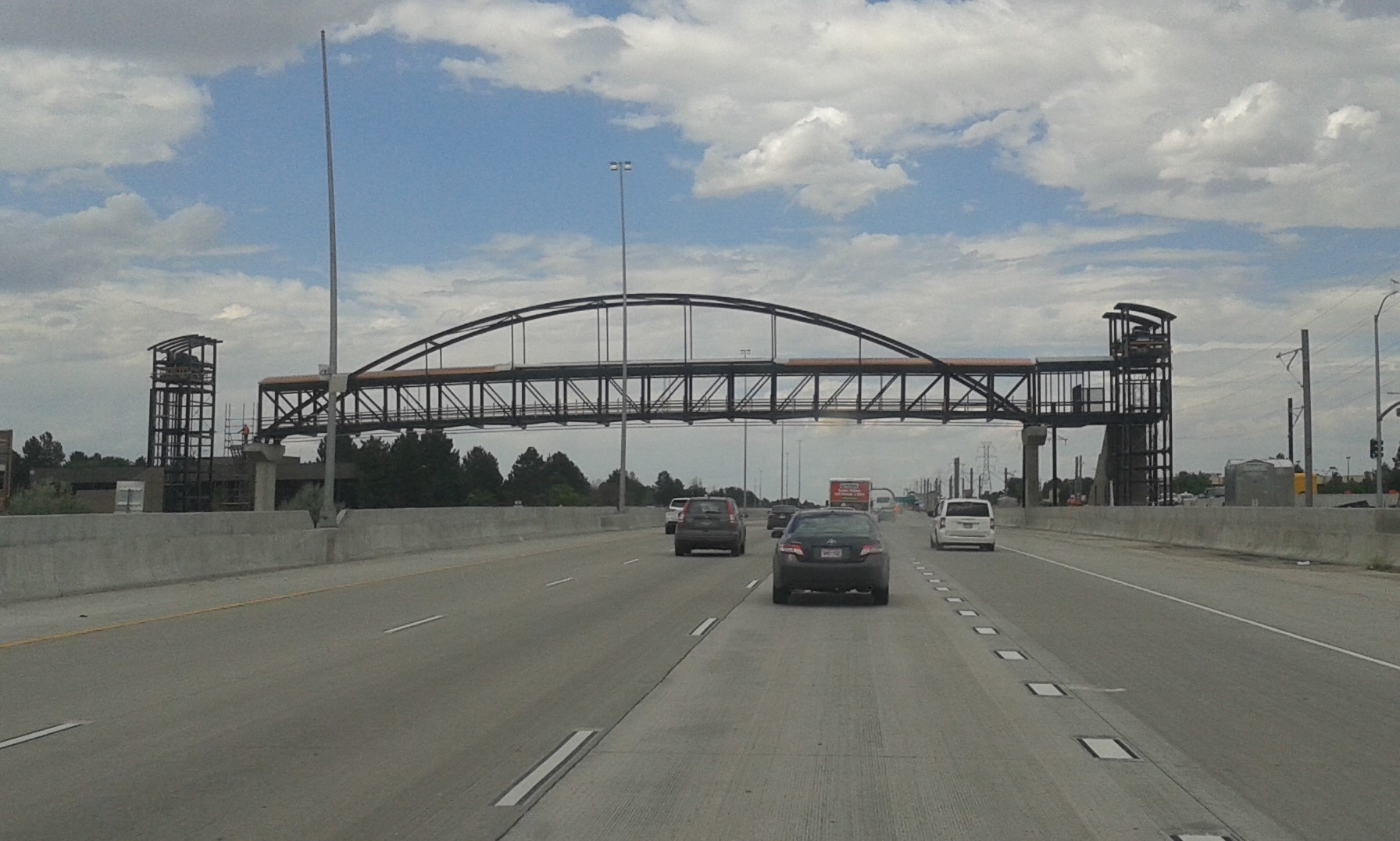
I-225 passing under the Florida station pedestrian bridge while running through Aurora

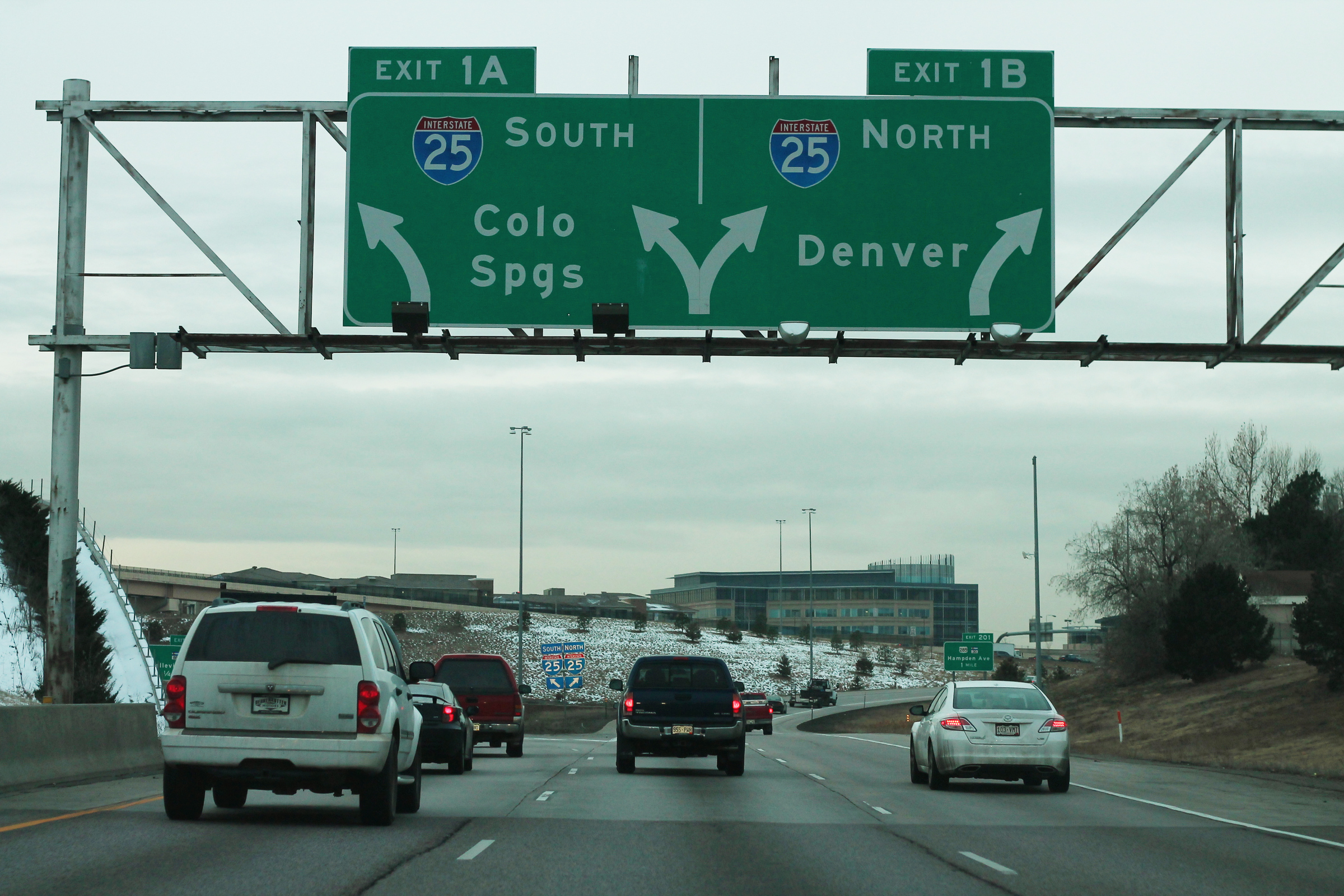
The southern end of I-225 leading to I-25.

I-225 is one of the three freeways that serves Aurora and is the only existing Interstate in Colorado that never runs concurrent with another highway in its entire length. The southern end of I-225 begins at an interchange with I-25, as a typical four-lane Interstate with a 65-mile-per-hour (105 km/h) limit. The road heads northeastward through southern Denver, and, after having exits with DTC Boulevard and Yosemite Street in Greenwood Village, the road becomes six lanes with an auxiliary lane in each direction, traversing the Denver–Greenwood Village city limits. With Cherry Creek State Park and Cherry Creek Reservoir on its eastside, the highway interchanges with SH 83 at the northern boundary of the park. Following the exit at SH 83, the freeway enters Aurora, where it turns northward, maintaining six throughlanes and auxiliary lanes at each exit, a 65-mile-per-hour (105 km/h) speed limit to its northern terminus at I-70, and has upgraded exits at Iliff Avenue, Mississippi Avenue, Alameda Avenue, and 6th Avenue (also signed as SH 30). After crossing Sand Creek, the freeway interchanges with Colfax Avenue (also signed as US 40, US 287, and I-70 Bus.), and then with 17th Place (serving the Anschutz Medical Campus). After the exit, I-225 enters Adams County, continuing through the city of Aurora. The route then crosses a Union Pacific Railroad line and the RTD A Line and continues north, where it interchanges with I-70. The northbound ramp to westbound I-70 reenters Denver, and the eastbound I-70 to southbound I-225 ramp originates in Denver but enters Aurora as it passes under westbound I-70 to southbound I-225 ramp.

Like other state highways in Colorado, I-225 is maintained by the Colorado Department of Transportation (CDOT), an agency who is responsible for maintaining and constructing transportation infrastructure across Colorado. In 2014, the department's traffic surveys showed that I-225 serves approximately 71,500 vehicles per day between I-25 and Parker Road and 60,750 vehicles north of Parker Road going in and out of Aurora. All of I-225 is part of the National Highway System (NHS), a network of roads important to the country's economy, defense, and mobility.

== History ==
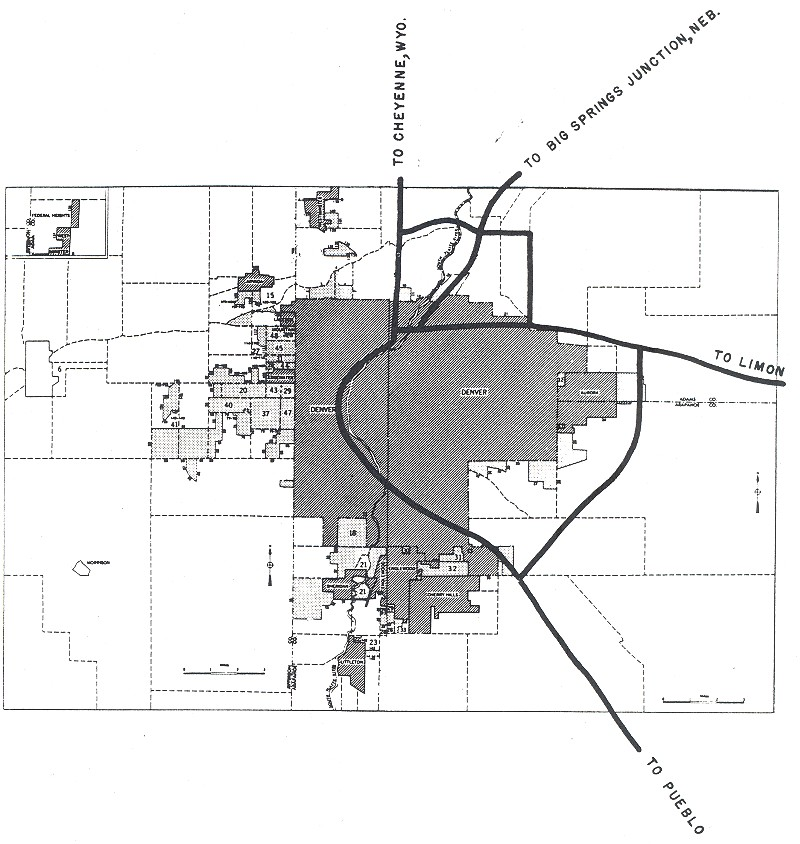
1955 map showing planned Interstate Highways around Denver

I-225 was originally proposed by CDOT to be numbered as I-25E on April 3, 1958, based upon the Route Numbering Committee signing north, south, east, and west routes as suffixed routes in the Interstate Highway System. AASHTO rejected the designation, and the highway was then assigned the I-225 designation following further correspondence the following year.

=== Construction and expansion ===
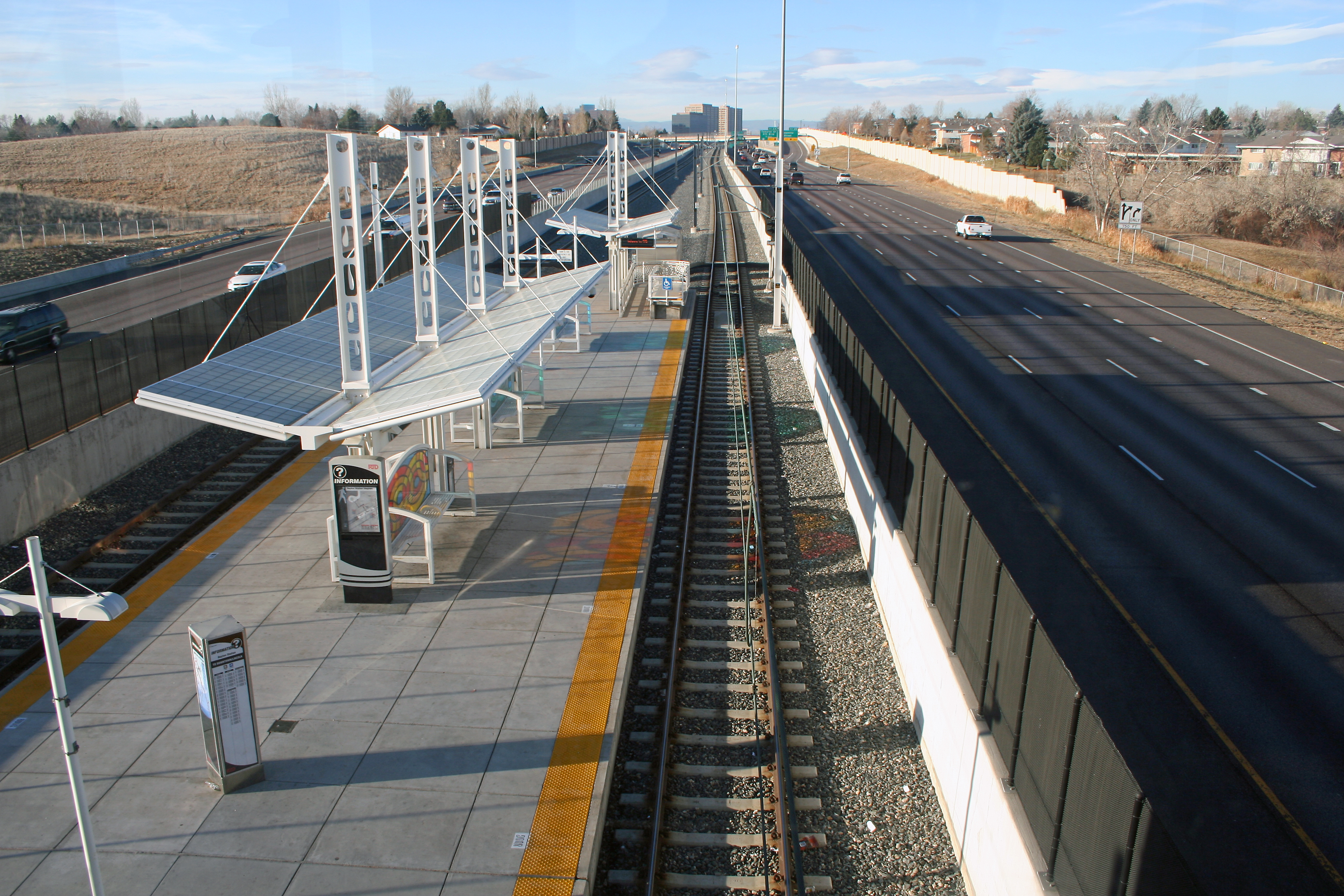
The Dayton RTD station in Aurora is located in the center of I-225.

Construction on I-225 began in May 1964 at I-70. A section from Colfax Avenue to Sixth Avenue was opened in 1966. The first segment of freeway that ran from sixth Avenue to I-70 received a temporary carrier route that was cosigning I-225 as State Highway 33. CDOT then removed the state highway designation in 1968 as part of an effort to remove carrier routes on existing US and Interstate highways. Five years later, a segment between Mississippi Avenue and Parker Road was opened, and construction began on another segment south of Parker Road, completed in May 1975. The rest of the route between Yosemite Street and I-25 was completed in May 1976. Immediately after the completion of the freeway, improvements at the SH 30 (6th Avenue) interchange were underway involving the overpass. Reconstruction of the freeway between 30th Avenue and Smith Road took place between October 1992 to August 1994, which involved bridge replacements over Toll Gate Creek and Smith Road that were completed by August 1990 in an effort for the reconstruction project. Two months after the reconstruction project, the I-70/I-225 interchange reconstruction went underway, which involved widening I-225 from I-70 to Smith Road and improvements to the flyover ramps at the interchange that was completed in April 1995. From February 1996 to November 1997, I-225 was expanded to six lanes between Toll Gate Creek and Colfax Avenue and between Colfax and 6th Avenue by December 1997. A new interchange at Alameda Avenue was completed and opened in 2002 and a new flyover ramp at Parker Road began in September 2000 to complete the interchange between Parker Road and I-225. Another interchange at 17th Place was added and opened on February 15, 2013. The portion from I-25 to SH 83/Parker Road was rebuilt as part of the T-REX Project completed in 2006. The highway was later widened between Parker Road and Mississippi Avenue to six lanes, as part of a project to widen the entire freeway to I-70; construction on this portion took place between May 2012 and November 2014. The RTD R Line, a light rail line, follows the entire length of I-225 from I-25 to near I-70. Its tracks run parallel to the freeway and also use its median and is interlined with a portion of the RTD H Line. The light rail project was approved in 2004 as part of the FasTracks program, began construction in 2012, and was completed in February 2017.

== Exit list ==
County	Location	mi	km	Exit	Destinations	Notes
City and County of Denver		0.00	0.00	1A-B	I-25 (US 87) – Colorado Springs, Denver	I-25 exit 200; signed as left exit 1A (south) & 1B (north); directional T interchange.
Arapahoe	Greenwood Village	0.673	1.083	2A	DTC Boulevard / Tamarac Street	Signed as exit 2 northbound
Arapahoe	Greenwood Village	1.333	2.145	2B	Yosemite Street	Southbound exit and northbound entrance
Arapahoe	Aurora	3.946	6.350	4	SH 83 (Parker Road) – Cherry Creek State Park	
Arapahoe	Aurora	5.373	8.647	5	Iliff Avenue	Partial cloverleaf interchange
Arapahoe	Aurora	6.886	11.082	7	Mississippi Avenue	
Arapahoe	Aurora	7.921	12.748	8	Alameda Avenue – Community College of Aurora	Offset single-point urban interchange
Arapahoe	Aurora	8.953	14.408	9	SH 30 (6th Avenue) – Buckley Space Force Base	
Adams	Aurora	9.901	15.934	10A	I-70 BL / US 40 / US 287 (Colfax Avenue) – Anschutz Medical Campus	Signed as exit 10 southbound
Adams	Aurora	10.151	16.336	10B	17th Place	Southbound exit is via exit 10. Opened on February 15, 2013.
Adams–Denver county line	Aurora–Denver line	11.997	19.307	12A-B	I-70 west (US 36) – Denver I-70 east (US 36) – Limon, Denver International Airport	I-70 exit 282; signed as left exit 12A (west) & 12B (east); directional T interchange; access to Denver International Airport
1.000 mi = 1.609 km; 1.000 km = 0.621 mi: Incomplete access
