= Regional Transportation District =

Public transport agency in Denver, Colorado

- Map of the RTD rail system

Overview
- Locale: Denver metro area, Colorado
- Transit type: Bus; Commuter rail; Light rail
- Number of lines: 102 (bus); 4 (commuter rail); 6 (light rail)
- Number of stations: 57 (light rail); 27 (commuter rail)
- Daily ridership: 37,800 (commuter rail, weekdays, Q2 2026); 42,300 (light rail, weekdays, Q2 2026); 177,700 (bus, weekdays, Q2 2026)
- Annual ridership: 8,644,700 (commuter rail, 2025); 10,568,000 (light rail, 2025); 44,050,100 (bus, 2025)
- Chief executive: Debra A. Johnson
- Headquarters: 1660 Blake Street; Denver, Colorado
- Website: rtd-denver.com

Operation
- Began operation: 1974
- Reporting marks: RTDC, RTDZ
- Number of vehicles: 1,028 (bus); 267 (rail)

Technical
- System length: 114.2 mi (183.8 km) (rail); 60.1 mi (96.7 km) (light rail); 54.1 mi (87.1 km) (commuter rail)

The Regional Transportation District (RTD) is the public transit agency for Denver and its metropolitan area in the U.S. state of Colorado. It operates a large bus and rail system that comprises 10 rail lines—both light rail and commuter rail—and 102 bus routes. RTD's rail system consists of 6 light rail lines and an additional 4 commuter rail lines with 84 stations and 114.2 miles (183.8 km) of track. The bus network consists of 85 local routes, 12 regional routes, 10 limited routes, and 5 express routes to Denver International Airport. In 2025, the entire system had a ridership of 64,192,300, or about 261,300 per weekday as of the second quarter of 2026, making RTD the largest transit agency in the Mountain states by both ridership and the number of routes.

RTD serves a 2,349-square-mile (6,080 km^{2}) area with a total of 3.09 million people in 40 municipalities and 8 counties. The agency was organized in 1969 and is governed by a 15-member board of directors that is elected from districts within the service area. RTD has a budget of $1.5 billion for fiscal year 2026 with a majority of its revenue derived from a 1 percent sales tax. The agency has a fleet of 955 fully accessible buses; some of the buses are operated by private carriers under contract with RTD. The rail system comprises 267 railcars, including 201 high-floor light rail vehicles.

Several existing bus operators were acquired and consolidated into RTD to form the initial bus system, later named "The Ride", that debuted on April 12, 1974. A personal rapid transit system had been studied but was scrapped in favor of a conventional light rail system, which was approved by voters in 1987. The first section of the light rail system opened on October 8, 1994, between Downtown Denver and I-25 & Broadway station. The FasTracks transit plan was approved in 2004 and funded the rapid expansion of the RTD system to encompass 122 miles (196 km) of new commuter rail and light rail, 18 miles (29 km) of bus rapid transit (BRT) service, and enhanced bus service.

== History ==
=== Bus ===
Bus service in Denver dates back to 1924, when Denver Tramway began the first bus between Englewood and Fort Logan. Buses had completely replaced the previously expansive streetcar system in metro Denver by 1950, and the privately owned Denver Tramway served the City and County of Denver, as well as older portions of Arvada, Aurora, Englewood, Golden, Lakewood, Westminster, and Wheat Ridge and smaller suburbs. In 1969, the Colorado General Assembly created the RTD to provide public transportation to five additional counties in the metropolitan area.

Denver Tramway Company continued its service under sponsorship of the City and County of Denver until April 18, 1971, when it was taken over by Denver Metro Transit, an entity created by the City and County of Denver. Suburban services only continued for those suburbs willing to contribute a subsidy. It acquired privately owned companies, improved service frequency, and expanded to routes that commercial carriers previously operated such as airport buses.

By 1972, RTD had created a plan for a personal rapid transit (PRT) system in the area, which included 100 miles (160 km) of elevated PRT and extensive bus service throughout the areas served by RTD. The PRT system would have 58 stations and a fleet of 800 electric vehicles that could each carry 12 passengers and travel at up to 40 miles per hour (64 km/h). Later that year, the Urban Mass Transportation Administration (UMTA) selected RTD to develop PRT as a demonstration project. In 1973, residents voted for a sales tax of 0.5% over the six counties served by RTD for ten years; 20% of the funds would be used for expanded bus services and the other 80% was earmarked for PRT construction, although that project was later scrapped. The tax became effective January 1, 1974, and was raised to 0.6% on May 1, 1983. On January 1, 2005, the tax rate increased to 1.0%.

In 1973, RTD started operating a demonstration bus service, the Parker Stage, between Downtown Denver and the suburb of Parker.

In February 1974, RTD began operating express services between Denver and various points in the metropolitan area, using 25 buses the agency had leased the previous month. RTD later acquired and consolidated the local bus systems. Evergreen Transit, which primarily ran commuter bus service between Evergreen and Denver, was the first, and RTD started running service on April 12, 1974. Denver Metro Transit became part of RTD in July 1974. RTD acquired the bus system in Boulder from the Public Service Company of Colorado. Other RTD acquisitions included Longmont Mini, the Englewood-Littleton-Ft. Logan service, Public Service and Northglenn Suburban Service. RTD also acquired the privately owned Denver-Boulder Bus Company, which ran airport buses.

RTD expanded and improved service frequency in the mid-1970s, and its services were expanded to routes that commercial carriers previously operated, although inflation prompted RTD to implement a new fare structure in February 1978. On September 11, 1978, RTD completely replaced all bus routes, formerly mostly radials from downtown Denver following old streetcar routes, with new routes based on a grid system, numbered based on the hundred blocks of the street grid. For instance, the new Colorado Blvd (4000 east block) route was numbered 40, and the new 10th Avenue (1000 north block) route was numbered 10. RTD reached a record number of weekday passengers in 1980, the same year it expanded the Park-n-Ride system and acquired 216 new buses, 89 of which were articulated. RTD also made its service more accessible to elderly and handicapped people.

In 1979, federal approval was granted for the 16th Street Mall in downtown Denver, originally known as Transitway. The project allowed express bus productivity to double and was eventually intersected by RTD's first light rail line, the D Line, at Stout and California streets. Construction began in 1980.

State law required privatization of 20% of bus lines in 1989, with this quota increased to 35% in 2002. In September 1994 Downtown Express/High Occupancy Vehicle (HOV) lanes were opened to buses, and to carpools a year later.

RTD's Market Street Station closed on May 11 and 12, 2014 and was replaced by the newer Union Station. The Free MetroRide service began along 18th and 19th streets between Union Station and Civic Center Station.

=== Light rail ===
RTD began planning for a light rail in the mid-1980s, after the successful opening of the San Diego Trolley in 1981 and amid a surge in light rail construction in mid-sized cities nationwide (Buffalo, Portland, Sacramento, and San Jose also built systems at the same time).

RTD's first line, the 5.3-mile (8.5 km) Central Corridor between the 30th & Downing and the I-25 & Broadway stations (now part of the D Line and L Line) opened on Friday, October 7, 1994. It operated with free service for that first weekend, with revenue service starting on October 10. More than 200,000 passengers rode the new system during its opening weekend, when the fleet comprised only 11 Siemens SD-100 rail cars.

The 8.7-mile (14.0 km) Southwest Corridor light rail extension to Mineral Avenue in Littleton opened in July 2000, followed by the 1.8-mile (2.9 km) Central Platte Valley spur to Denver Union Station in April 2002. In 2003, the downtown portion of the original line between Speer Boulevard and 14th Street was realigned as a result of construction of the Colorado Convention Center.

In April 2006, transit workers of the Amalgamated Transit Union went on strike for the first time in 24 years, citing increased health care costs, mandatory overtime, and disproportionate wage increases relative to upper management. Workers walked off on April 3, shutting down the light rail system and decreasing bus service to about 45% of its normal capacity. A revised contract was approved by the union on April 7, and service resumed on April 10. The strike lasted seven days, and although thousands of commuters were stranded by the strike, only a few backups were reported as customers made makeshift arrangements for commuting or waited out the strike.

The 19-mile (31 km) Southeast Corridor, a component of the Transportation Expansion Project, opened on November 17, 2006, along I-25 to Lone Tree and a branch along I-225 to Parker Road. The W Line (originally the West Rail Line) opened on April 26, 2013. By April 2013, the system had expanded to 170 light rail vehicles, serving 47 miles (76 km) of track.

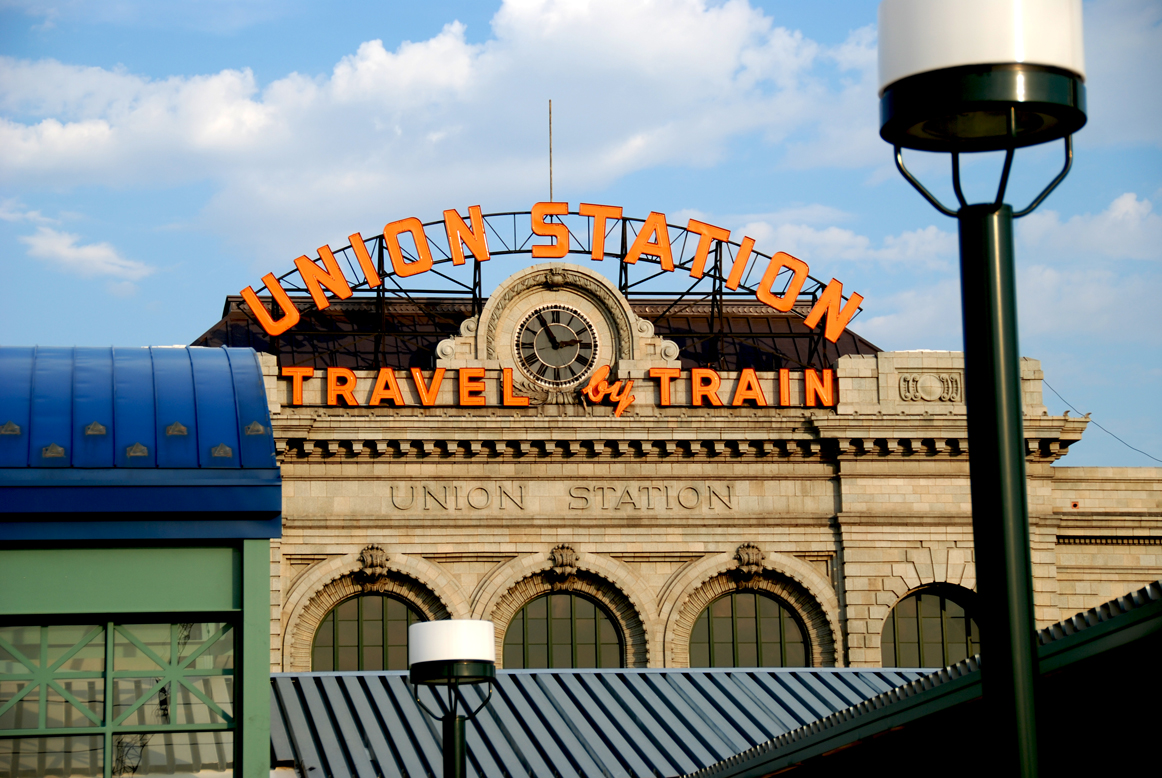
Union Station is the main interchange between the commuter rail and light rail systems; local, regional, intercity bus lines; and Amtrak.

The light rail R Line to Aurora and Lone Tree opened on February 24, 2017.

RTD made significant service changes and suspended service on multiple bus and light rail lines due to the COVID-19 pandemic. The F Line was suspended on September 20, 2020, and the C Line was suspended on January 10, 2021, with both routes being permanently discontinued in January 2023.

=== Commuter rail ===
With the voter approval of FasTracks in 2004, RTD began planning for a series of commuter rail lines. The first 23.5 miles (37.82 km) of which, the A Line servicing Denver International Airport, opened on April 22, 2016. The second, the first 6.2 mile segment of the B Line, officially opened on July 25, 2016.

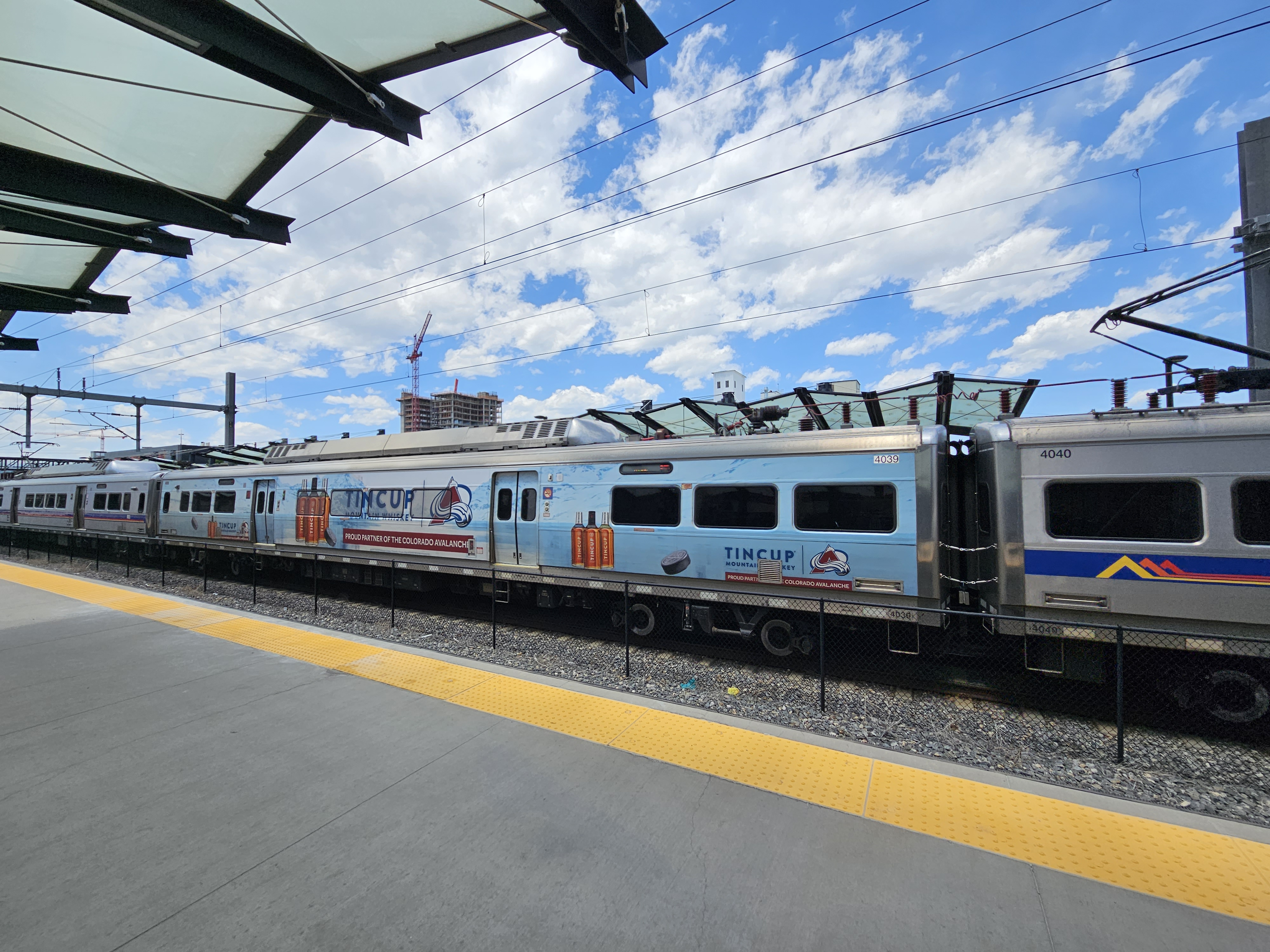
A commuter rail car at 38th & Blake station

As one of the first new commuter rail systems in the country planned after enactment of the Rail Safety Improvement Act of 2008, positive train control (PTC) and vehicle monitoring system technologies are implemented along the system's commuter train lines. After the A Line opened between Denver Union Station and Denver International Airport, it experienced a series of issues related to having to adjust the length of unpowered gaps between different overhead power sections, direct lightning strikes, snagging wires, and crossing signals behaving unexpectedly. In response, Denver Transit Partners, the contractor building and operating the A Line, stationed crossing guards at each place where the A line crosses local streets at grade while it continued to explore software revisions and other fixes to address the underlying issues. The Federal Railroad Administration allowed RTD to open its B Line as originally scheduled on July 25, 2016, because the B Line only has one at-grade crossing along its current route that is not designated to be a quiet zone. However, FRA previously halted testing on the longer G Line to Wheat Ridge – originally scheduled to open in late 2016 – until more progress could be shown resolving the A Line crossing issues. On April 26, 2019, the G Line opened to the public.

=== Bus rapid transit ===
In January 2016, RTD opened the first branded BRT line in the Denver metropolitan area, the Flatiron Flyer. It travels along the U.S. Route 36 corridor between Boulder and Denver, with some service continuing to Aurora, and uses freeway stations for faster access. The Flatiron Flyer expanded to seven routes, but two were suspended during the COVID-19 pandemic and not subsequently restored. A feasibility study into further BRT expansion was completed in 2019 by RTD and recommended the construction of eight corridors by 2050.

The Colfax Avenue corridor in Denver was chosen for a new BRT system, named LYNX, and began construction in October 2024 under the Denver Department of Transportation and Infrastructure. The BRT line will have 28 stations and covers 8.6 miles (13.8 km) of the corridor between Union Station and Colfax station in Aurora near Interstate 225. A 5.5-mile (8.9 km) within Denver uses center-running bus lanes, while other sections are in mixed traffic. LYNX is planned to enter service by the end of 2027 with service every four minutes during weekdays, seven minutes on weekdays, and fifteen minutes at night. The Colorado Department of Transportation has its own BRT program that plans to construct lines on Colorado Boulevard and Federal Boulevard—both state highways.

=== Accidents and incidents ===
On January 28, 2019, an R Line light rail train derailed the junction of East Exposition Avenue and South Sable Boulevard (between Aurora Metro Center and Florida stations) due to excessive speed. The curve has a speed limit of 10 mph (16 km/h) but the train approached at 38 mph (61 km/h). One woman's foot was amputated by the train wheels after she was ejected from the car during the accident, eight other passengers were also injured. Although determined responsible for the accident, no charges were filed against the driver.

On September 21, 2022, another derailment occurred at the same location. Three people were taken to hospital with injuries that were not believed to be life-threatening. Video showed the train approaching the turn at high speed. According to an investigation conducted by RTD and overseen by the Colorado Public Utilities Commission, the crash was caused by excessive speed and operator error. The exact speed was not specified, nor was it detailed whether the driver was disciplined for the accident.

== Services ==
The primary RTD services are scheduled bus and rail routes that serve an average of over 135,000 daily passengers on weekdays. The agency has 112 bus routes that are divided into 85 local routes, 12 regional routes, 10 limited routes, and 5 SkyRide routes. These routes serve 9,720 total bus stops within the RTD service area, which covers 2,345 square miles (6,070 km^{2}).

Rail services are divided into two fare zones: local and airport. Local and regional service is within the local zone. The airport zone applies for bus or rail travel into and out of Denver International Airport.

=== Rail services ===
RTD has four commuter rail lines that operate on clock-face schedules with all day and bi-directional service. These lines also have frequencies of 60 minutes or less, making the network more similar to "regional rail", such as SEPTA Regional Rail in Philadelphia.

RTD commuter rail lines
Line	Opened	Length	Stations	Termini	
A Line (RTD)	April 22, 2016	23.5 mi (37.8 km)	8	Union Station	Denver Airport
B Line (RTD)	July 25, 2016	6.2 mi (10.0 km)	4	Union Station	Westminster
G Line (RTD)	April 26, 2019	11.2 mi (18.0 km)	8	Union Station	Wheat Ridge/Ward
N Line (RTD)	September 21, 2020	13 mi (21 km)	7	Union Station	Eastlake/124th

As of September 2026, the RTD light rail system comprises five active lines. Two lines are suspended due to a long-term reconstruction of tracks in downtown Denver; a temporary line, the "T Line", is operating along the Southeast Corridor to replace frequency lost by the suspension of the H Line. Another rail line, the D Line, was eliminated in September 2026 after it had been suspended for the construction project.

RTD light rail lines
Line	Opened	Stations	Termini		Status
C Line (RTD)	June 7, 2026 (restored)	12	Union Station	Littleton–Mineral	Active
E Line (RTD)	November 17, 2006	21	Union Station	RidgeGate Parkway	Active
H Line (RTD)	November 17, 2006	16	18th & California	Florida	Suspended
L Line (RTD)	January 14, 2018	6	16th & California	30th & Downing	Suspended
R Line (RTD)	February 24, 2017	16	Peoria	RidgeGate Parkway	Modified
T Line (RTD)	June 7, 2026	12	Alameda	Lincoln	Temporary
W Line (RTD)	April 26, 2013	15	Union Station	Jefferson County Government Center–Golden	Active

=== Special services ===
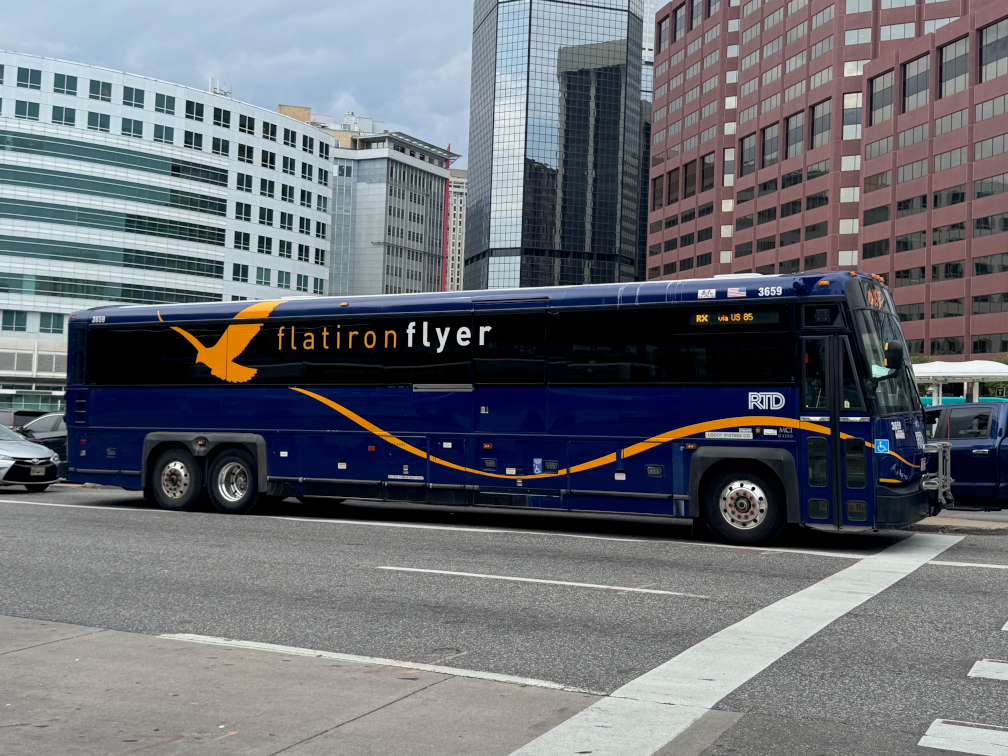
MCI D4500CT coach bus used for the Flatiron Flyer.

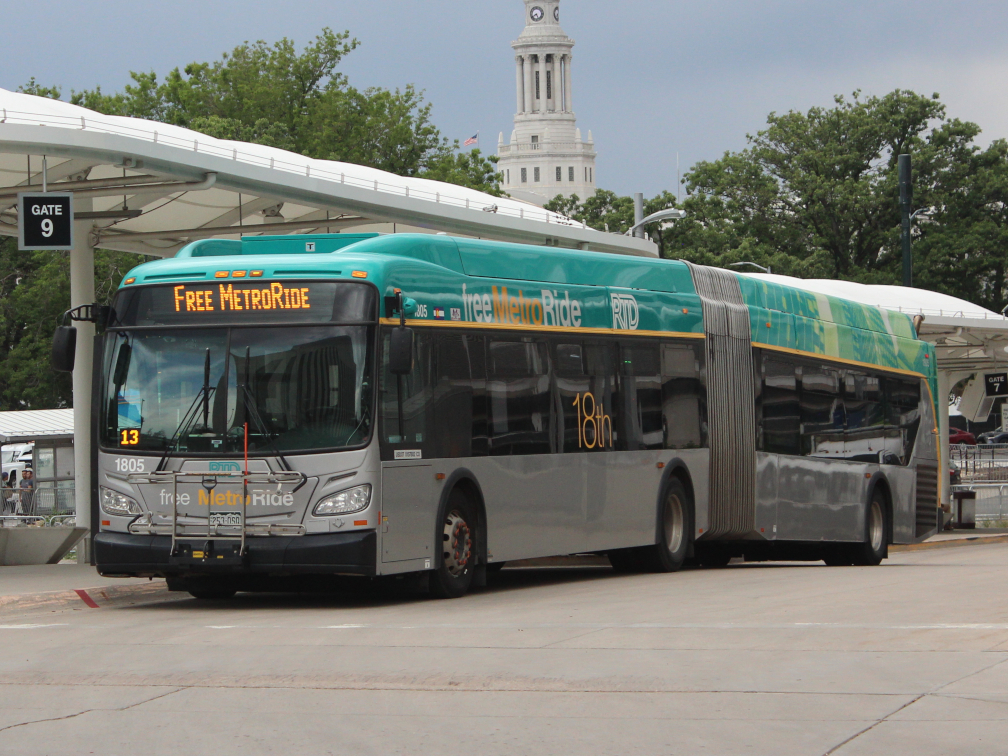
New Flyer XD60 articulated bus used for the Free MetroRide.

Special bus services are offered for various purposes.

- Access-a-Ride: Paratransit service providing local bus transportation in the Denver metro area for people with disabilities and cannot access the fixed-route bus and train system
- FlexRide: On-demand shuttle service connecting less densely populated areas without fixed-route bus and rail service to nearby transportation hubs
- Flatiron Flyer: Express bus service between Boulder and various locations in Denver
- 16th Street FreeRide: A free shuttle bus service that runs the length of the 16th Street Mall, connecting three major RTD transportation hubs (Union Station, California/Stout station, and Civic Center Station)
- Free MetroRide: A free shuttle bus service that runs parallel to the MallRide on 18th and 19th Streets, but operates faster by making fewer stops between Union Station and Civic Center Station. This service was suspended on September 29, 2024, but was resumed on May 27, 2025.
- SeniorRide: Point-to-point shuttles for groups of 10 or more seniors, and scheduled service between shopping centers and senior housing complexes/community centers
- SkyRide: Airport shuttle/express bus service for travelers heading to Denver International Airport

RTD also operated special routes for sporting events until cuts in the early 2020s following the COVID-19 pandemic. The "BroncosRide", which provided direct service to Broncos Stadium at Mile High from various locations around the metro area, was suspended in 2020 and permanently discontinued in 2023. Similar services were offered for some Colorado Rockies in Denver and University of Colorado football games in Boulder. The "RunRide" operated for the annual Bolder Boulder 10K road race from 1995 to 2022, carrying 13,000 passengers in some years.

== Stations ==
=== Bus stations ===
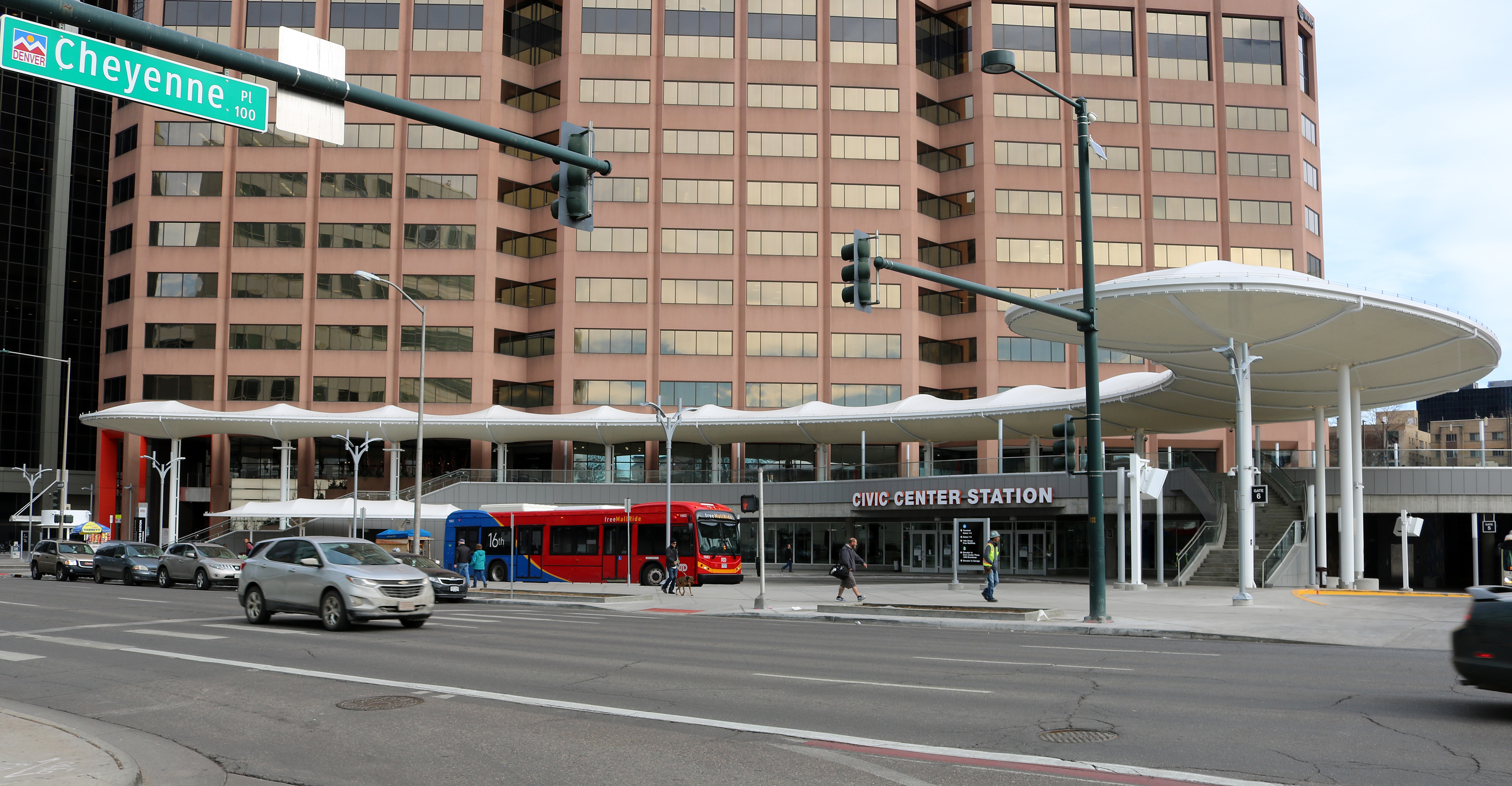
Civic Center Station after renovation in 2017

Major bus stations provide termini for express and regional routes. Many local and limited routes stop near these stations, making transfers between routes relatively easy. Of the three major bus stations in the RTD system, only one—Union Station—is also served directly by light rail trains. None of the three major bus stations is a Park 'n' Ride facility. Civic Center Station is connected to Union Station via the Free MallRide and Free MetroRide shuttle services.

Station Name	Address
Civic Center Station	1550 Broadway, Denver
Union Station (rail and bus)	1701 Wynkoop Street, Denver
Downtown Boulder Station	1400 Walnut Street, Boulder

=== Rail stations ===
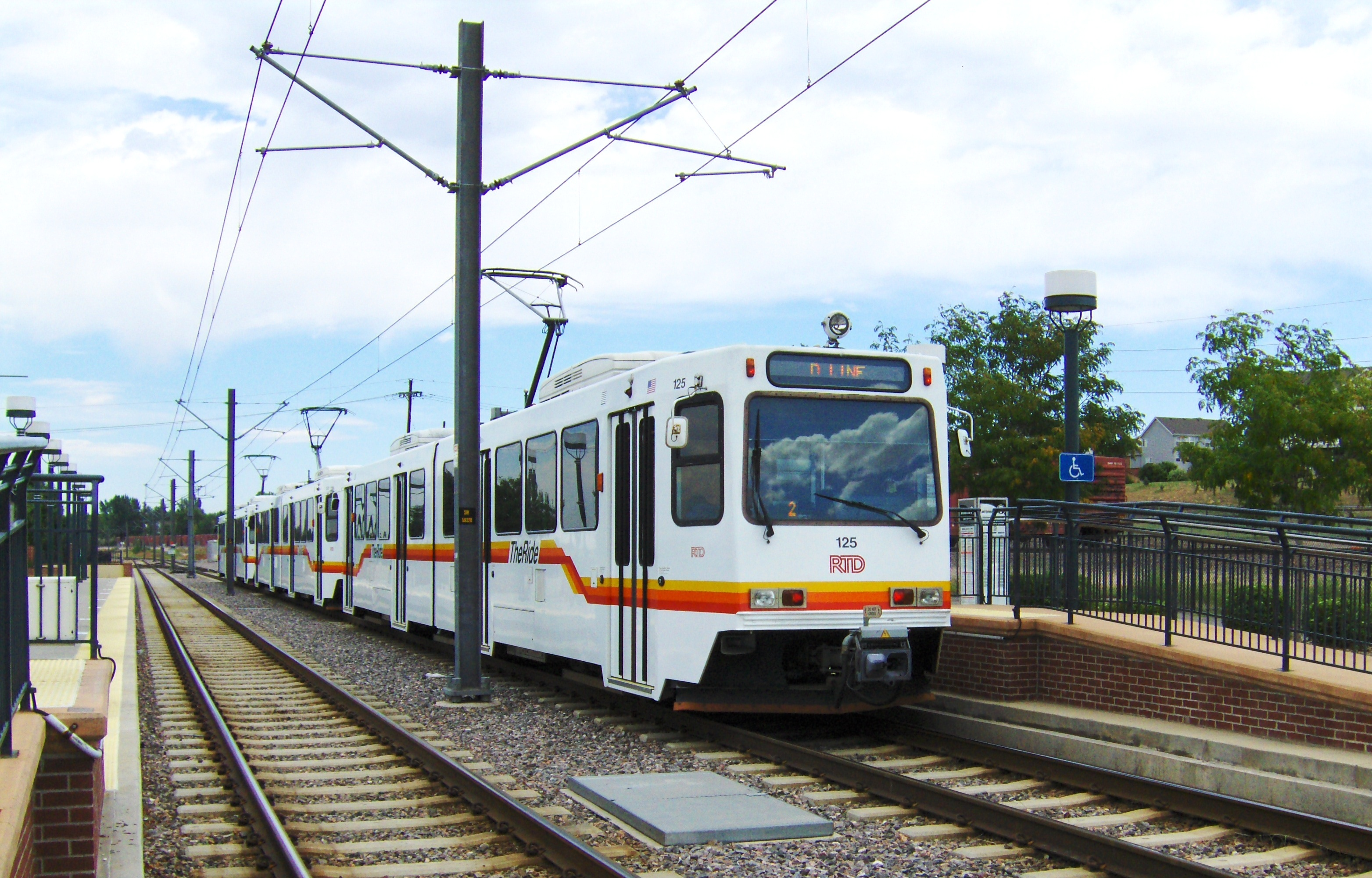
Littleton-Mineral light rail station

RTD has 57 total light rail and 27 total commuter rail stations that are served by its 10 rail lines, which span 114.2 miles (183.8 km). Many of the Light Rail and Commuter Rail stations have gates for various bus services. RTD has adopted specific design standards that are incorporated into its station design, with a specific emphasis on the platform, its transition plaza and the multi-modal access provided at the facility. Platforms are designed to accommodate three or four car Light Rail trains in addition to two-car or four-car Commuter Rail trains and may be in either a side, island or side center style. The transition plaza is the area where tickets are purchased and passenger services can be found. Additionally, all stations include works of public art as part of RTD's art-n-Transit program. These works include independent works or as pieces incorporated into the canopies, columns, pavers, windscreens, fencing and landscaping present at all stations.

=== Park-n-Rides ===
A number of rail stations in the RTD system, as well as a number of bus stops located away from the three major bus stations, are attached to dedicated RTD parking facilities. These are the Park-n-Ride locations. There are 92 RTD Park-n-Ride facilities with an aggregate total of more than 30,000 parking spaces.

== Fares ==
Since the start of 2024, the standard fare for a 3-hour pass aboard buses or rail costs $2.75, and travel on bus or rail to Denver International Airport costs $10. Seniors, students, people with disabilities, and Medicare recipients are eligible for reduced fares. All Youth aged 19 and younger ride for free. RTD also offers daily passes: Local ($5.50) and Regional/Airport ($10) which allow unlimited travel at the chosen fare level until 2:59 a.m. the day following the purchase.

The fare system was last updated in January 2024, after conducting a fare study from April 2022 to July 2023. Users mentioned that fares were expensive to begin with, and the zone system made understanding fares complicated. The changes resulted in a simplification of the fare structure of the system, as well as lower costs. Prior to this update, the rail system was divided into local, regional, and airport zones, costing $3.00, $5.25, and $10.50 respectively.

A fare card program, in development for over four years by Xerox, is available through employers as the EcoPass, through colleges as the CollegePass, and to the general public as the MyRide Stored Value card. MyRide users receive a discount on fares.

RTD enforces transit code and fares with its own transit police, as well as via contracts with local police departments and Allied Universal Security Service.

The A, B, G, and N commuter lines require a crew member on each run. This member is responsible for enforcing fares and security. The light rail lines (D, E, H, L, R, and W) do not require such a member, and fares are enforced through random inspection.

== Administration ==
The Regional Transportation District is a special district created by the State of Colorado and is independent of other governments. It covers a 2,345-square-mile (6,070 km^{2}) area with a total of 3.09 million people in 40 municipalities and 8 counties. The agency is governed by a board of directors with 15 members who are elected to represent areas within the district. As of 2026, RTD has 3,457 total employees who are organized into nine departments and other offices. The chief executive officer (CEO) is Debra A. Johnson. The 2026 budget was $1.28 billion; most of the agency's revenue is derived from a regional 1 percent sales tax. RTD has an exemption to the Taxpayer Bill of Rights, adopted by Colorado voters in 1992, to allow for full revenue generation. The sales tax rate was raised from 0.6 percent to 1 percent after approval from voters in November 2004.

=== Board of Directors ===
RTD is governed by a 15-member, publicly elected Board of Directors. Directors are elected to four-year terms and represent specific districts, each comprising approximately 200,000 constituents. The Colorado General Assembly passed a bill in 2026 to restructure the RTD Board of Directors in 2029; the board will be reduced to nine members, of which five seats are elected from districts and four are appointed by the state government.

As of 2026, the RTD Board of Directors includes the following members:

Title	Name	District
Chair	Patrick O’Keefe	District H
First Vice Chair	Ian Harwick	District L
Second Vice Chair	Chris Gutschenritter	District D
Secretary	Chris Nicholson	District A
Treasurer	Karen Benker	District I
Director	JoyAnn Ruscha	District B
Director	Michael Guzman	District C
Director	Julien Bouquet	District G
Director	Matt Larsen	District E
Director	Kathleen Chandler	District F
Director	Vince Buzek	District J
Director	Troy L. Whitmore	District K
Director	Brett Paglieri	District M
Director	Cindy Arcuri	District N
Director	Lynn Guissinger	District O

== Fleet ==
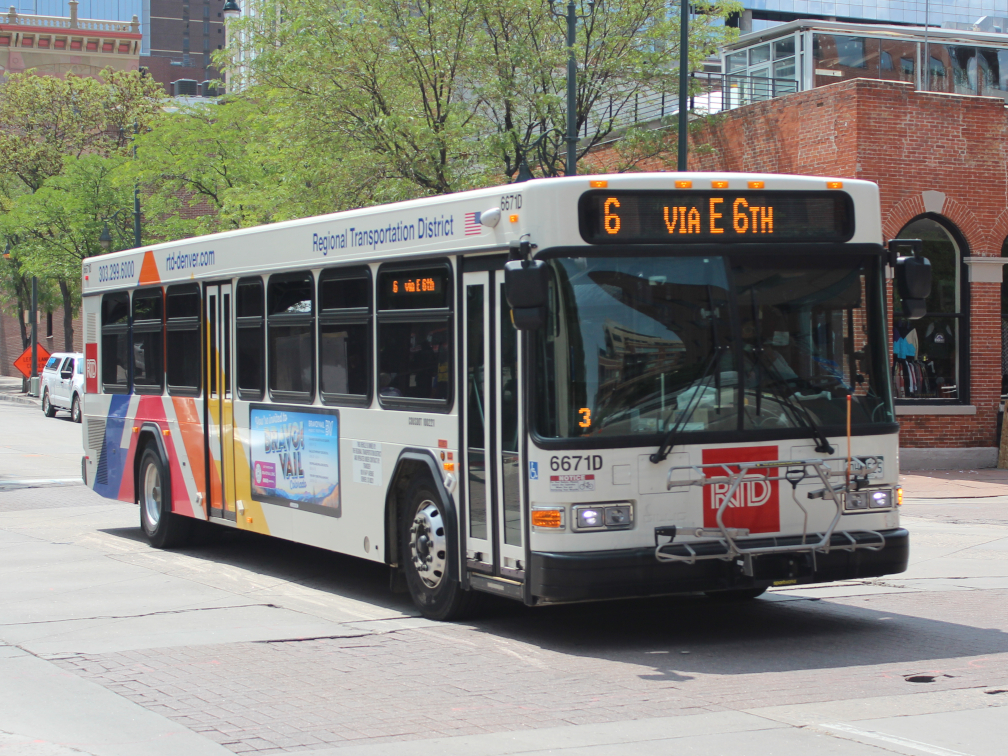
RTD 2023 Gillig Low Floor bus

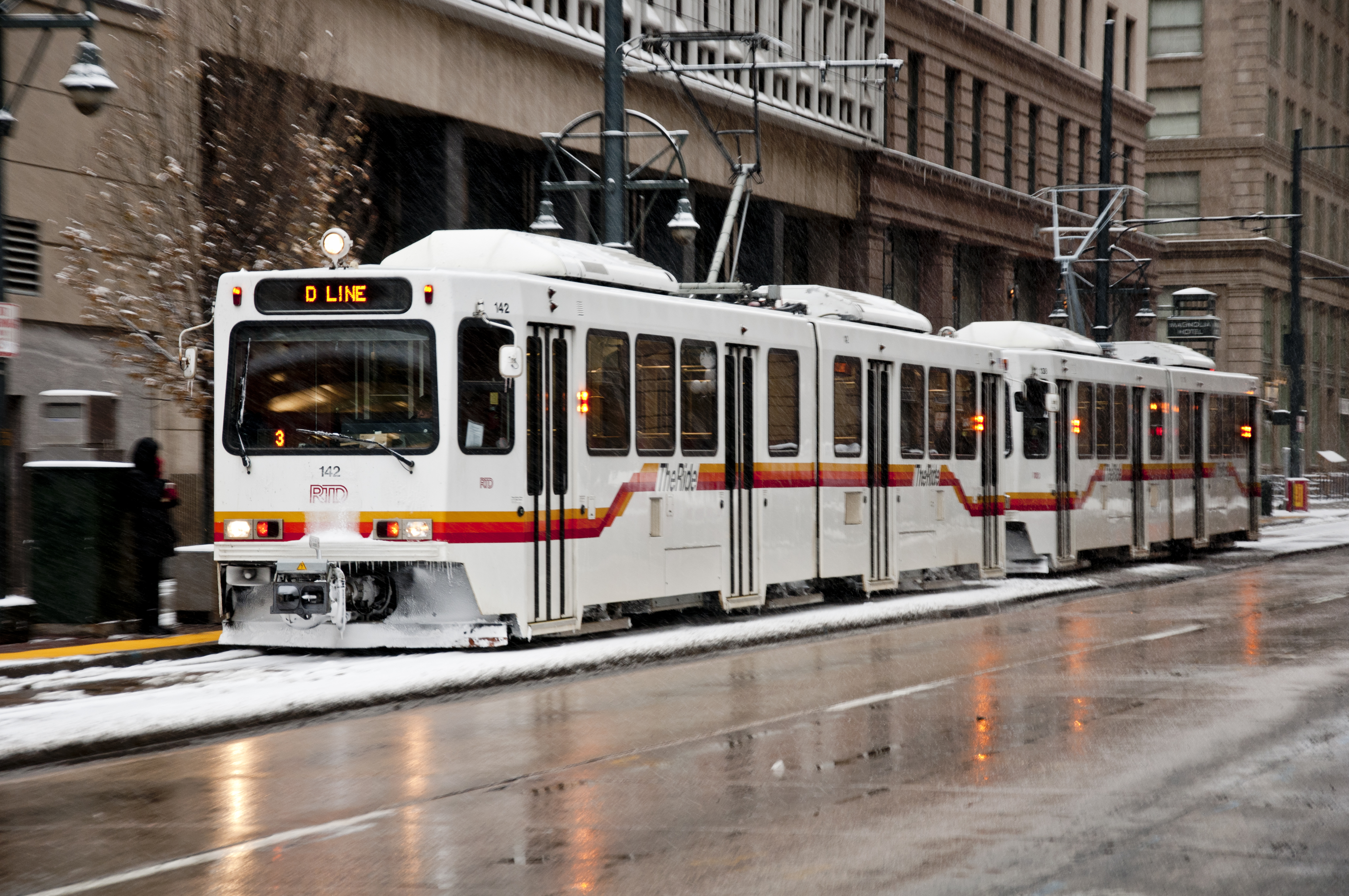
RTD D Line – Mineral Station/18th and California train in downtown Denver

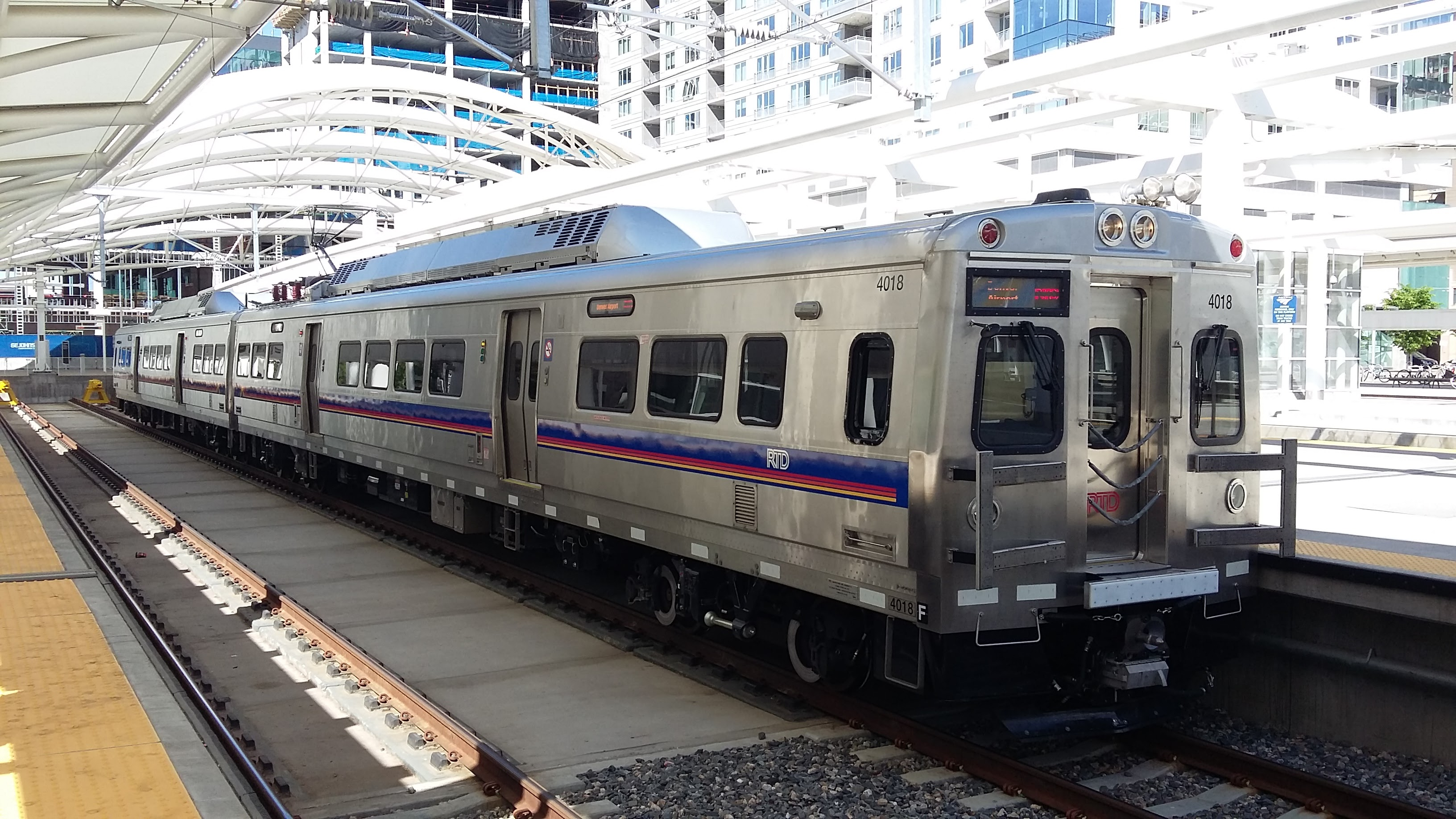
RTD A Line train at Denver Union Station

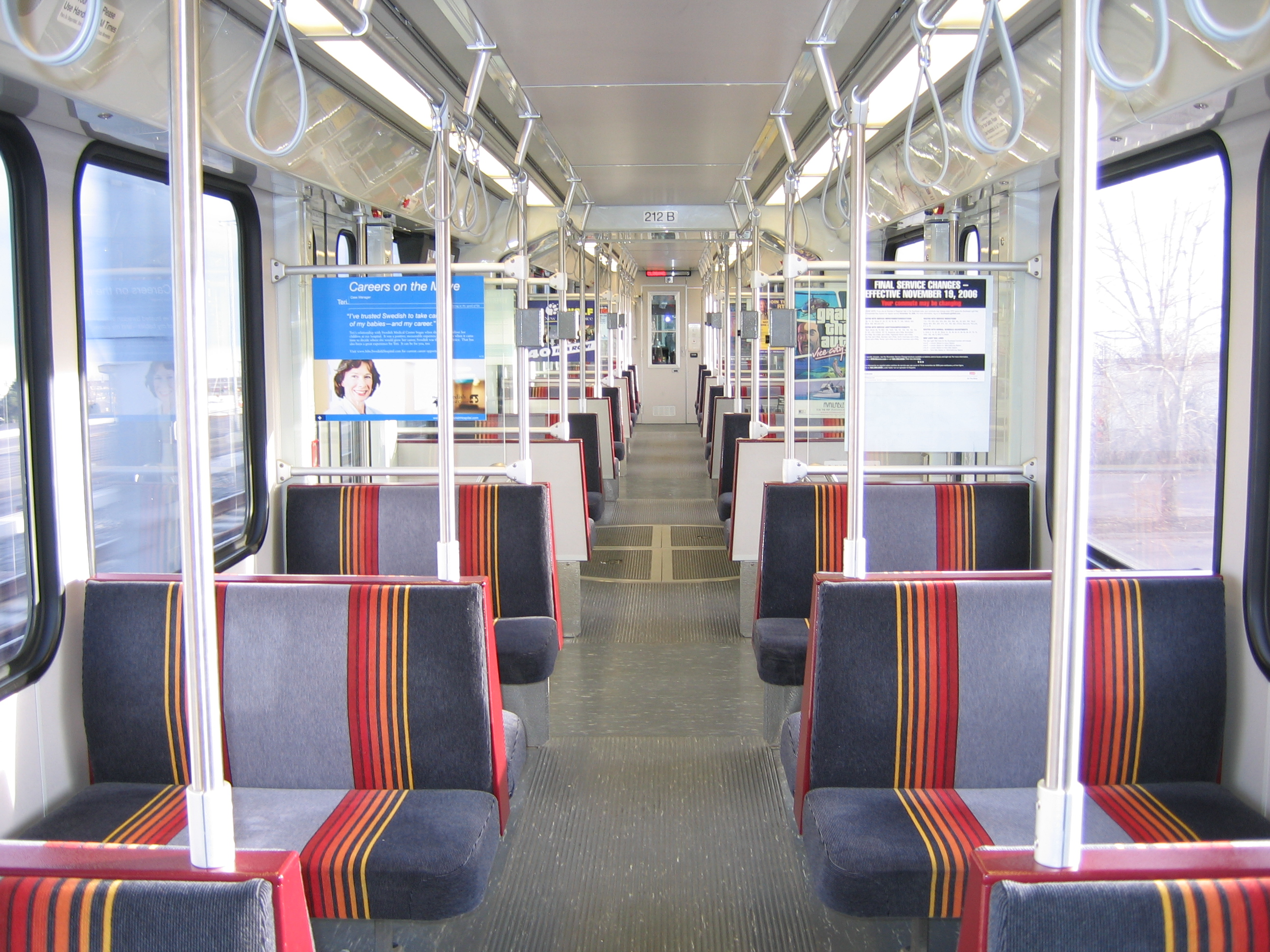
Interior of a RTD light rail train

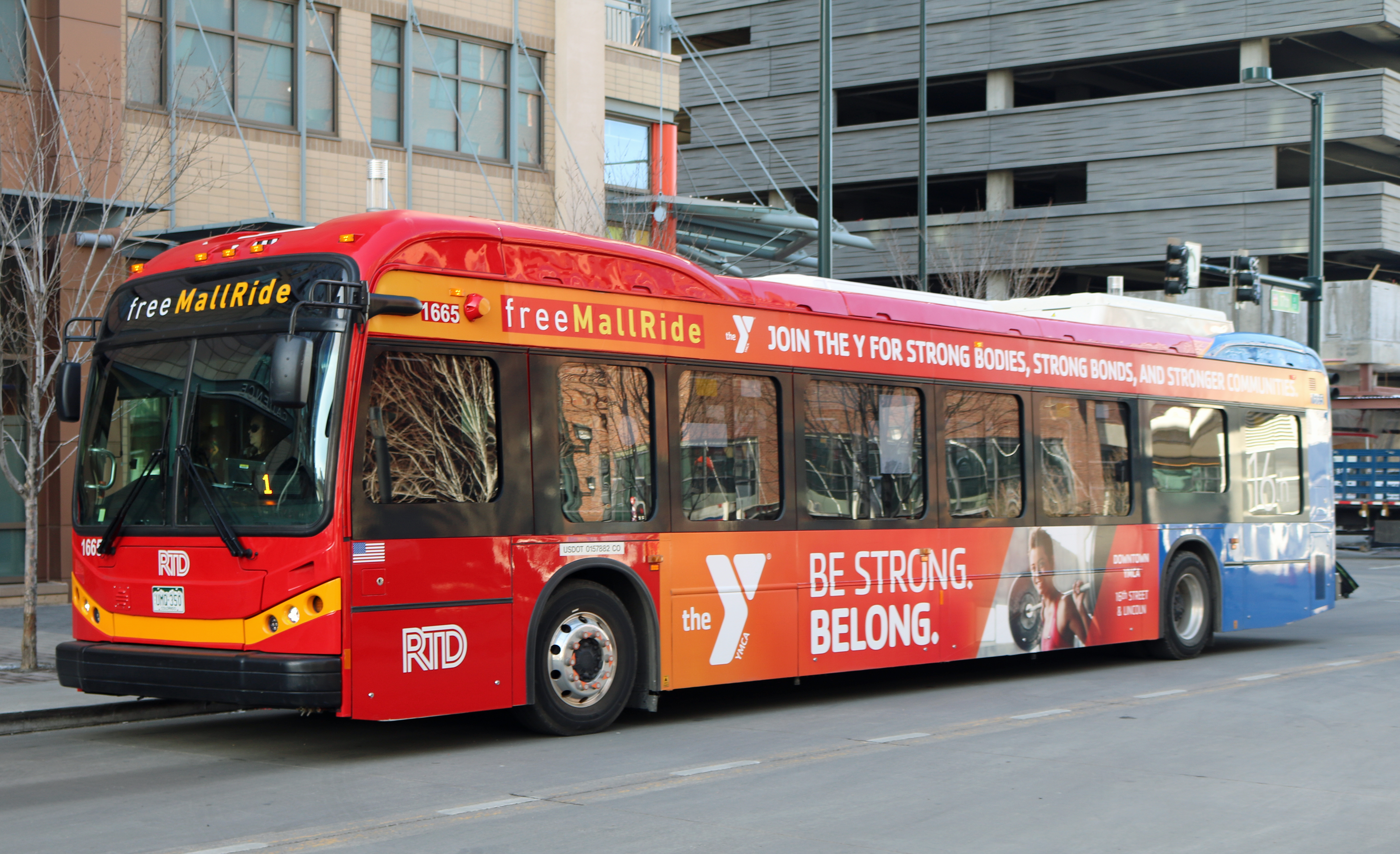
RTD BYD K10MR MallRide bus

As of 2025, RTD owns 1,028 total buses that are used in its active fleet; of them, 607 are operated directly by the agency and 421 are operated by private contractors under contract. Gillig Low Floor buses make up most of the fleet, replacing the Orion V and Gillig Phantom buses that made up most of the fleet until the late 2000s. In 2014, RTD began to receive New Flyer Xcelsior low floor buses for the free MetroRide and other routes. MCI and Neoplan vehicles are used as express buses and regional buses, including service to Denver International Airport branded as SkyRide. In 2016, RTD began receiving delivery of 36 BYD K10MR all-electric buses to be used on the 16th Street Mall, replacing the older locally built TransTeq EcoMark buses in use since 2001. The RTD bus fleet is maintained at five facilities in the Denver area.

As of March 2025, the RTD light rail fleet has 201 light rail vehicles, serving 60.1 miles (96.7 km) of track and 57 stations. All of the vehicles were manufactured by Siemens Mobility and are able to formed into trains of up to four cars; each car has 56 to 64 seats and a listed capacity of 236 passengers. The light rail system is powered by an overhead line energized at 750 volts direct current and each vehicle can reach a maximum speed of 55 miles per hour (89 km/h) in service. The fleet uses high-floor vehicles that require passengers to use stairs to access the low platform or a ramp that meets federal accessibility standards.

The first set of 11 Siemens SD-100 light rail vehicles were delivered in 1993 and entered service the following year. An additional 14 were ordered for the Southwest Corridor extension and delivered beginning in 1999. The first order of 55 Siemens SD-160 vehicles was placed in 2008 and delivery began the following year. The light rail vehicles feature heated systems to keep pantographs, mirrors, windshields, couplers, batteries, and steps free of snow and ice buildup. The SD-160 uses a sliding door instead of a bifold door to reduce the amount of snow piling up at the doors.

The commuter rail system uses a fleet of 66 Silverliner V electric multiple unit railcars that were manufactured in South Korea by Hyundai Rotem. Each railcar is 85 feet (26 m) long with 91 seats and a total capacity of 170 passengers. They are powered by overhead lines energized at 25 kiovolts alternating current instead of the typical direct current used in the Western United States. The trains are maintained by Denver Transit Partners, the operators of the A, B, and G lines. The commuter rail maintenance facility covers 30 acres (12 ha) in the Globeville neighborhood.

RTD rail fleet
Manufacturer	Model	Year began service	Mode	Quantity
Siemens	SD-100	1994	Light rail	49
Siemens	SD-160	2006	Light rail	152
Hyundai Rotem	Silverliner V	2016	Commuter rail	66

== Technology ==
In 2006/2007, RTD worked with the city of Boulder, the University of Colorado, and real-time bus-tracking outfit NextBus on a GPS-based system to help riders with bus arrival information at selected high-traffic stops, but the experiment proved to be unreliable and was discontinued. Several years later, RTD started making its bus location and route data available to third-party developers. Google Maps (website and mobile apps) started offering real-time bus information, as did various other mobile app developers with free or paid apps, such as the Transit app. In March 2017, RTD rolled out Next Ride, a new web-based tracking system that was optimized for mobile devices.

In February 2019, RTD became the first transit authority to integrate its public transport services into the Uber app, enabling Uber riders in Denver to select a new 'Transit' option within the app, powered by Moovit Transit APIs. Users are able to plan journeys with real-time information and directions directly in the app.

== Projects ==
=== Downtown Express ===
This project added HOV lanes to I-25 north of downtown Denver. It also added several dedicated slip ramps for RTD buses to access several Park-n-Ride stations directly from the highway. At the south end of the HOV lanes, buses had direct routes into Union Station or Market Street Station. The HOV lanes extended from I-25 to US 36, allowing regional and express routes running along US 36 to downtown Denver to bypass congestion around the Turnpike Tangle. This project was completed in September 1994.

In 2006, the Downtown Express was renovated to include a toll lane, thereby converting the HOV lanes into high-occupancy toll lanes. This allows single-occupancy vehicles to pay a toll to use them. It was built to increase the overall usage and efficiency of the highway's HOV lanes. The project was completed on June 2, 2006.

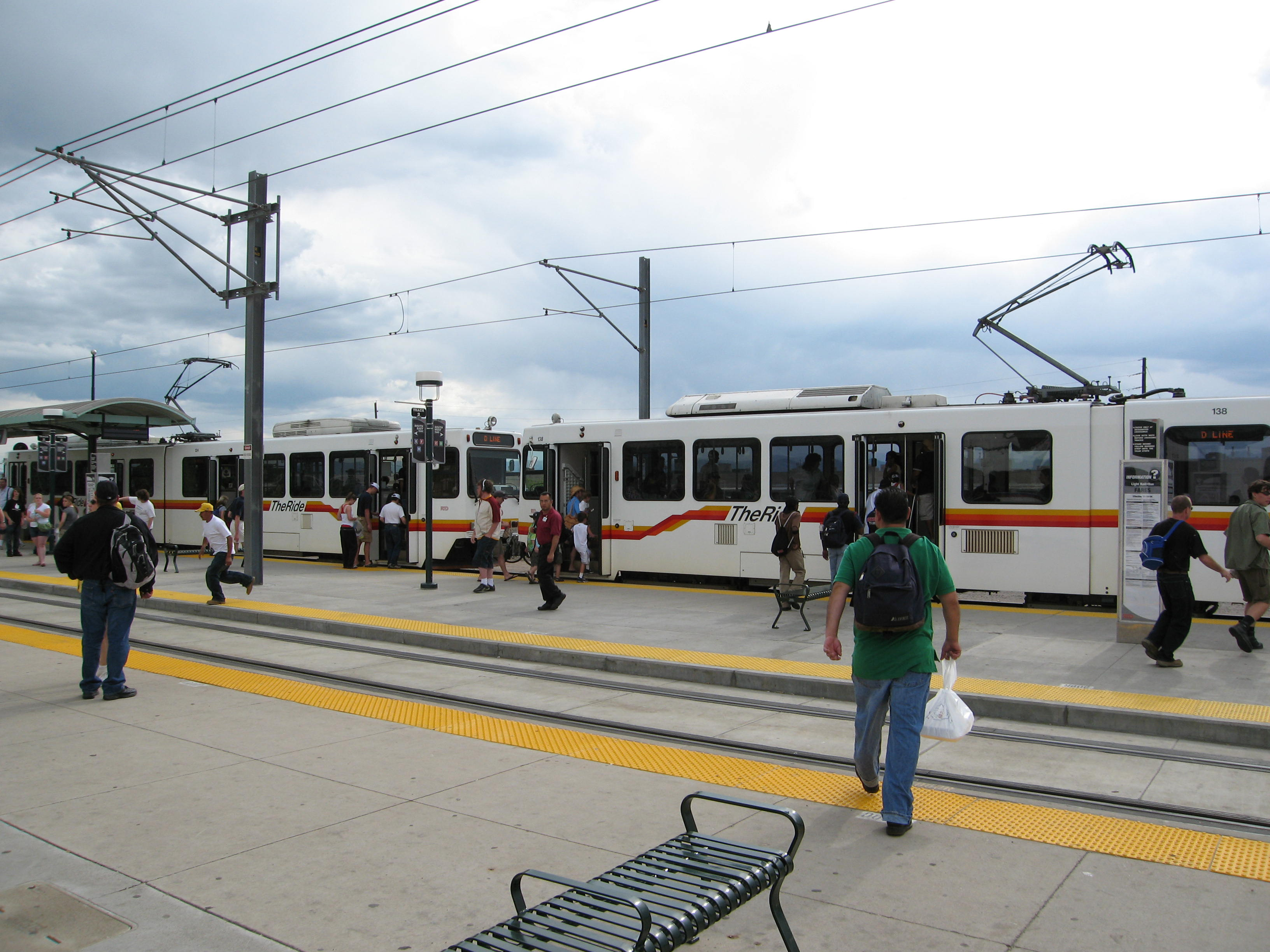
I-25 & Broadway light rail station

=== Central Corridor ===
The Central Corridor, a 5.3-mile (8.5 km) light rail line, opened in October 1994. It was built along Welton Street, through the Five Points district along Stout Street and California Street, and following a railroad right-of-way from Colfax Avenue down to the intersection of I-25 and Broadway. This line was built without the aid of tax increases or federal funds; however, extensions have been funded by the Federal Transit Administration and new tax measures. This line was built from 30th/Downing as the northern terminus to I-25/Broadway as the southern terminus.

=== Southwest Corridor ===
After the success of the Central Corridor, the Southwest Corridor light rail route opened in July 2000. An 8.7-mile (14.0 km) light rail line, the route runs from the terminus of the Central Corridor at I-25 & Broadway to Mineral Avenue in Littleton with five existing stations. The line has been popular, and the Park-n-Ride lots at its stations often experience parking shortages. This project built a light rail line from I-25/Broadway south to Littleton/Mineral alongside existing freight tracks used by BNSF and Union Pacific next to Santa Fe Drive.

=== Central Platte Valley Corridor ===
In April 2002, the Central Platte Valley (CPV) spur opened. It is a 1.8-mile (2.9 km) branch with four stations that provides light rail access to numerous venues, including the Auraria Campus, Broncos Stadium at Mile High, Ball Arena, Elitch Gardens, Union Station and Coors Field. This project built light rail lines from 10th/Osage to Union Station.

=== T-REX Project ===
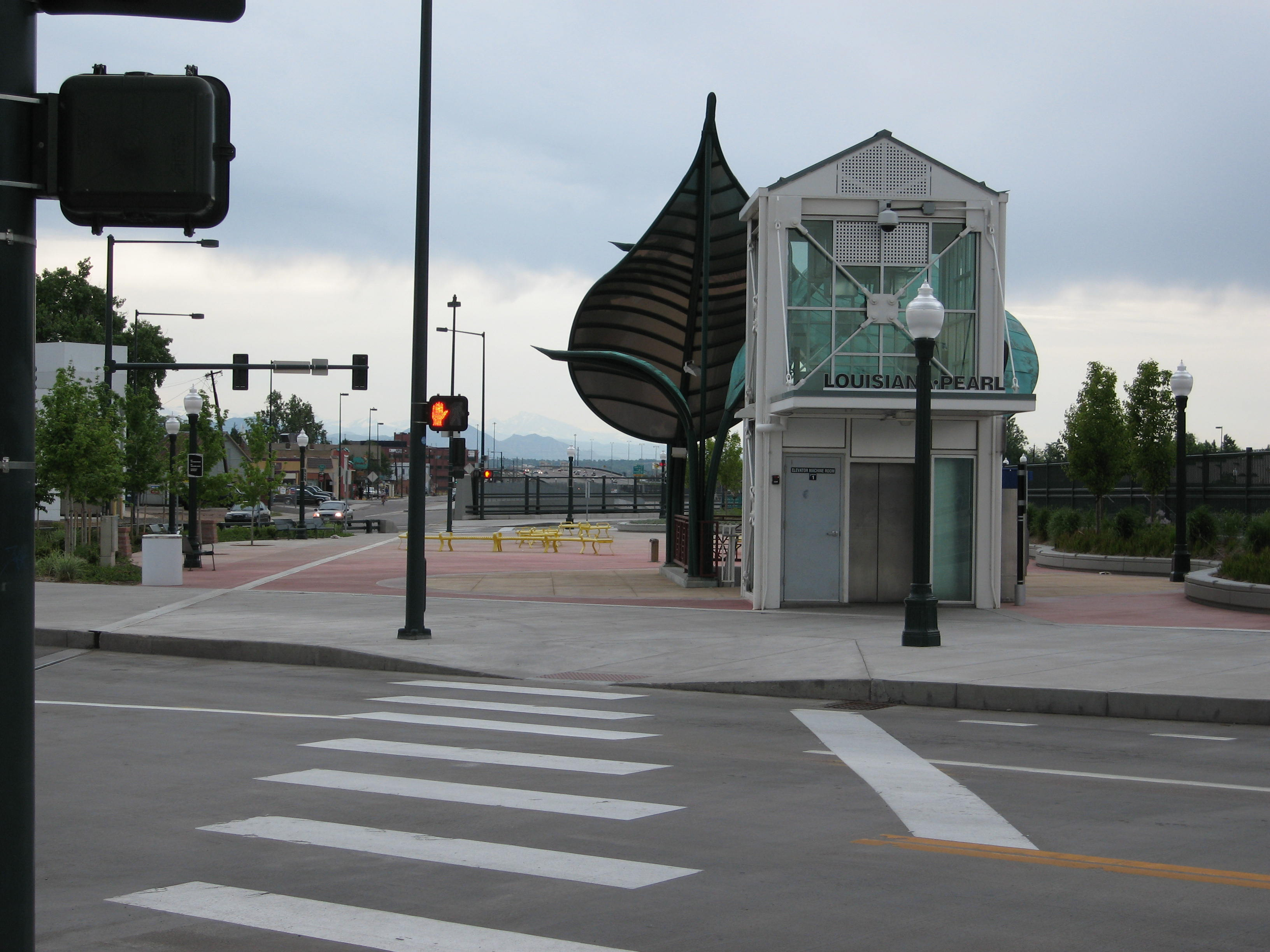
Louisiana-Pearl light rail station

In November 1999, Denver area voters approved a project, known as the T-REX, which involved reconstruction of I-25 between Broadway and Lincoln Avenue in Lone Tree, and I-225 between I-25 and Parker Road in Aurora, with widening of the road to five lanes and light rail being built. The highway project was completed on August 22, 2006. The light rail line, known as the Southeast Corridor, opened shortly after 11 a.m. on November 17, 2006. The line covers 19.1 miles (30.7 km) and includes thirteen new stations, with parking available at all but the Louisiana/Pearl station.

=== West Rail Line ===
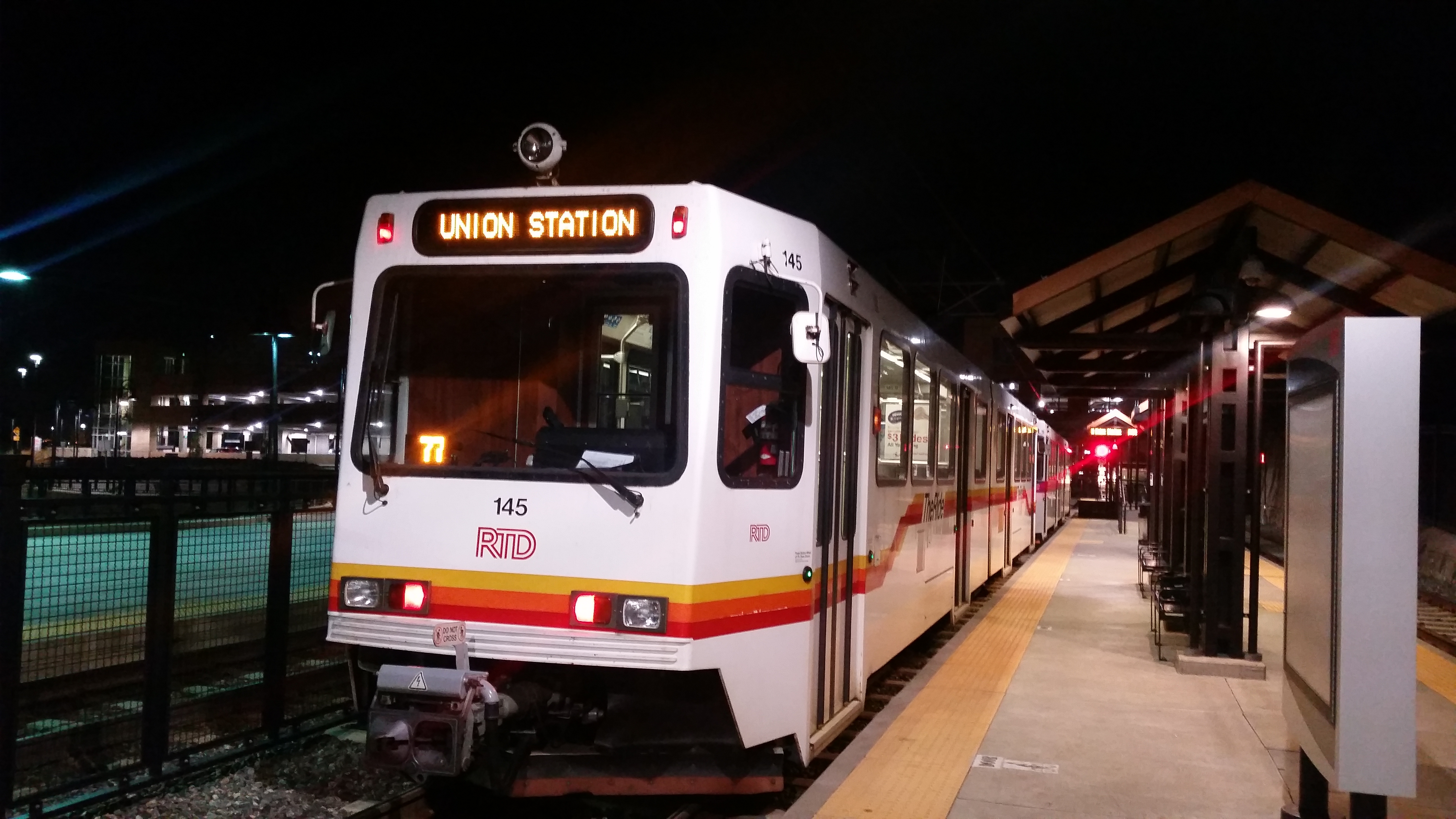
W Line train at Jefferson County station heading back to Union Station in Denver.

The West Rail Line, now known as the W Line, opened on April 26, 2013. It was the first completed rail line of the RTD FasTracks Project. The 12.1 miles (19.5 km) of light rail run between Denver Union Station and Jefferson County Government/Golden Station, adding 11 new stations, 6 park-n-rides, and 3 new call-n-rides.

=== FasTracks ===
FasTracks is a major project underway to expand the Denver metro area's light rail and bus service and to add commuter rail service. A 2004 referendum approved tax increases to support FasTracks. As of December 2020, completed sections include the W Line to Golden (opened 2013), the US 36 Bus Rapid Transit lanes and service to Boulder (Flatiron Flyer, 2016), the redevelopment of Union Station and surrounding area as a transportation hub and transit-oriented development (completed in 2014), the free MetroRide downtown circulator (bus, 2014), a segment of the B Line to Westminster (opened 2016), the University of Colorado A Line to Denver International Airport (opened 2016), the R Line from Peoria Station in Aurora to Lone Tree Station (opened 2017), the G Line to Arvada (opened 2019), the N Line to Thornton (opened 2020) and the E Line, F Line, and R Line extensions (opened 2019).

Extensions to the Southwest Light Rail Corridor, the L Light Rail Line, and the B and N Commuter Rail lines are planned via the FasTracks project. A BRT line on East Colfax Avenue is also planned to open in 2027. Scheduled completion dates for remaining segments extend as far ahead as 2044.

== Art on the light rail system ==
In 1977, Colorado passed the Art in Public Places bill which required that 1 percent of all state-funded construction budgets be used to purchase art. About $1 million from the T-REX contingency budget was dedicated to art projects at each of the 13 new southeast corridor light rail stations as part of RTD's art-n-Transit program.

- Ira Sherman, "Stange Machine," Louisiana/Pearl Station
- Ries Niemi, "Big Boots," Colorado Station
- John Goe, "Reflective Discourse," University Station
- Gregory Gove, "Connected," Yale Station
- Chris Janney, "Harmonic Pass: Denver," Southmoor Station
- Richard C. Elliott, "Thunder Over the Rockies," Belleview Station
- Christopher Weed, "Windswept," Dayton Station
- Dwight Atkinson, "Yet Another Way To Know That Nature Will Eventually Win," Nine Mile Station
- Wopo Holup, "Orchard Memory," Orchard Station
- Michael Clapper, "Nucleus," Arapahoe at Village Center Station
- John McEnroe, "Fools Gold," Dry Creek Station
- Emmett Culligan, "Plow," County Line Station
- Ray King, "Sun Stream," Lincoln Station

Susan Cooper and Rafe Ropek were commissioned to create stylized artwork for station elements, such as windscreens, benches, roof structures, railings, and bicycle racks.

== Ridership ==
=== Commuter rail ===
The ridership statistics shown here are of all commuter rail lines.

=== Light rail ===
The ridership statistics shown here are of all light rail lines.

=== Bus ===
The ridership statistics shown here are of fixed route services only and do not include demand response or vanpool.

== See also ==
- Denver-Aurora-Greeley, CO Combined Statistical Area
- List of bus transit systems in the United States
- List of rail transit systems in the United States
- List of tram and light rail transit systems
- List of suburban and commuter rail systems
