= Bus rapid transit in the Denver metropolitan area =

Express bus system in Colorado, US

The Denver metropolitan area currently has one bus rapid transit service, the Flatiron Flyer, with three more under construction.

== Flatiron Flyer ==
Flatiron Flyer

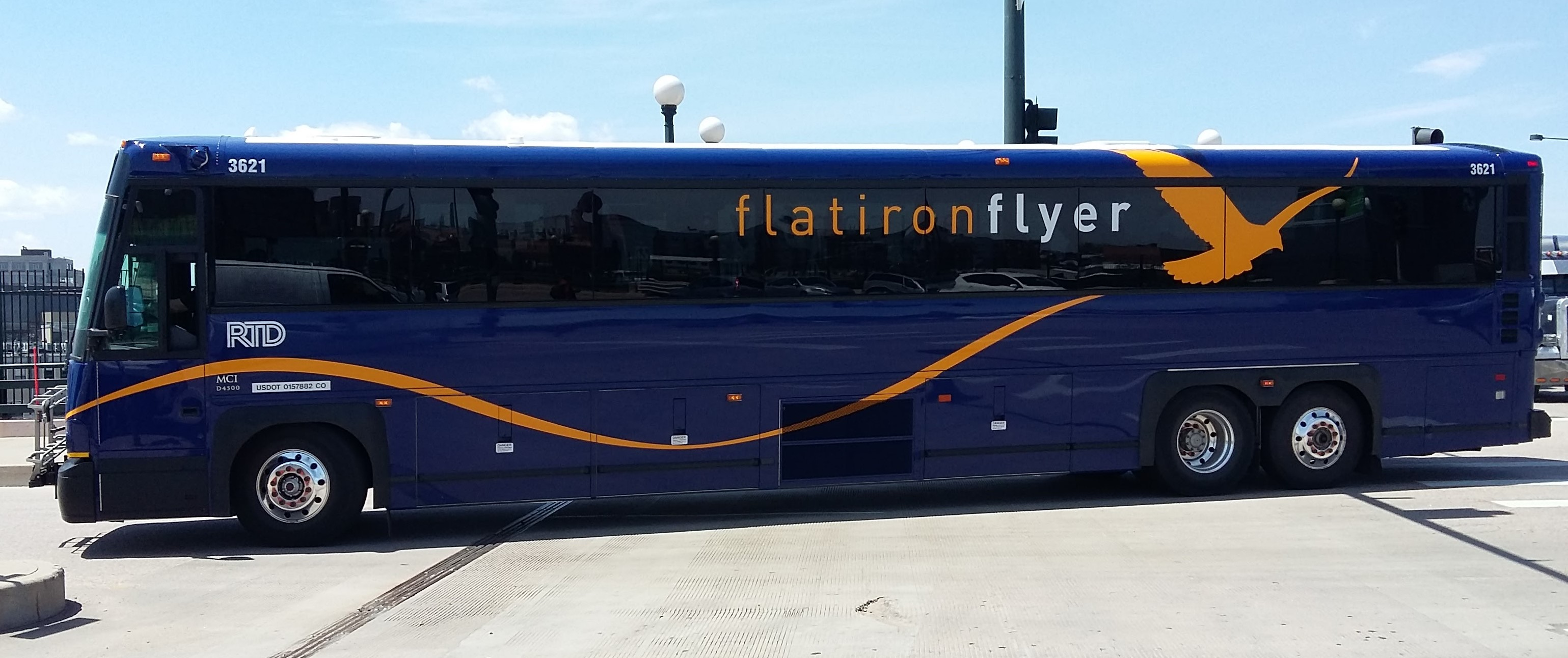
- Flatiron Flyer bus on Wewatta Street in Denver

Overview
- Operator: Regional Transportation District
- Garage: Platte Division, Boulder Division
- Vehicle: 56 MCI D4500CL coaches
- Began service: January 3, 2016; 10 years ago
- Predecessors: BF, BMX, BV, BX, HX, S, T, 86X, 90L

Route
- Locale: Denver metropolitan area
- Communities served: Aurora, Boulder, Broomfield, Denver, Superior, Westminster
- Start: Denver Union Station, Civic Center Station, Anschutz Medical Campus
- Via: U.S. Route 36
- End: Downtown Boulder Station, Boulder Junction Station

Service
- Frequency: Peak: 10 minutes Off-peak: 30 minutes
- Weekend frequency: Saturday: 15 minutes Sunday: 30 minutes
- Ridership: 1,336,324 (FY2025, annual)

Flatiron Flyer is an 18-mile (29 km) express bus system between Denver, Aurora, and Boulder, Colorado, traveling along U.S. Route 36. Different levels of service are available, including a non-stop from Boulder to Union Station in high-occupancy toll lanes (HOT lanes), and all-stop, which serves six park-and-rides along U.S. Route 36 in normal highway lanes. The line branches out to different destinations in Denver, Aurora and Boulder. The Regional Transportation District operates the line, opened on January 3, 2016.

The ITDP classified the system as "not bus rapid transit" (BRT), due to the use of lanes shared with private cars along US 36, lack of street level boarding/alighting and the lack of an off-board fare system. The system has been criticized as an example of bus rapid transit creep because RTD and the Colorado DOT claim the Flatiron Flyer is bus rapid transit despite it lacking most BRT features.

=== Route ===
A branching route system is employed, with the backbone of the system being the HOT lanes along U.S. Route 36. High-occupancy vehicles and buses travel free in the HOT lanes, while single-occupancy vehicles must pay between $1.25 to $7.60, depending on time of day, or up to $13.68 without an electronic toll collection pass. The HOT lane will be managed to ensure that traffic will flow at 50 to 55 miles per hour (80 to 89 km/h). Union Station and Civic Center in Denver and Anschutz Medical Campus in Aurora serve as the southern termini, while Downtown Boulder and Boulder Junction are the northern termini.

Given that the Flatiron Flyer travels with other vehicles in the HOT lanes, the lack of street level boarding and alighting, and the lack of an off-board fare system, it has been classified as "Not BRT" by the Institute for Transportation and Development Policy, which promotes construction of BRT systems. This new system has been criticized as bus rapid transit creep.The original FasTracks plan approved by voters indicated that center-line BRT stations would be created to avoid buses exiting the highway and sitting at traffic intersections. However, this plan was shelved and three of the stops were redesigned to use slip ramps instead.

Subsequent plans to give buses the right to use the shoulder as a travel lane during traffic jams required a change in law; RTD buses got the go-ahead in March 2016, and took effect in April of that year.

==== Stops ====
There are six park-and-rides along U.S. Route 36 from Denver to Boulder, which have been dubbed "stations", that will be served by Flatiron Flyer:

- US 36 – Sheridan (1,310 parking spaces)
- US 36 – Church Ranch (394 parking spaces)
- US 36 – Broomfield (pedestrian bridge, 940 parking spaces)
- US 36 – Flatiron (264 parking spaces)
- US 36 – McCaslin (pedestrian bridge, 466 parking spaces)
- US 36 – Table Mesa (pedestrian bridge, 824 parking spaces)

These stops have ticket vending machines, and passenger information systems.

=== Service ===
Express service between Boulder and Denver is expected to take slightly under an hour, which is about 10 to 15 minutes faster than current bus routes.

There was some opposition to the proposed consolidation of routes between Boulder and Denver. Buses along the most popular routes would come more frequently under the new service plan, but Boulder Junction would receive less service.

=== Service plan ===
Headways along different routes vary based on the time of day.

Route	Routing	Eastbound to Denver					Westbound to Boulder					Notes
Route	Routing	Early AM	AM peak	Midday	PM peak	Late PM	Early AM	AM peak	Midday	PM peak	Late PM	Notes
FF1	Downtown Boulder – Union Station	30 min	15 min	15 min	15 min	30 min	30 min	15 min	15 min	15 min	30 min	
FF2	Downtown Boulder – Union Station Express	–	5 trips	1 trip	3 trips	–	–	4 trips	–	4 trips	–	
FF3	US 36 & Broomfield – Union Station	–	–	–	–	–	–	–	–	–	–	Runs 2 trips per week in each direction (Sunday evenings only)
FF4	Boulder Junction – Civic Center	–	5 trips	1 trip	4 trips	–	–	4 trips	–	4 trips	–	
FF5	Downtown Boulder – Anschutz Medical Center	–	5 trips	–	2 trips	–	–	1 trip	1 trip	3 trips	–	
FF6	Boulder Junction – Union Station		–	–	3 trips			3 trips	–	–		Currently suspended
FF7	US36 & Sheridan – Civic Center		20 min	–	–			–	–	20 min		Currently suspended

=== History ===
Flatiron Flyer was constructed as part of the FasTracks program, which built six new commuter rail, light rail, and bus rapid transit lines in the Denver metropolitan area.

Widening U.S. Route 36 to accommodate the bus line was a joint project between the Colorado Department of Transportation and RTD, termed the US 36 Express Lanes Project. The highway was widened by 40 feet (12 m) in each direction, adding a high-occupancy vehicle lane, which the buses will use when possible. To accommodate the lanes, several bridges were replaced and shoulders were widened. As part of the multi-modal commitment, a concrete trail was added between Westminster and Table Mesa, the U.S. 36 Bikeway. The project was completed in two phases. The first phase, from Federal Boulevard to 88th Street in Louisville/Superior, took three years (July 2012 - July 2015) and cost $317 million. Phase 2 of the project extended the HOT lanes from 88th Street to Table Mesa Drive in Boulder through a public–private partnership; it opened on January 3, 2016, with toll collection starting in March of that year.

=== Fleet ===
In June 2015, RTD announced the $35 million purchase of 59 MCI D-Series motorcoaches, each of these 45-foot (14 m) buses can carry up to 57 passengers.

In August 2015, the University of Colorado (CU) paid $5 million over five years to place advertisements on Flatiron Flyer buses, with an option to extend for another five years. The deal also included the naming rights for the DIA rail line, dubbed the University of Colorado A Line.

=== Criticism ===
Originally, the voter-approved plan called for a 41-mile (66 km) high-capacity commuter rail line running from Denver Union Station to Longmont, passing through North Denver, Adams County, Westminster, Broomfield, Louisville and Boulder. RTD opened the first segment of this rail line, the B Line, from Union Station to Westminster Station — near 71st Ave. and Federal Blvd. — in July 2016. The completion of the originally-planned route from Westminster to Longmont has been delayed until 2044 due to lower tax revenues and higher costs than expected. RTD introduced "Flatiron Flyer" as its brand for the US 36 Bus Rapid Transit component of FasTracks, serving travelers between Denver and Boulder. As an interim measure until Northwest Rail can be completed, RTD committed to study high-speed bus options in other parts of the corridor as well as the possibility of extending the North Metro Line to Longmont. The consolidation of current express service between Denver and Boulder into the Flatiron Flyer system attracted criticism from Boulder residents, since increased frequencies would be balanced with some service cuts. Additionally, the ITDP classifies the system as "not bus rapid transit", due to the use of lanes shared with private cars along US 36.

== LYNX ==
LYNX

Overview
- Operator: Regional Transportation District
- Began service: 2027; 1 year's time
- Predecessors: 15, 15L

Route
- Locale: Denver metropolitan area
- Communities served: Aurora, Denver
- Start: Denver Union Station
- End: Colfax

Service
- Frequency: Peak: 4 minutes Off-peak: 15 minutes

LYNX is a planned bus rapid transit line serving Denver and Aurora. The line travels along East Colfax Avenue, is under construction, and is planned to open in 2027. The line will serve the most heavily travelled public transit corridor in Denver.

The first phase of the Colfax BRT project opened on September 27, 2026. At that time, RTD's 15 and 15L routes, the predecessors to LYNX, began using the center-running bus lanes on East Colfax Avenue between Broadway and Colorado Boulevard. The 15 and 15L will maintain their existing routes and frequencies and will not be branded as bus rapid transit during this interim operation period. The full project is not expected to be completed until 2027. When complete, buses with dedicated amenities and branding will be introduced. The 15 and 15L will be discontinued and replaced by LYNX.

Additional bus rapid services are planned along Federal Boulevard, Colorado Boulevard, and West 38th Avenue; these routes will also carry the LYNX branding if constructed. These routes are in various stages of planning and do not have a set opening date as of 2026.

== Diagonal Flyer ==
The Diagonal Flyer is an under-construction express bus line in Boulder and Longmont, Colorado. Buses will run in two patterns, the DF1, which will run all-week, for most of the day between Longmont and Downtown Boulder Station, mirroring the route of, but doubling service on what is now the BOLT route, and the DF2, which will run on weekday peak hours only between Longmont and Boulder Junction, mirroring the alignment and service levels of the former route J.

Construction started on September 23, 2024, and service is projected to start in May of 2027.

== CO-7 BRT ==
BRT on State Highway 7, between Boulder and Brighton, is planned to open in 2027, with a "starter service" in 2026.
