= Michael Harris =

Michael or Mike Harris may refer to:

== Entertainment ==
- Michael Harris (glassworker) (1933–1994), English glassworker
- Michael Harris (poet) (born 1944), Canadian poet and translator
- Michael Harris (journalist) (born 1948), Canadian author, investigative journalist, and radio personality
- Michael Harris (trumpeter) (born 1953), musician for the Chicago-based Phenix Horns
- Mike Harris (comics) (born 1962), American comic book artist
- Michael Harris (producer) (born 1964), American television producer and filmmaker
- Mick Harris (born 1967), British musician
- Michael John Harris (born 1980), Canadian magazine editor and writer
- Michael Harris, a character in the television show Falling Skies
- Michael Harris, a character on the TV sitcom Newhart
- Michael "Harry-O" Harris (born 1960), a businessman involved with Death Row Records

== Politics ==
- Michael Harris (politician, born 1979), Canadian politician
- Mike Harris (born 1945), Canadian politician, 22nd Premier of Ontario (1995–2002)
- Mike Harris Jr. (born 1985), Canadian politician, son of the Premier of Ontario
- Mike Harris (Michigan politician), member of the Michigan House of Representatives
- Michael Terry Harris (1946–2010), member of the Kansas State Senate

== Academics ==
- Michael Harris (mathematician) (born 1954), American professor
- Michael Harris (public policy scholar) (born 1956), Israeli-American professor and academic administrator

== Sports ==
- Mike Harris (racing driver) (1939–2021), South African racing driver
- Pasty Harris (Michael John Harris, 1944–2025), English cricketer
- Mike Harris (curler) (born 1967), Canadian curler, silver medalist in the 1998 Winter Olympics
- Mike Harris (rower) (born 1969), British Olympic rower
- Mike Harris (basketball) (born 1983), American basketball player
- Mike Harris (rugby union) (born 1988), rugby player for Queensland Reds and Melbourne Rebels
- Michael Harris (offensive lineman, born 1988), American football player
- Michael Harris (offensive lineman, born 1966), American football player
- Mike Harris (cornerback) (born 1989), American football player
- Michael Harris (basketball, born 1999), Australian basketball player
- Michael Harris (squash player) (born 1989), English squash player
- Michael Harris (soccer) (born 1991), American soccer player
- Michael Harris II (born 2001), American baseball player

== Other ==
- Michael Harris, 9th Baron Harris (born 1941), Rear Admiral, Captain of HMS Cardiff during the Falklands War
- Mike Harris (entrepreneur) (born 1949), Welsh businessman and football executive
- Michael Darnell Harris (born 1963), American serial killer
- Michael Harris-Love (born 1968), American researcher and physical therapy program director

== See also ==
- Harris (surname)
