= Laura Phelps Rogers =

Laura Phelps Rogers is a sculptor who works with bronze, iron, and other metal fabrication techniques, as well as photography and site-specific installations.

Born in Denver, Colorado, Phelps Rogers sees her work as an

"extension of early feminist art practice teasing out conversations of modern day feminity through her mediums. Concerning herself with question of and definitions of what contemporary western art is including her work and concepts as an extension of the Western landscape." 

She has been part of the Pirate and Ice Cube Co-Ops in Denver, and in 2018 opened FoolPRoof Gallery in the River North Arts District. Phelps Rogers has a connection to antiques, which she says:

brings a historic aesthetic to my contemporary sculpture. It's all documentation — me remembering things that have come and gone. All of my work is memory-based, layered in a complex manner.

Her work is held by the Denver Art Museum, the Anschutz Medical Campus, Lamar Station Crossing and the Talsi Regional Museum in Latvia.
