= John Cambier =

American immunologist and microbiologist

- Born: 1948 (age 77–78)
- Education: University of Iowa
- Scientific career
- Fields: Microbiology; Immunology
- Workplaces: University of Colorado Anschutz
- Thesis: The secretory immune system of the rat (1975)
- Doctoral advisor: John Butler

John Clifford Cambier is an American immunologist and microbiologist, currently a Distinguished Professor at Anschutz Medical Campus and former department chair there, and also a published author. He has received recognition from professional organizations.

Cambier is editor of the academic journal Immunological Reviews and a member of the editorial board of LymphoSign Journal.

He has been an invited lecturer at several conferences.

He received his Ph.D. from the University of Iowa Department of Microbiology in 1975. His research supervisor was John Butler.

== Books ==
- —, ed. (2018) [1986]. B-Lymphocyte Differentiation. CRC Press. ISBN 978-1-351-08691-2.
- Weiss, Arthur; Mond, James J.; —, eds. (1989). Regulation of Cell Growth and Activation. Raven Press. ISBN 978-0-88167-573-3.
- —, ed. (1990). Ligands, Receptors, and Signal Transduction in Regulation of Lymphocyte Function. American Society for Microbiology. ISBN 978-1-55581-021-4.
- Weiss, Arthur; Mond, James J.; —, eds. (1991). Cell Activation: Genetic Approaches. Raven Press. ISBN 978-0-88167-819-2.
