= Single-occupant vehicle =

Single-occupant vehicle may refer to:

- Single-occupant vehicle, a vehicle designed to accommodate only one person (the driver) - for very small cars, see Microcar, Bubblecar, and Cyclecar
- Single-occupancy vehicle, a vehicle designed to accommodate more than one person, but being used to transport only one person (the driver)
- Single-seater car, an open-wheel (i.e. wheels are outside the main body) car, usually built specifically for racing and having only one seat
