= Immunological Reviews =

- Subject: Immunology
- Language: English
- Edited by: John Cambier

Publication details
- History: 1977–present
- Publisher: John Wiley & Sons
- Frequency: 8/year
- Open access: Hybrid
- Impact factor: 8.3 (2024)

Standard abbreviations
- ISO 4: Immunol. Rev.

Indexing
- CODEN: IMRED2
- ISSN: 0105-2896 (print); 1600-065X (web)
- LCCN: 2004233460
- OCLC no.: 909877157

Links
- Journal homepage; Online access; Online archive

Immunological Reviews is a peer-reviewed medical journal covering immunology. It is published by John Wiley & Sons and was established in 1977. The editor-in-chief is John Cambier (University of Colorado Anschutz).

== Abstracting and indexing ==
The journal is abstracted and indexed in:

- BIOSIS Previews
- Current Contents/Life Sciences
- EBSCO databases
- Embase
- Index Medicus/MEDLINE/PubMed
- ProQuest databases
- Science Citation Index Expanded
- Scopus

According to the Journal Citation Reports, the journal has a 2024 impact factor of 8.3.
