= University of Colorado Physical Therapy Program =

Doctor of Physical Therapy Program in Colorado, USA

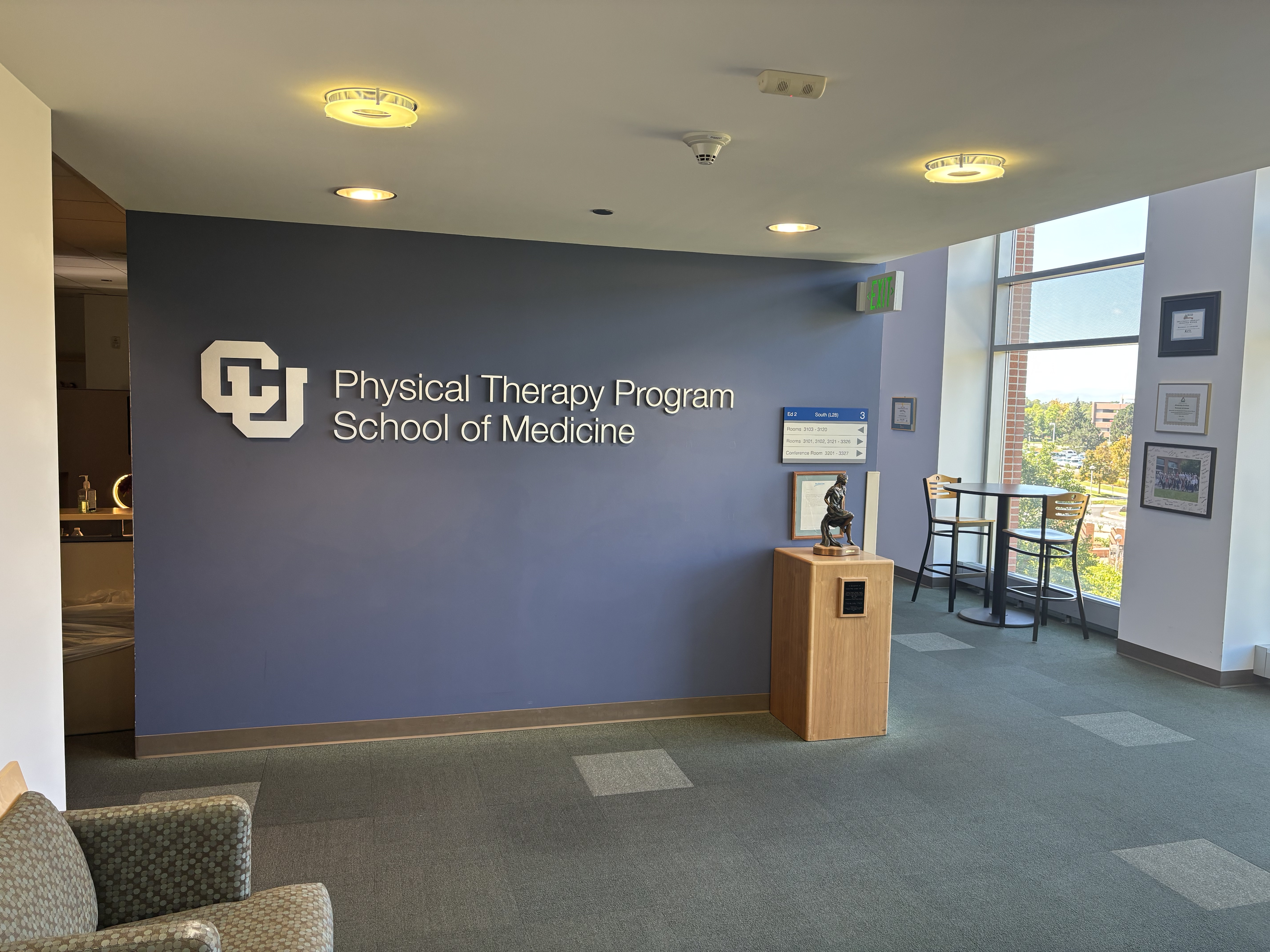
- Lobby of the CU Physical Therapy Program at Anschutz Medical Campus
- Type: Entry-Level Program for Physical Therapists
- Established: November 1, 1947; 78 years ago
- Accreditation: CAPTE
- Academic affiliations: University of Colorado
- Director: Michael Harris-Love
- Academic staff: 27 Full-Time, 161 Adjunct, 9 Administrative
- Doctoral students: 222 DPT Students, 30 PhD Students
- Other students: 5 Residents
- Location: Aurora, Colorado, 80045, United States; 39°44′43.55″N 104°50′15.53″W
- Campus: Large city
- Residency Programs: Orthopaedic, Pediatric, Faculty Development
- Website: medschool.cuanschutz.edu/physical-therapy-program

The University of Colorado Physical Therapy Program (CU Physical Therapy or CU PT) is administered by the Department of Physical Medicine & Rehabilitation (PM&R) and the University of Colorado School of Medicine. The program has a focus on research, education, and service related to physical therapy and rehabilitation science. The Residential Doctor of Physical Therapy degree (DPT) Pathway is located at the University of Colorado Anschutz Medical Campus (CU Anschutz), and the Hybrid DPT Pathway is located at the University of Colorado Colorado Springs (UCCS).

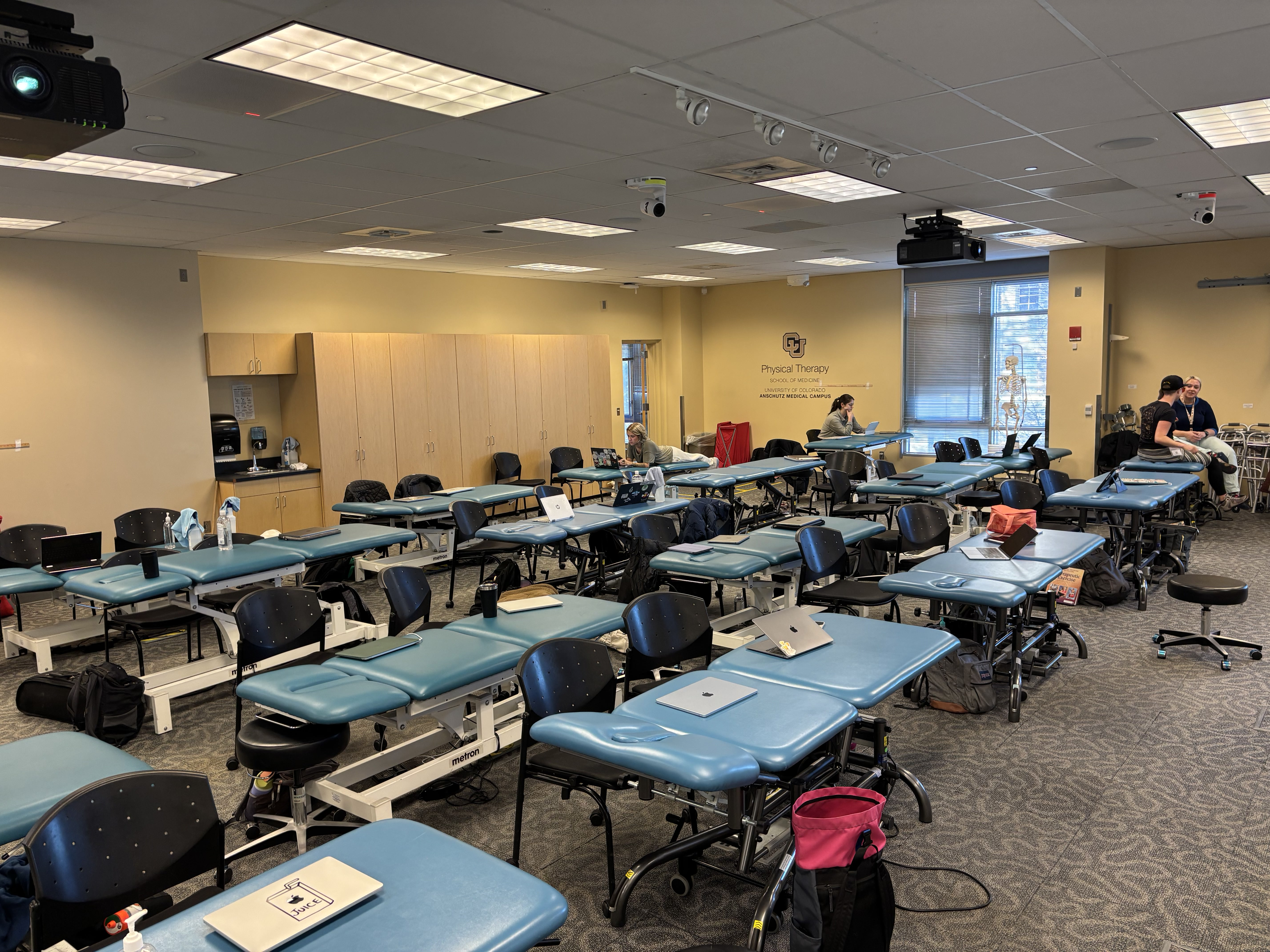
Doctor of Physical Therapy students during a classroom lab session at the University of Colorado Anschutz, 2025.

The program grants doctoral degrees in physical therapy (DPT), Rehabilitation Science (PhD), and provides a dual degree DPT-Master of Public Health (MPH) track in partnership with the Colorado School of Public Health. The program also offers physical therapy residency programs in orthopaedics, pediatrics, and faculty development.

== History ==
=== Early history: 1947–1986 ===
The CU Physical Therapy Program received its initial accreditation from the Council of Medical Education and Hospitals of the American Medical Association and the American Physical Therapy Association in 1947. Mary S. Lawrence served as the founding Program Director from 1947 to 1950. Under her direction, the program opened at the University of Colorado Boulder campus with six baccalaureate students who graduated 12 months later with a Certificate in Physical Therapy. During her service to the United States Army, Capt. Lawrence served the Physical Therapy Branch of the Surgeon General`s Office as a technical advisor on the educational film concerning spinal cord injury rehabilitation, Toward Independence, which received the 1949 Academy of Motion Picture Arts and Sciences Oscar award for best documentary film of the year. Capt. Lawrence went on to join Capt. Mary E. Frazee from 1953 to 1954 to lead instruction of the Army Physical Therapy Course. Ms. Lawrence retired at the rank of Lieutenant Colonel. The majority of physical therapists assigned to Army hospitals participated in the Army Physical Therapy Course between 1948 and 1961. Under the leadership of Maj. Barbara M. Robertson, Capt. Frazee and Lawrence trained physical therapy students at the Medical Field Service School in San Antonio, TX who were commissioned as second lieutenants in the Women`s Medical Specialist Corps Reserve.

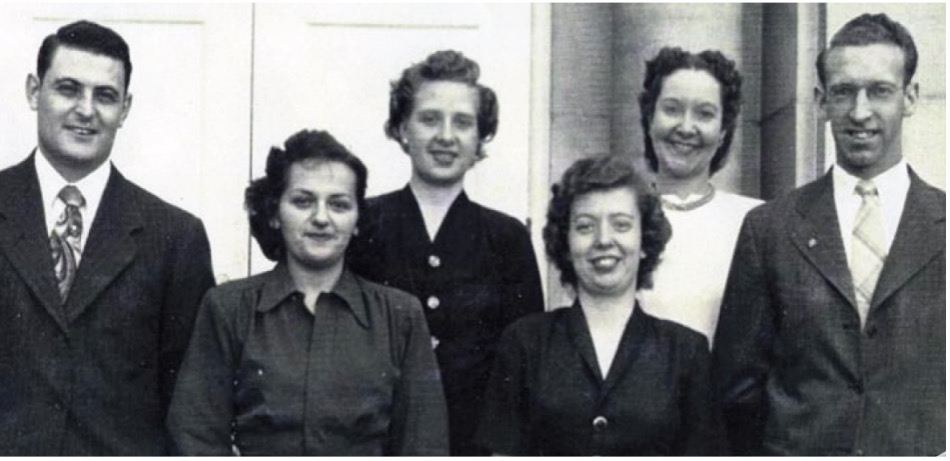
CU PT Class 1948

The leadership of Capt. Lawrence was followed by Dorothy Hoag (1950-1972), the program's longest serving director. Ms. Hoag initially guided students to earn a certificate in Physical Therapy and eventually advanced the program to offer a Bachelor's degree in the profession. During the time that the Bachelor's degree was offered, the first three years were spent in the College of Arts and Sciences on the Boulder campus. The fourth year of the degree program constituted the professional phase of the program and was completed at the University of Colorado Health Sciences Center in Denver. Subsequent Program Directors following Ms. Hoag's retirement included James Clinkingbeard (1972-1977), Elizabeth Barnett (1978-1987), and Marcia Smith (1987-1988). This early period of the program's history is marked by the cessation of the Certificate in Physical Therapy by 1968 and an expansion of the student cohort to 36 people by 1986.

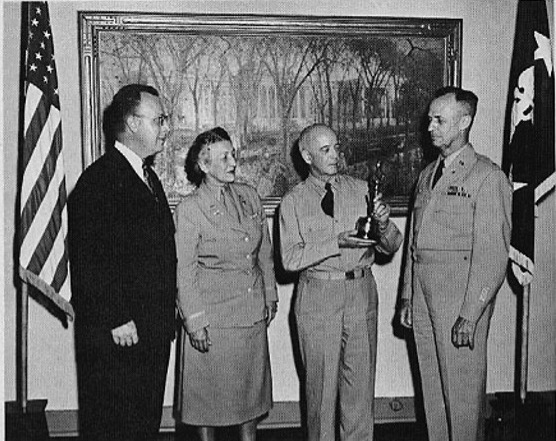
Mary Lawrence Oscar Trophy

=== From Boulder to Aurora: 1988–2008 ===
Dr. Pauline Cerasoli (known as "Polly" to friends and colleagues) assumed the role of Program Director and Assistant Dean of Allied Health in 1988 and led the effort to progress to a Master of Science degree in Physical Therapy. This degree was completed over a 24-months period and was initially earned by 48 students. The last year of Dr. Cerasoli's tenure as Director was notable for conferring the Master of Science in Physical Therapy degree to 61 graduates during the program's 50th anniversary. Dr. Cerasoli's time as Program Director prematurely ended due to critical injuries sustained during an attack by an unknown assailant while attending the APTA Combined Sections Meeting (CSM) in Atlanta in 1996. In honor of Dr. Pauline Cerasoli, the program initiated the Cerasoli Award for Outstanding Contributions to Physical Therapy Education in 1998. The award recognizes individuals with significant contributions toward the academic or clinical education of student physical therapists at the University of Colorado. The American Physical Therapy Association (APTA) Colorado Chapter also honored Dr. Cerasoli by offering the APTA CO Chapter Pauline Cerasoli "ACE" PT Student Award in 1993 and "ACE" PTA Award in 1996. The impact of Dr. Cerasoli's work was nationally recognized by the APTA. The APTA Academy of Education (then called the APTA Section on Education), established the Pauline Cerasoli Lectureship in 1998. The lectureship was made possible through the Cerasoli Fund which was originally created to assist the family in providing Dr. Cerasoli's care. However, the Cerasoli family decided to allocate the funds to the APTA to support an annual lectureship in Dr. Cerasoli's name. Leaders, educators, and practitioners in the field of physical therapy who share the insightful, sensitive, and caring nature embodied by Dr. Cerasoli continue to be recognized through the lectureship series.

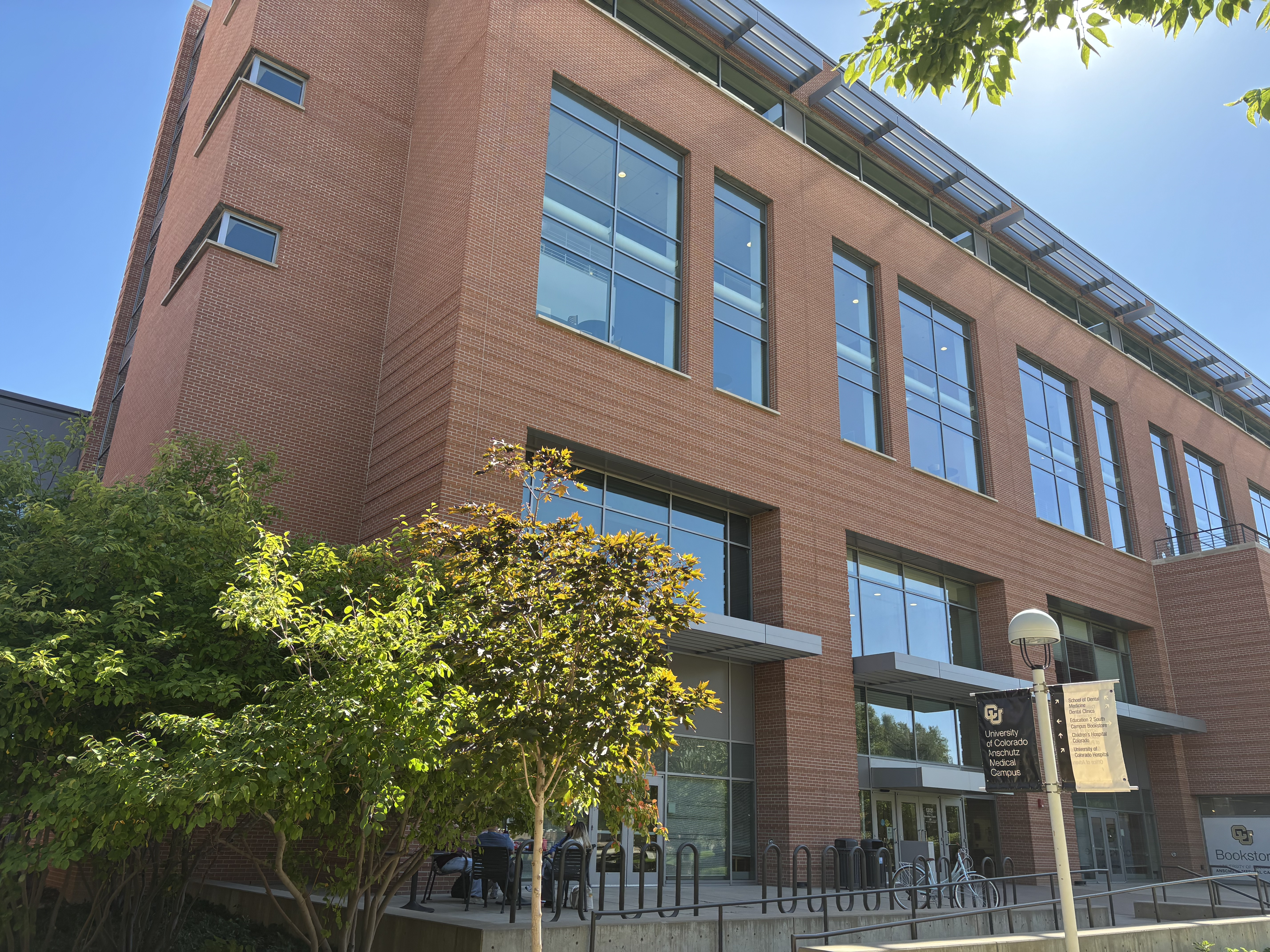
Bookstore building at the University of Colorado Anschutz Medical Campus in Aurora, Colorado.

The directorship of Dr. Carolyn B. Heriza (1996-2005) and Dr. Margaret Schenkman (2005-2019) marked a period of educational and research growth of the program. The Human Performance Laboratory, a joint project between the program, the University of Colorado Health Sciences Center, and University of Colorado Hospital Department of Rehabilitation Medicine, opened in 2000. Notably, the program moved to the School of Medicine and the first class of students was admitted to the Doctor of Physical Therapy program in 2004. Under the leadership of Dr. Schenkman, the Physical Therapy Program moved to the Anschutz Medical Campus in 2007 (which was acquired from the decommissioned Fitzsimons Army Medical Center in 1995). By the end of 2008, academic and research operations of all University of Colorado Denver health sciences schools and colleges relocated to the new campus, joining the affiliated University of Colorado Hospital and Children's Hospital Colorado. The graduation of the first DPT class of the PT Program also occurred during this year.

=== Recent history ===
Scientific advancement and training at the program continued with the creation of the Interdisciplinary Movement Science Laboratory (IMSL) in 2009 with the joint support of the School of Medicine, and the establishment of the Rehabilitation Sciences PhD Program in 2011. The Rehabilitation Sciences PhD Program has grown into a competitive academic unit that includes federally funded Principal Investigators and trainees who consistently garner scholarship support from the Foundation for Physical Therapy Research. The achievements of this research training program are largely due to the contributions of the former PhD Program Director, Dr. Katrina Maluf, and the current PhD Program Director and CU PT Section Director for Research & Development, Dr. Jennifer Stevens-Lapsley. Other milestones during Dr. Schenkman's tenure include the development and implementation of the Physical Therapy Scholarship and Endowment Advisory Board, beginning the optional year-long DPT student internship, and the accreditation of the program's first Physical Therapy Residency (in Pediatrics in partnership with JFK Partners in 2012).

Program Directors
Name	Years as Director
Mary Lawrence	1947-1950
Dorothy Hoag	1950-1972
James Clinkingbeard	1972-1977
Elizabeth Barnett	1978-1987
Marcia Smith	1987-1988
Polly Cerasoli	1988-1996
Carolyn Heriza	1996-2005
Margaret Schenkman	2005-2019
Michael Harris-Love	2019–Present

Dr. Michael Harris-Love became the Program Director and Associate Dean of Physical Therapy Education upon the retirement of Dr. Schenkman in 2019 and Dr. Schenkman was granted emeritus faculty status in 2023. Dr. Harris-Love assumed the program's first endowed faculty position through the Joanne Posner-Mayer Endowed Chair in Physical Therapy within the University of Colorado School of Medicine at the CU Anschutz Medical Campus. Dr. Harris-Love's time as Program Director began under a period of significant transition during the COVID-19 campus shutdown at CU Anschutz in 2020 and program reaccreditation in 2021. Program growth continued with accreditation of Physical Therapy Residencies in Orthopaedics with UCHealth in 2022 and Faculty Development in 2023. During the program's 75th anniversary year, approval was granted to establish a DPT-MPH dual degree track in partnership with the Colorado School of Public Health. Also, through a gradual effort that involved the directorship of both Dr. Schenkman and Dr. Harris-Love from 2017 through 2022, the program gained approval to provide an inter-campus, hybrid education, DPT degree pathway with the University of Colorado Colorado Springs. Principal instruction of the program curriculum for Hybrid Pathway students occurs at the Hybl Sports Medicine and Performance Center in Colorado Springs.

== Distinctions ==
The Doctor of Physical Therapy Program has been ranked 11th among physical therapy schools by US News & World Report.

The CU Physical Therapy Program is one of the few U.S. physical therapy programs with an endowed Chair position. The CU Anschutz Medical Campus established the Joanne Posner-Mayer Endowed Chair in Physical Therapy at the University of Colorado School of Medicine in 2019.

Over $275,000 in Doctor of Physical Therapy student scholarships are disbursed annually due to program benefactors, alumni, and support from the School of Medicine. This effort is administered by the CU Anschutz Office of Advancement, in consultation with the CU Physical Therapy Program Philanthropy & Advisory Council and the Scholarships and Awards Committee.

The American Board of Physical Therapy Residency and Fellowship Education (ABPTRFE) accredited residencies offered by the CU Physical Therapy Program are: the University of Colorado School of Medicine Physical Therapy Orthopaedic Residency in partnership with UCHealth; the University of Colorado Physical Therapy Pediatric Residency with JFK Partners at CU Anschutz; the University of Colorado Anschutz Medical Campus Faculty Residency.

== Notable alumni ==
- David Bruton, Class of 2021, CU Physical Therapy Alumni Association Co-President and member of the Scholarship & Endowment Board; founder of Bruton's Books; clinic owner; former NFL team captain and Super Bowl 50 winner with the Denver Broncos.
