= Colfax station (RTD) =

Light rail station in Aurora, Colorado

Colfax
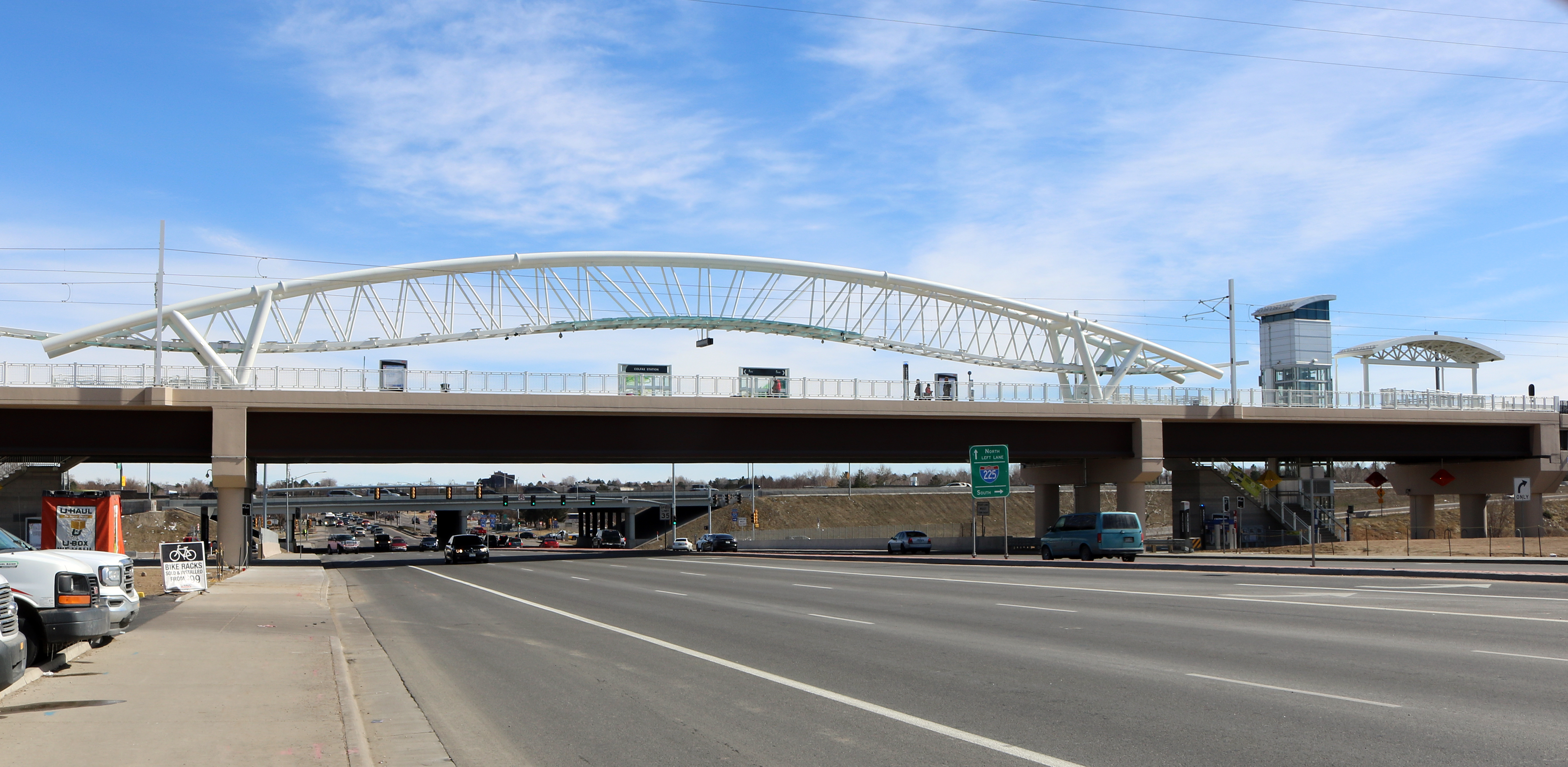
- Colfax station in February 2017

General information
- Location: 13800 East Colfax Avenue; Aurora, Colorado
- Coordinates: 39°44′24.9″N 104°49′37.2″W
- Owner: Regional Transportation District
- Line: I-225 Corridor
- Platforms: 1 island platform
- Tracks: 2
- Connections: RTD Bus: 10, 15, 15L, 20; RTD Flatiron Flyer: FF5; RTD LYNX (2027)

Construction
- Structure type: Elevated
- Cycle facilities: 12 racks
- Accessible: Yes

History
- Opened: February 24, 2017

Passengers
- 2025: 644 (average daily)
- Rank: 49 out of 75

Services
Preceding station	RTD	Following station
Fitzsimons toward Peoria	R Line	13th Avenue toward RidgeGate Parkway
Location

Colfax station is a Regional Transportation District (RTD) light rail and bus rapid transit station on the R Line in Aurora, Colorado. The station opened on February 24, 2017, along with the rest of the R Line.

== Station layout ==
2F

Rail Platform Level

Northbound
← toward Peoria (Fitzsimons)
Island platform, doors will open on the left
Southbound
toward RidgeGate Parkway (13th Avenue) →
1F

Bus Platform Level

Side platform, doors will open on the right
Westbound
← LYNX toward Union Station (Wheeling/VA Medical Center) (2027)
US 40 / East Colfax Avenue; other bus bays
Eastbound
LYNX terminates (2027) →
Side platform, doors will open on the right

The station's R Line platforms are elevated above East Colfax Avenue between Fitzsimons Parkway and Interstate 225. Colfax station is planned to be the eastern terminus of RTD's LYNX bus rapid transit service. The BRT platforms will be built alongside East Colfax Avenue on the station's lower level. Buses will run as frequent as every four minutes from this station west to Union Station. The service is projected to begin in 2027.

The station was one of two planned in 2001 on the former Fitzsimons Army Medical Center, an area that Fitzsimons Redevelopment Authority developed into a campus anchored by the then-University of Colorado Health Sciences Center. The second station planned for the former Fitzsimons Army Medical Center became Fitzsimons station.
