= 13th Avenue station (RTD) =

Light rail station in Aurora, Colorado

13th Avenue
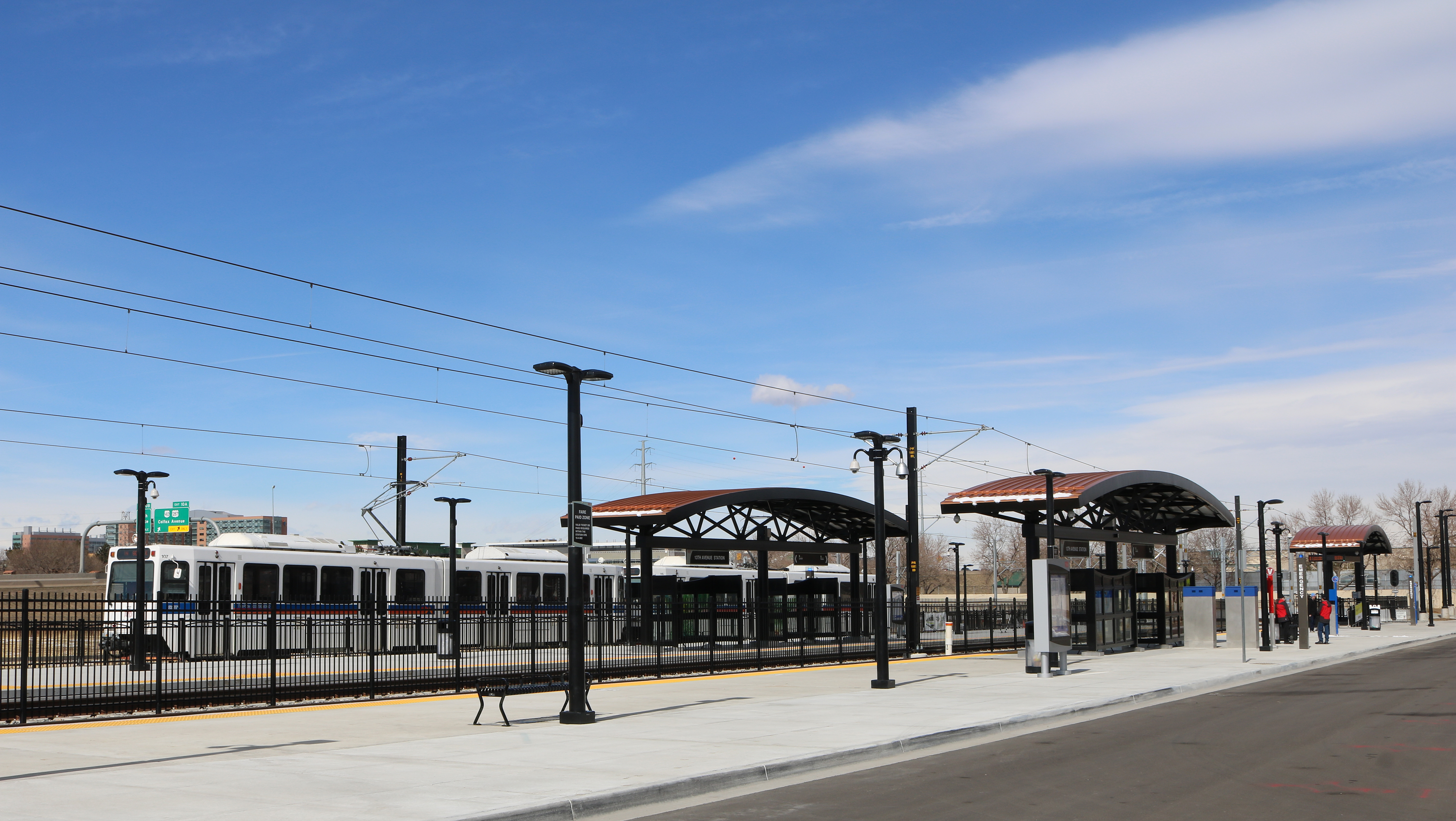
- 13th Avenue station in February 2017

General information
- Location: 14110 East 13th Avenue; Aurora, Colorado
- Coordinates: 39°44′05.9″N 104°49′25.0″W
- Owner: Regional Transportation District
- Line: I-225 Corridor
- Platforms: 2 side platforms
- Tracks: 3

Construction
- Structure type: At-grade
- Parking: 262 spaces
- Cycle facilities: 3 lockers, 5 racks
- Accessible: Yes

History
- Opened: February 24, 2017

Passengers
- 2025: 185 (average daily)
- Rank: 71 out of 75

Services
Preceding station	RTD	Following station
Colfax toward Peoria	R Line	2nd Avenue & Abilene toward RidgeGate Parkway
Location

13th Avenue station is a Regional Transportation District (RTD) light rail station on the R Line in Aurora, Colorado. The station opened on February 24, 2017, along with the rest of the R Line.

== Station layout ==
1F

Platform Level

East 13th Avenue; parking
Side platform, doors will open on the right
Northbound
← toward Peoria (Colfax)
Southbound
toward RidgeGate Parkway (2nd & Abilene) →
Island platform, doors will open on the right

Track not in use

The station is located a short distance from Interstate 225, two blocks west of the intersection between 13th Avenue and Sable Boulevard. 13th Avenue dead-ends into the station's 262-stall park-and-ride lot. Although the station has three tracks, only the two tracks closest to the parking lot are used. There are no bus connections from the station.

While 13th Avenue is planned to be the center of a transit-oriented development, the land around the station remains largely undeveloped as of 2026. With an average daily total of 185 passengers, 13th Avenue is the least used station on the R Line, and the fifth-least used in the entire RTD rail system.
