= Michael Harris-Love =

American physical therapist and researcher

Michael Harris-Love PT, MPT, DSc, FGSA, FAPTA
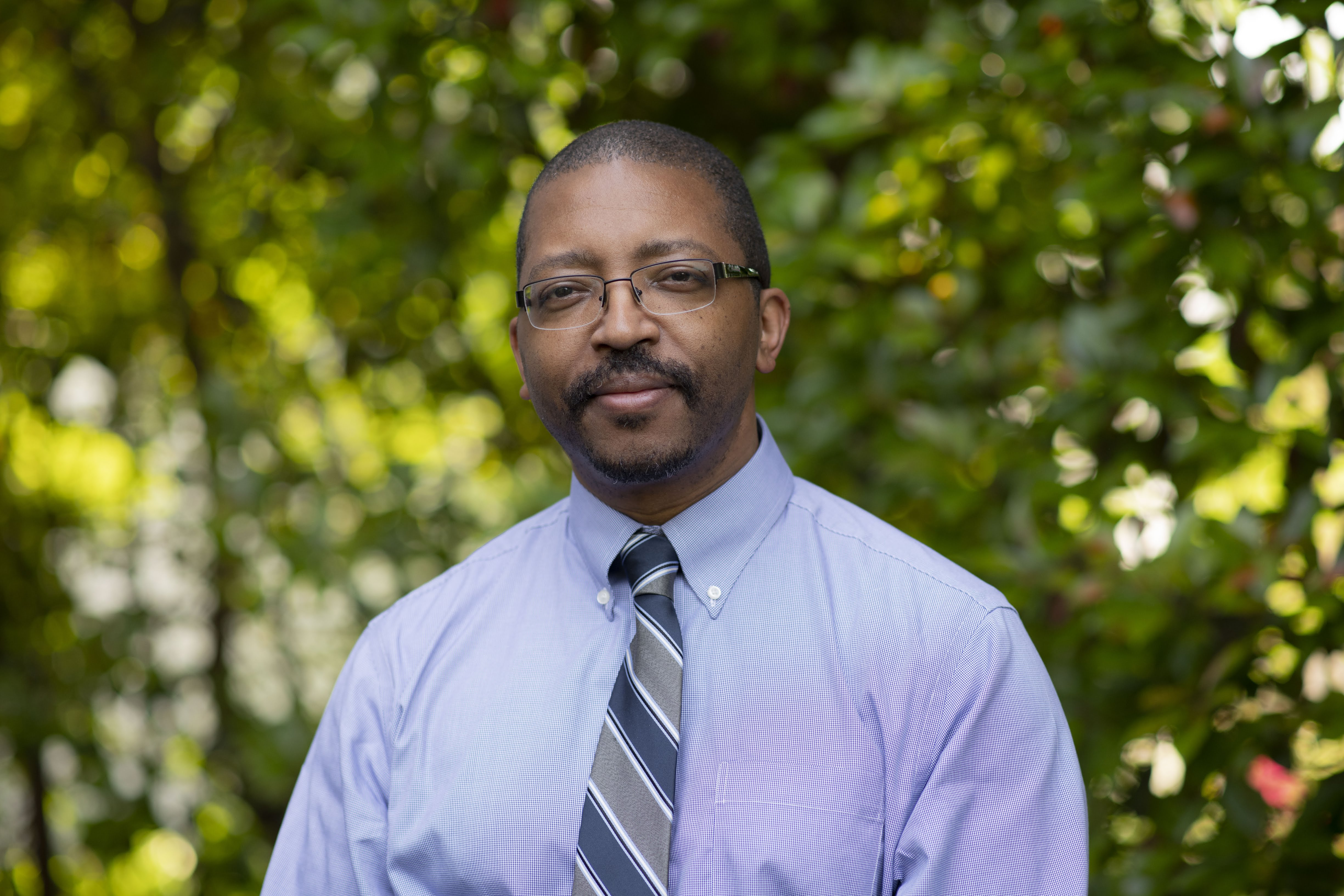
- Harris-Love in 2017
- Born: East Detroit, Michigan, US
- Occupation: Physical therapist

Academic background
- Education: Northern Arizona University (1995); Mayo School of Health Sciences (1997); University of Indianapolis (2004); Georgetown University (2010)

Michael Harris-Love (born 1968), is an American physical therapist, rehabilitation scientist, and academic administrator. He is a professor within the Department of Physical Medicine and Rehabilitation (PM&R) at the University of Colorado School of Medicine, and the inaugural Joanne Posner-Mayer Endowed Chair in Physical Therapy. He also serves as a Health Scientist at the United States Department of Veterans Affairs Eastern Colorado Geriatrics Research, Education, and Clinical Center (GRECC). His research focus is the development of sonographic methods for sarcopenia and myosteatosis screening, and characterizing skeletal muscle adaptations in response to exercise-based interventions in older adults with chronic health conditions. Harris-Love has contributed to the development of the core set measures for international myositis clinical trials as a member of the International Myositis Outcomes Assessment Study Group. As a clinician-investigator at the National Institutes of Health (NIH) Clinical Center, he initiated the development of the Adult Myopathy Assessment Tool. Harris-Love has attained Fellowship status within the Gerontological Society of America and the American Physical Therapy Association (APTA).

== Early life and education ==
Harris-Love was born and raised in the Krainz Woods neighborhood in East Detroit, Michigan. He completed his undergraduate studies at Northern Arizona University (NAU) in Flagstaff, Arizona as a NASA Arizona Space Grant Consortium Intern under the direction of NAU Regents' Professor, Stan L. Lindstedt. Harris-Love received his baccalaureate degree in Exercise Science/Physical Education with honors from Northern Arizona University (NAU) earning the Exercise Science Graduate of the Year award from the NAU College of Health Professions. He earned his master's degree in Physical Therapy from the Mayo School of Health Sciences in Rochester, Minnesota. He completed his doctorate in Health Sciences from the University of Indianapolis. and post-doctoral fellowship (NCR K30) through Georgetown University and Children's National Hospital.

== Federal career ==
Harris-Love has held a variety of positions over the past two decades at medical centers with the Veterans Health Administration and at the NIH Clinical Center in Bethesda, Maryland.

He joined the NIH Clinical Center PT Section as a Staff Physical Therapist and progressed to the role of Rheumatology Clinical Specialist. He was instrumental in establishing the Strength Assessment Laboratories at both the Mark O. Hatfield Clinical Research Center and the Washington DC VAMC Clinical Research Center following their construction in 2004 and 2015, respectively. He served as co-investigator within the Intramural Research Program (NIH IRP) at the NIH Clinical Center in support of clinical and research activities at NIEHS, NIAMS, NINDS, and NHGRI. Harris-Love led the development of the Adult Myopathy Assessment Tool (AMAT) to provide a battery for the assessment of functional performance and observed muscle endurance for individuals with intrinsic muscle disease. The AMAT continues to be used in the NIH IRP and it has been featured in multiple NIH-sponsored clinical trials. He was also the primary research physical therapist for the Rituximab in Myositis Study which featured 31 international sites with 20 adult and 11 pediatric centers (cited > 680 times as of April 2024). Based on his research contributions to the field of idiopathic inflammatory myopathies, Harris-Love was appointed as the first physical therapist to serve on the Myositis Association's Medical Advisory Board in 2005.

Harris-Love is the Director of the Muscle Morphology, Mechanics, and Performance Laboratory (3MAP Lab), founding the group in 2013 at the Washington DC VAMC jointly with the Research Service and Geriatrics and Extended Care Service. The laboratory group's research contributions at the medical center included raising sarcopenia awareness through publications focused on federal healthcare and presenting a VA Center for Innovation project (with the San Francisco VA Medical Center) regarding sarcopenia screening in VA Renal Clinics to VA Under Secretary for Health, David Shulkin, and other VHA staff. Harris-Love was the founding co-director for the Rehabilitation Research Fellowship Program at the Washington DC VAMC, and he later served as the associate director of the Human Performance Research Unit within the DC VAMC Clinical Research Center. His national-level service during this time included his appointment to the Geriatrics Research, Education, and Clinical Center Advisory Subcommittee for the Department of Veterans Affairs, as well as his elected position as Vice-Chair of the Degenerative Diseases Special Interest Group within the APTA Neurology Section.

== Academic career ==
Harris-Love served as a physical therapist at the Clinic Hospital Methodist Campus and St. Marys Campus, and then in the Rehabilitation Medicine Department at the NIH Clinical Center, prior to his academic appointment at George Washington University (GW) in Washington, DC. He initially served as core faculty for the Program in Physical Therapy at the GW School of Medicine and Health Sciences, and later was appointed as an Associate Clinical Professor within the Department of Exercise and Nutrition Sciences at the GW Milken Institute School of Public Health. Harris-Love developed a prototype for force-angle feedback augmented diagnostic ultrasound.

In 2019, Harris-Love accepted a Visiting Professor appointment at University of Colorado Anschutz, and succeeded Margaret Schenkman to become the 9th Director in the 71 year-history of the University of Colorado Physical Therapy Program. He prioritized post-professional education as a program goal and worked with faculty to attain accreditation of Physical Therapy Residencies in Orthopaedics with UCHealth and Faculty Development. He also continues his clinical research through his joint appointment with the Rocky Mountain Regional VAMC and the VA Eastern Colorado GRECC. In September of 2024, Dr. Harris-Love was acknowledged for his contributions to Northern Arizona University's College of Human Health and Services, where he earned the Presidents Alumni Award. His role in mentorship of first generation students in Northern Arizona University's physical therapy program, along with his community service efforts for local Colorado schools, and among many other things, were the main proponents in his recognition.

== Selected publications ==
Key publications from Harris-Love and his collaborators have centered on assessing muscle dysfunction, developing clinically viable approaches to quantitative imaging, and applying exercise-based rehabilitation to improve muscle performance:

- Harris-Love, Michael O.; Gonzales, Tomas I.; Wei, Qi; Ismail, Catheeja; Zabal, Johannah; Woletz, Paula; DiPietro, Loretta; Blackman, Marc R. (July 2019). "Association Between Muscle Strength and Modeling Estimates of Muscle Tissue Heterogeneity in Young and Old Adults". Journal of Ultrasound in Medicine. 38 (7): 1757–1768. doi:10.1002/jum.14864. ISSN 0278-4297. PMC 9003580. PMID 30548644.
- Harris-Love, Michael; Avila, Nilo; Adams, Bernadette; Zhou, June; Seamon, Bryant; Ismail, Catheeja; Zaidi, Syed; Kassner, Courtney; Liu, Frank; Blackman, Marc (2018-10-10). "The Comparative Associations of Ultrasound and Computed Tomography Estimates of Muscle Quality with Physical Performance and Metabolic Parameters in Older Men". Journal of Clinical Medicine. 7 (10): 340. doi:10.3390/jcm7100340. ISSN 2077-0383. PMC 6210142. PMID 30308959.
- Harris-Love, Michael O.; Seamon, Bryant A.; Gonzales, Tomas I.; Hernandez, Haniel J.; Pennington, Donte; Hoover, Brian M. (2017-02-23). "Eccentric Exercise Program Design: A Periodization Model for Rehabilitation Applications". Frontiers in Physiology. 8: 112. doi:10.3389/fphys.2017.00112. ISSN 1664-042X. PMC 5322206. PMID 28280471.
- Correa-de-Araujo, Rosaly; Harris-Love, Michael O.; Miljkovic, Iva; Fragala, Maren S.; Anthony, Brian W.; Manini, Todd M. (2017-02-15). "The Need for Standardized Assessment of Muscle Quality in Skeletal Muscle Function Deficit and Other Aging-Related Muscle Dysfunctions: A Symposium Report". Frontiers in Physiology. 8: 87. doi:10.3389/fphys.2017.00087. ISSN 1664-042X. PMC 5310167. PMID 28261109.
- Harris-Love, Michael O.; Joe, Galen; Davenport, Todd E.; Koziol, Deloris; Abbett Rose, Kristen; Shrader, Joseph A.; Vasconcelos, Olavo M.; McElroy, Beverly; Dalakas, Marinos C. (April 2015). "Reliability of the Adult Myopathy Assessment Tool in Individuals With Myositis". Arthritis Care & Research. 67 (4): 563–570. doi:10.1002/acr.22473. ISSN 2151-464X. PMC 4450351. PMID 25201624.
- Harris-Love, M. O.; Shrader, J. A.; Koziol, D.; Pahlajani, N.; Jain, M.; Smith, M.; Cintas, H. L.; McGarvey, C. L.; James-Newton, L.; Pokrovnichka, A.; Moini, B.; Cabalar, I.; Lovell, D. J.; Wesley, R.; Plotz, P. H. (February 2009). "Distribution and severity of weakness among patients with polymyositis, dermatomyositis and juvenile dermatomyositis". Rheumatology. 48 (2): 134–139. doi:10.1093/rheumatology/ken441. ISSN 1462-0332. PMC 2634286. PMID 19074186.
