= Fitzsimons station =

Light rail station in Aurora, Colorado

Fitzsimons
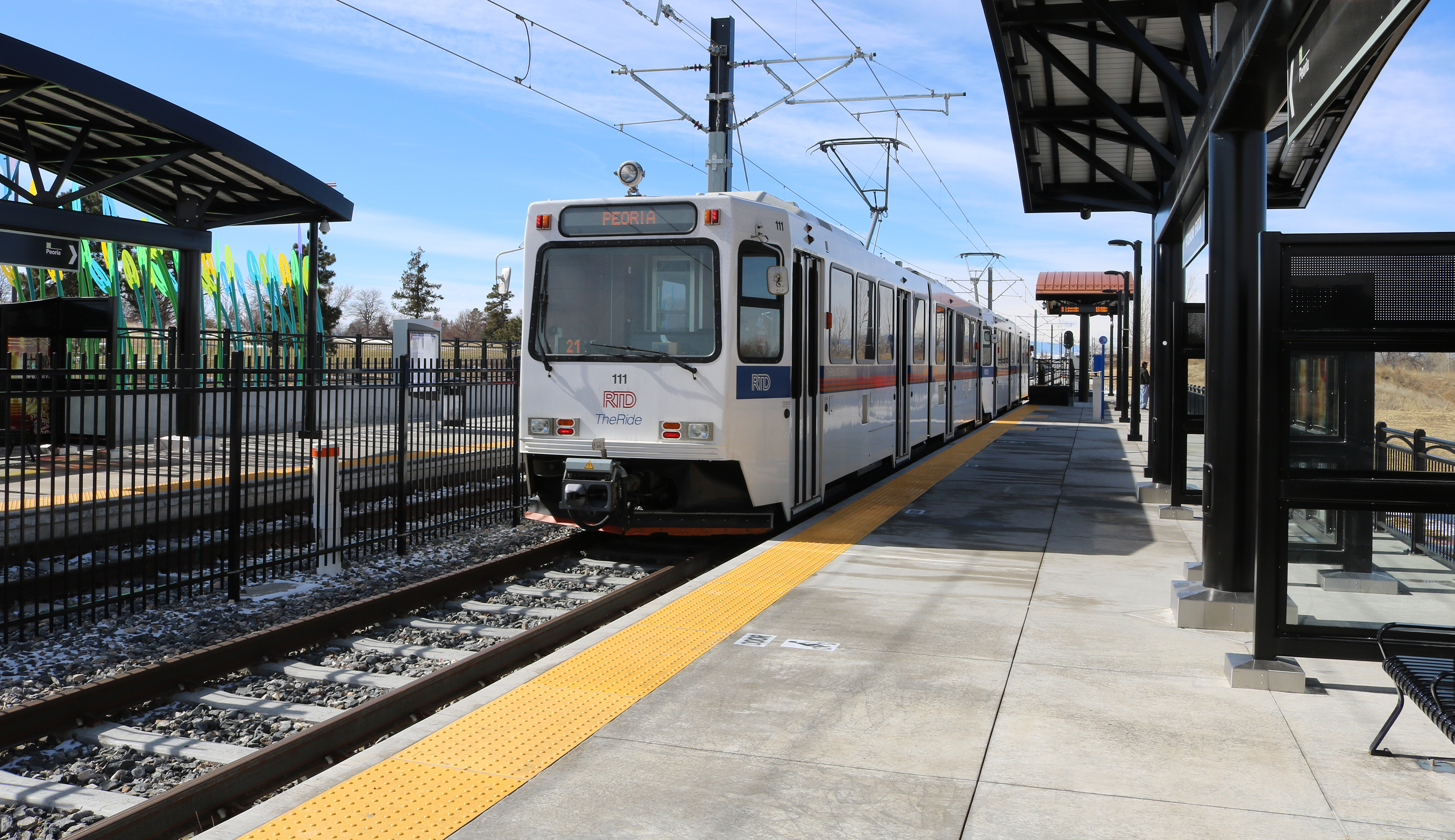
- The station in February 2017.

General information
- Location: 2550 North Fitzsimons Parkway; Aurora, Colorado
- Coordinates: 39°45′17.9″N 104°50′25.7″W
- Owner: Regional Transportation District
- Line: I-225 Corridor
- Platforms: 2 side platforms
- Tracks: 2
- Connections: RTD Bus: Anschutz Shuttle

Construction
- Structure type: At-grade
- Cycle facilities: 12 racks
- Accessible: Yes

History
- Opened: February 24, 2017

Passengers
- 2025: 185 (average daily)
- Rank: 70 out of 75

Services
Preceding station	RTD	Following station
Peoria Terminus	R Line	Colfax toward RidgeGate Parkway
Location

Fitzsimons station is a Regional Transportation District (RTD) light rail station on the R Line in Aurora, Colorado. The station is located along the north side of Fitzsimons Parkway along Sand Creek Park, and serves the University of Colorado Anschutz. The station opened on February 24, 2017, along with the rest of the R Line.

== History ==
The station was one of two planned in 2001 on the former Fitzsimons Army Medical Center, an area that Fitzsimons Redevelopment Authority developed into a campus anchored by the then-University of Colorado Health Sciences Center. The second station planned for the former Fitzsimons Army Medical Center became Colfax station.

The R Line was approved as part of the 2004 FasTracks ballot measure, which planned to build a light rail line along Interstate 225 in Aurora. As part of the light rail line, a station at Fitzsimons Commons near the Anschutz Medical Campus was planned along Montview Boulevard at Uvalda Street, and was initially named Montview.

In May 2013, the University of Colorado requested that the light rail station be moved off of its campus due to concerns that vibrations and electromagnetic interference generated by trains would interfere with research equipment. The proposed $20 million in mitigation would have included construction of a floating rail bed and replacement of new equipment in the research labs. On June 25, 2013, the RTD Board of Directors approved the realignment of the light rail line onto Fitzsimons Boulevard, with a new station north of the campus. The relocated station required the acquisition of land from Sand Creek Park, which underwent $3 million in renovations alongside light rail construction in 2015.

== Station layout ==
1F

Platform Level

Sand Creek Park
Side platform, doors will open on the right
Northbound
← toward Peoria (Terminus)
Southbound
toward RidgeGate Parkway (Colfax) →
Side platform, doors will open on the right
Fitzsimons Parkway; CU Anschutz

The station is located on the north side of Fitzsimons Parkway and is accessible from Sand Creek Park. The University of Colorado Anschutz is located across Fitzsimons Parkway and is accessible via shuttle bus. There is no parking at the station, and there are no other fixed route bus connections. A park-and-ride garage was proposed at the station in 2013, but was not built.

== Transit-oriented development ==
Fitzsimons station is located to the north of the Fitzsimons Life Science District and Fitzsimons Innovation District, a 150-acre (61 ha) transit-oriented development that surrounds the Anschutz Medical Campus. The city of Aurora plans to build housing, hotels and office space on the land between the station and medical campus, including redevelopment of the Fitzsimons Golf Course.
