= Mdina Glass =

Maltese glassmaking company

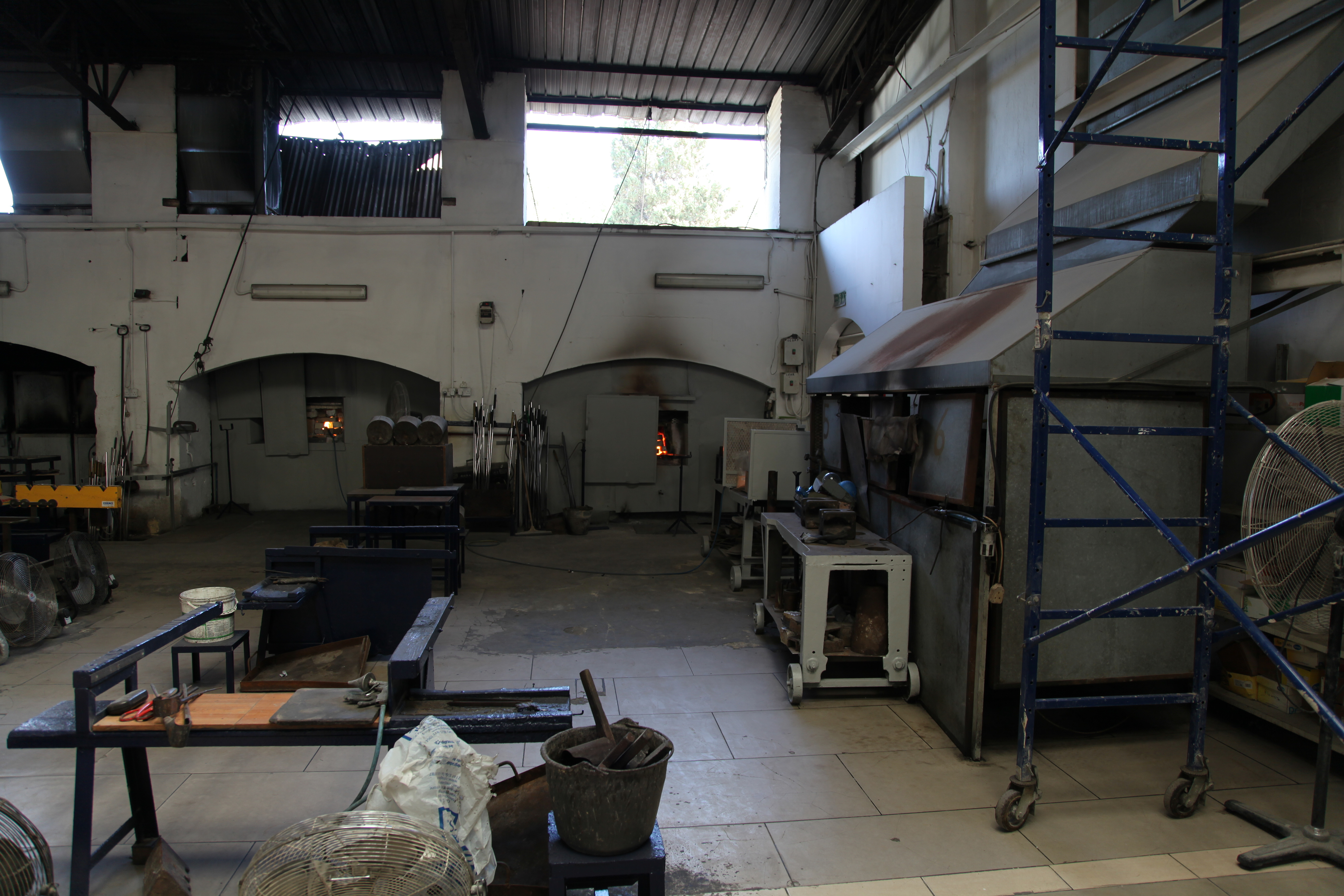
Mdina Glass workshop

Mdina Glass is a manufacturer of glassware, based in Malta. It was founded in 1968 by Michael Harris, a lecturer in industrial glass design at the Royal College of Art. Attracted by various government incentives offered by newly independent Malta, Eric Dobson and Michael Harris (Royal College of Art colleagues) ventured out to Mediterranean island from the UK with the aim of opening Malta's first ever glassware manufacturer. The company, Maltese Glass Industries (which soon changed to Mdina Glass), became an active glassmaking company in 1968. Mdina Glass was an instant success and soon the company was taking on local trainees to learn the craft. One of these trainees was Joseph Said, quickly impressing Harris and Dobson with his natural abilities in glassmaking. In 1971, two Italian maestros, the father and son team of Vincente and Ettore Boffo joined Mdina Glass to introduce Italian glassmaking techniques. Following independence from the UK in 1964, the Maltese government offered incentives for skilled workers and entrepreneurs from outside the island, in order to build up the industrial and commercial sectors of the economy. This included a 10-year tax holiday. Due to personal reasons, Harris left Mdina Glass in 1973, leaving Eric Dobson alone at the helm and by 1975, once promising trainee Joseph Said had climbed the ranks to become the company's Production Manager, acting as a catalyst for a number of changes, revolutionising the way the company operated and what it produced. At the end of 1967 Harris and Eric Dobson, another lecturer from the RCA, imported glassmaking equipment to Malta, and set up Maltese Glass Industries. In 1985 Eric Dobson chose to relinquish control of Mdina Glass and return to the UK. The company wasn't doing as well as it had done in previous years. Joseph Said took over and, under his control, the company went through some quick changes to remedy the commercial situation in challenging times.

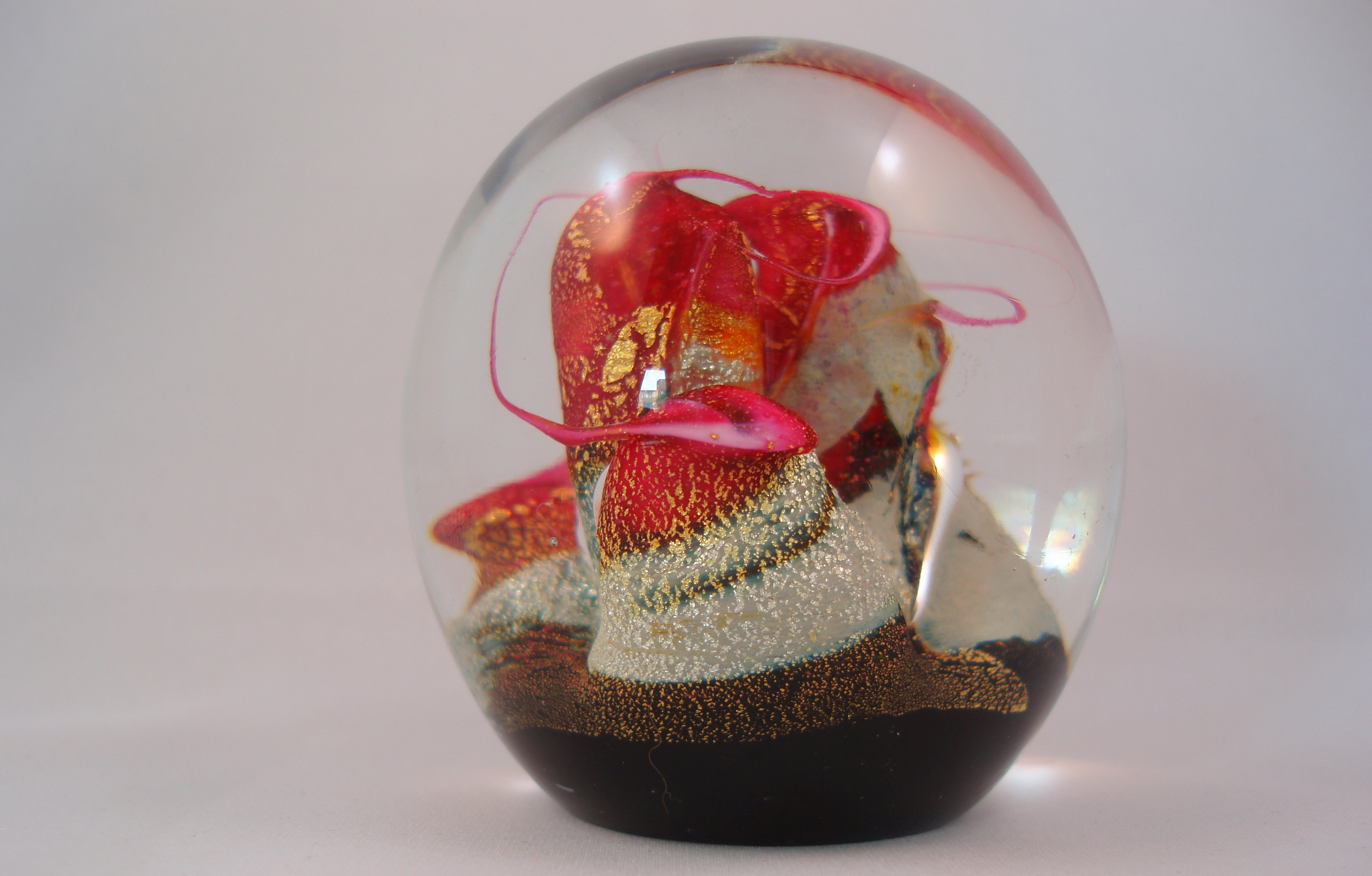
Paperweight

Further significant changes in glassmaking techniques, production processes and product range marked the 1990s. Basic raw materials were changed for those of a much higher quality. In 1990, Mdina Glass introduced lampworking techniques to Malta, and by 1995 its artisans were also honing their skills in applying the newly introduced fusion techniques to a whole new range of products. Harris trained a number of Maltese nationals as glassmakers, employing around 15 people when the firm became established. His first apprentice, Joseph Said, took over Mdina Glass (as it became known) after Harris left in 1973. Joseph Said's children Olivia, Nevise, Pamela and Alan now form an integral part of the company, which employs around 50 people, from glassmakers, sales staff in the various outlets and administration. Olivia Said now holds the position of Production and Product Design Manager. In 2012 Mdina Glass was invited to participate in an exhibition at Harrods, London entitled ‘This Is Malta’. Mdina Glass has also won the National Artisan Award over two consecutive years.
