= Colorado School of Public Health =

U.S. school of public health

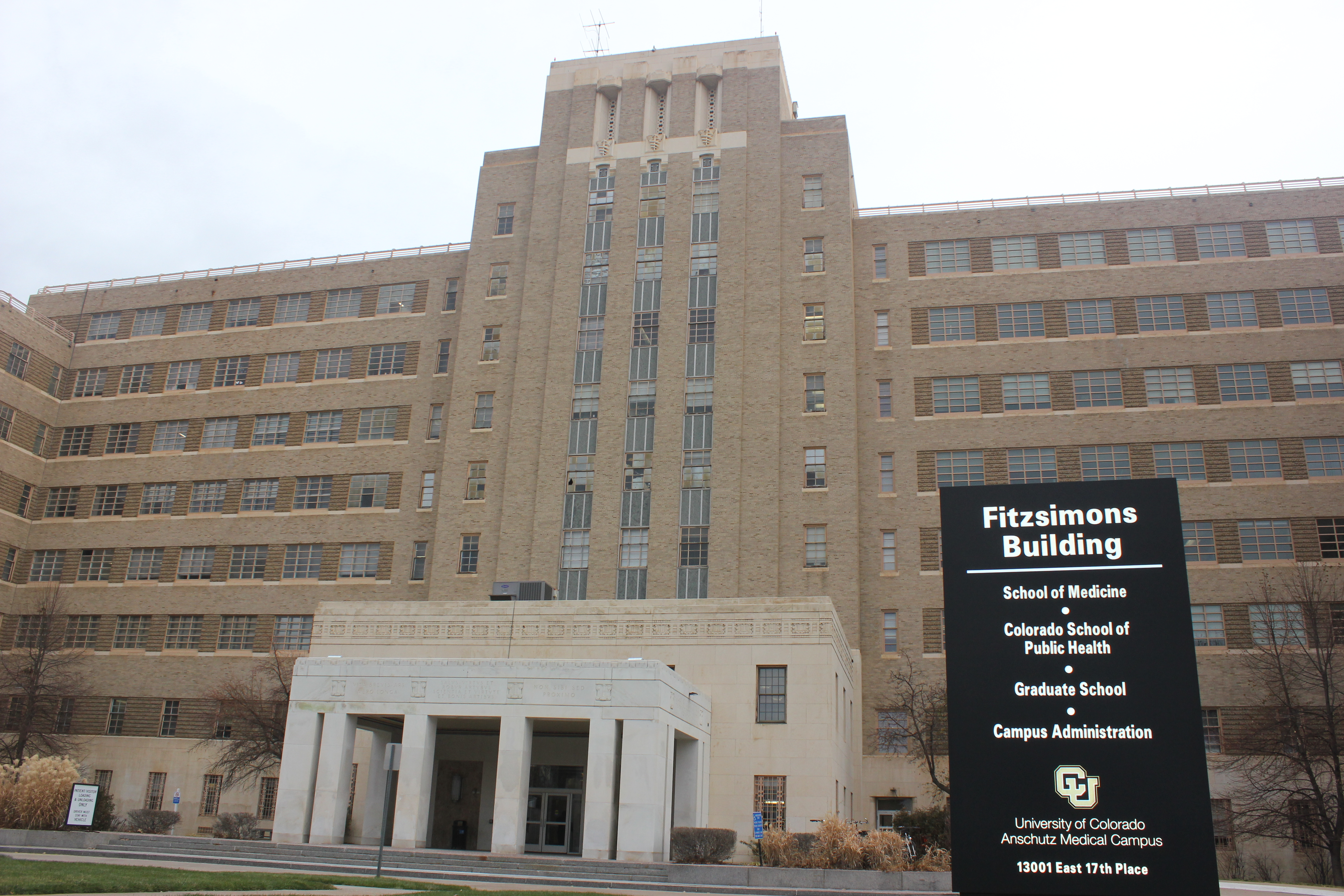
The historic Fitzsimons Army Hospital, home to the administrative units of the Colorado School of Public Health and University of Colorado School of Medicine on the CU Anschutz Medical Campus in Aurora, Colorado.

The Colorado School of Public Health is a collaborative school of public health representing three Colorado public educational and research institutions: the University of Colorado, Colorado State University and the University of Northern Colorado. The school is accredited by the Council on Education for Public Health. The school operates on three university campuses: the University of Colorado Anschutz Medical Campus in Aurora, Colorado, Colorado State University in Fort Collins, Colorado, and the University of Northern Colorado in Greeley, Colorado.

== History ==
The school officially opened on July 1, 2008, following decades of dedicated development. Planning for the school was initiated by a partnership of public health practitioners, academics, and business leaders. The partnership formed an official taskforce in 2002 in order to develop a strategic plan and seek the funding necessary to open a school of public health. The task force was successful and instrumental in the decision to open the school as a collaboration. In August 2007, each university president or chancellor signed a memorandum of agreement to open the school and the founding dean was appointed that December. Within months the school admitted its first class of students, setting the stage for growth future development. Among those developments, the school received full accreditation from the Council on Education for Public Health October 2010, and was reaccredited in September 2015.

Today the school enrolls nearly 600 students, with over 200 full-time faculty across the three university campuses, and more than 2,600 alumni. The organization establishes partnerships to develop its regional and global health initiatives.

In 2018, the Colorado School of Public Health (ColoradoSPH) celebrated its 10th anniversary.

=== Deans ===
- Richard F. Hamman, MD, DrPH (Founding Dean, December 2007 – December 2010)
- Judith Albino, PhD (Interim Dean, January 2011 – May 2012)
- David C. Goff, Jr, MD, PhD (June 2012 – November 2016)
- Elaine Morrato, DrPH, MPH, CPH (Interim Dean, December 2016 - September 2017)
- Jonathan M. Samet, MD, MS (October 2017 – August 2023)
- Cathy Bradley, PhD (August 2023 - Present)

== Campus ==
The school operates on three university campuses: the University of Colorado Anschutz Medical Campus in Aurora, Colorado, Colorado State University in Fort Collins, Colorado, and the University of Northern Colorado in Greeley, Colorado.

== Academics ==
=== Degrees ===
The Colorado School of Public Health offers degrees in Master of Public Health, Master of Science, Doctor of Public Health, and Doctor of Philosophy. It has to five academic departments:

- Biostatistics and Informatics
- Community and Behavioral Health
- Environmental and Occupational Health
- Epidemiology
- Health Systems, Management and Policy

=== Academic centers ===
- Centers for American Indian & Alaska Native Health
- Center for Global Health
- Center for Health, Work & Environment
- Center for Innovative Design & Analysis
- Center for Public Health Practice
- Colorado Integrated Food Safety Center of Excellence
- Injury & Violence Prevention Center
- Latino Research & Policy Center
- Lifecourse Epidemiology of Adiposity & Diabetes Center
- Rocky Mountain Prevention & Research Center
- Rocky Mountain Public Health Training Center

=== Accreditation ===
The school is accredited by the Council on Education for Public Health.
