= Michael Harris (glassworker) =

Michael Harris (1933-1994), was an English glassworker.

Michael set up Mdina Glass on the island of Malta in 1968. He, his wife and their two young sons left Malta in 1972 and founded their Isle of Wight Studio. Isle of Wight Studio Glass (est. 1973) is the oldest continuously operating studio glass brand under its original founding name in the UK, today it continues to be run by 2nd Generation Master Glassmaker Timothy Harris. Source: Mark Hill, Michael Harris: Mdina Glass & Isle of Wight Studio Glass." In 1989 Michael with the help of Timothy Harris his eldest son started Gozo Glass on Gozo, an island near Malta, a business still operating today.
