= Single-occupancy vehicle =

A single-occupancy vehicle (SOV) is a privately operated vehicle whose only occupant is the driver. The drivers of SOVs use their vehicles primarily for personal travel, daily commuting and for running errands. The types of vehicles include, but are not limited to, sport utility vehicles (SUVs), light-duty trucks, and any combination thereof, along with all the various van and car sizes, but would generally be taken to exclude human-powered vehicles such as bicycles. This term is used by transportation engineers and planners. SOVs contrast with high-occupancy vehicles (HOV), which have two or more occupants. Keep in mind that SOV in this context refers to a status and usage, not the vehicle type.

== See also ==
- Carpool
