= University of Colorado Anschutz =

University of Colorado's health sciences-related schools and colleges

Coordinates: 39°44′42.37″N 104°50′15.8″W

- The seal of The University of Colorado
- Motto: Let Your Light Shine; Ancient Greek: λαμψάτω τὸ φῶς ὑμῶν, romanized: lampsátō tò phō̃s humō̃n
- Type: Public
- Established: 2006
- Parent institution: University of Colorado system
- Chancellor: Don Elliman
- President: Todd Saliman
- Students: 4,698 (Fall 2026)
- Undergraduates: 545 (Fall 2026)
- Postgraduates: 4,153 (Fall 2026)
- Location: Aurora, Colorado, United States
- Colors: Silver, black, and gold
- Website: www.cuanschutz.edu
- Research grants: US $516 million

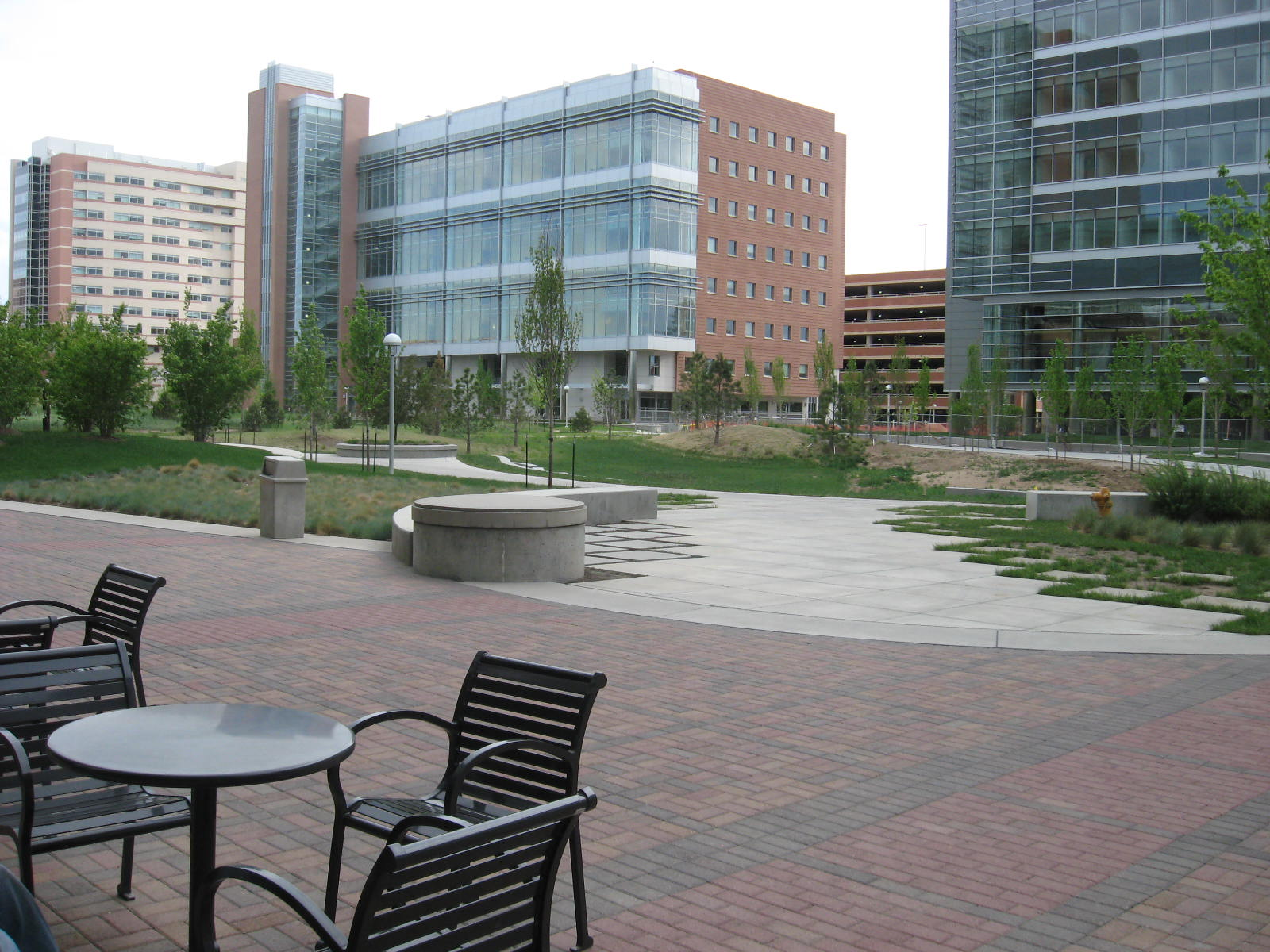
A view of the CU Anschutz campus; UCHealth University of Colorado Hospital can be seen near the top left corner

The University of Colorado Anschutz is the academic health sciences campus in Aurora, Colorado, that houses the University of Colorado's six health sciences-related schools and colleges, including the University of Colorado School of Medicine, the CU Anschutz Skaggs School of Pharmacy and Pharmaceutical Sciences, the CU Anschutz College of Nursing, the CU Anschutz School of Dental Medicine, and the Colorado School of Public Health, as well as the graduate school for various fields in the biological and biomedical sciences. The campus also includes the 184-acre (0.74 km^{2}) Fitzsimons Innovation Community, UCHealth University of Colorado Hospital, Children's Hospital Colorado, the Rocky Mountain Regional Veterans Affairs hospital, and a residential/retail town center known as 21 Fitzsimons. CU Anschutz is the largest academic health center in the Rocky Mountain region.

The campus is located on a portion of the former Fitzsimons Army Medical Center. After the base was decommissioned in 1999, the campus became known as the Fitzsimons Medical Campus, or simply "Fitzsimons," and adopted its current name in 2006 after the Anschutz family donated $91 million to construct the Anschutz Centers for Advanced Medicine, which include the Anschutz Outpatient and Cancer Pavilions, and the Anschutz Inpatient Pavilion.

== History ==
=== University of Colorado Health Sciences Center ===
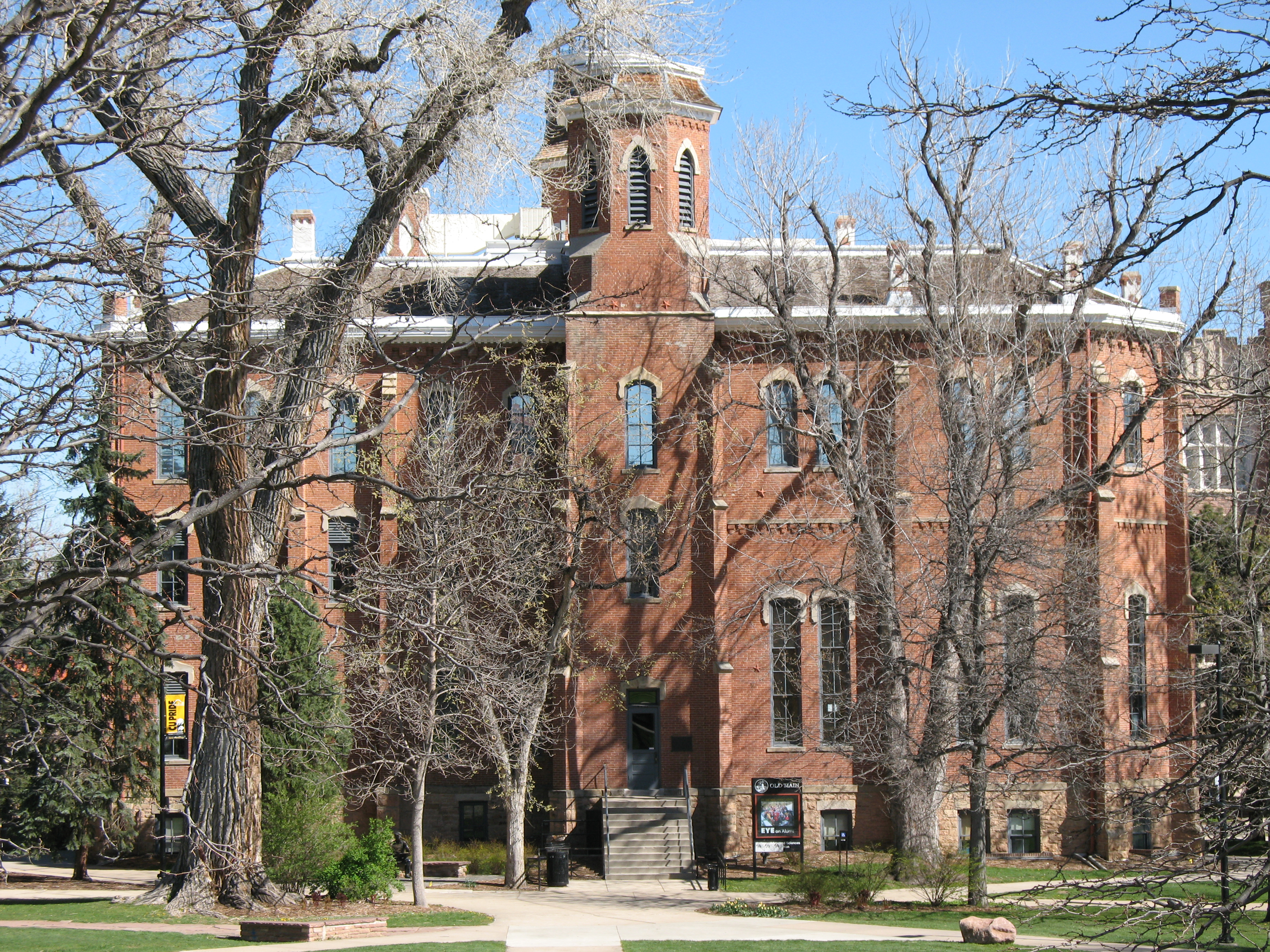
Old Main in Boulder, where the School of Medicine first started

The University of Colorado created the Department of Medicine and Surgery in September 1883 in the Old Main building on the Boulder campus. This department granted its first degrees in 1885.

By 1892, the last two years of classes were taught in Denver because the larger population afforded more practical experience. This triggered a turf battle with the private medical school at the University of Colorado Denver School of Medicine, and the resulting legal battle went all the way to the Supreme Court of Colorado. In 1897, the Supreme Court found that the charter of the University of Colorado restricted it to teaching in Boulder.

Then in 1910, University of Colorado persuaded the legislature to amend the state constitution, allowing the university to move its medical school back to Denver. In 1911, the School of Medicine merged with the private Denver and Gross Medical College to form a larger school with a more comprehensive program, thus paving the way for the medical school to move permanently to Denver.

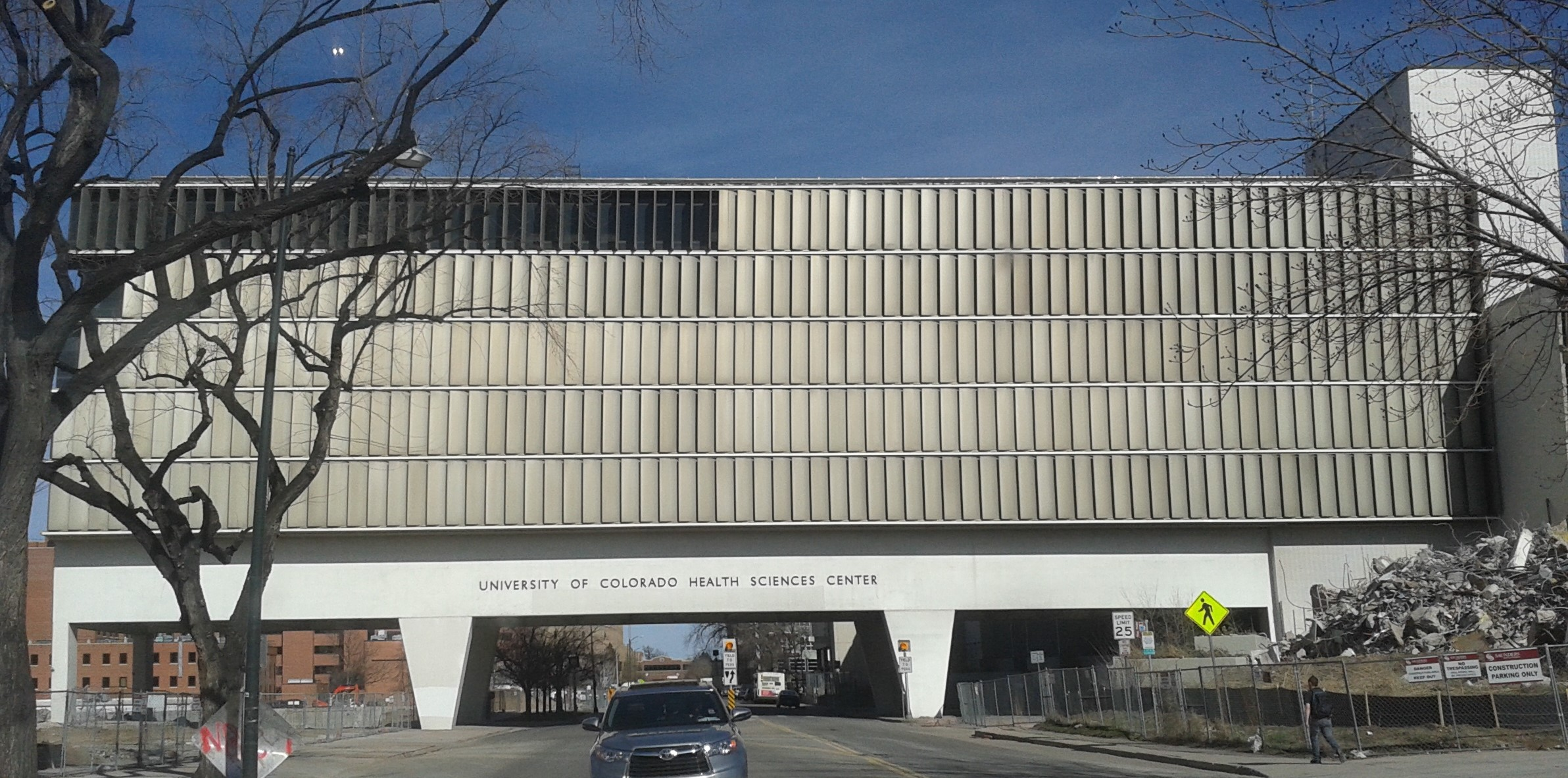
The abandoned University of Colorado Health Sciences Center over E. 9th Ave. in April 2016

In 1925, the U.C. School of Medicine moved to a campus on 9th Avenue and Colorado Boulevard in Denver. This eventually became the modern University of Colorado Health Sciences Center (CU Anschutz in the long run).

In 1947, the University of Colorado Hospital assumed responsibility for patients referred to it from the Denver General Hospital. The state paid for their care, and medical and nursing students got instruction.

In 1995, Fitzsimons Army Medical Center was put on the Base Realignment and Closure list by Congress. Officials from the Health Sciences Center, the University of Colorado Hospital, and the City of Aurora presented a proposal to the Department of Defense to utilize part of the decommissioned Army medical center as an academic health center for the University of Colorado.

In 2004, the first medical school laboratories moved from Denver to the research towers on the Fitzsimons grounds. Then in 2006, the Fitzsimons campus was renamed the "Anschutz Medical Campus" in recognition of the large donations of money from Philip Anschutz and his wife Nancy Anschutz.

By the end of 2008, all of the academic and research operations of the University of Colorado at Denver health sciences schools and colleges had been relocated from their older campus in Denver to the new CU Anschutz Campus, joining the University of Colorado Hospital and the Children's Hospital (Colorado).

=== Merger with the University of Colorado Denver ===
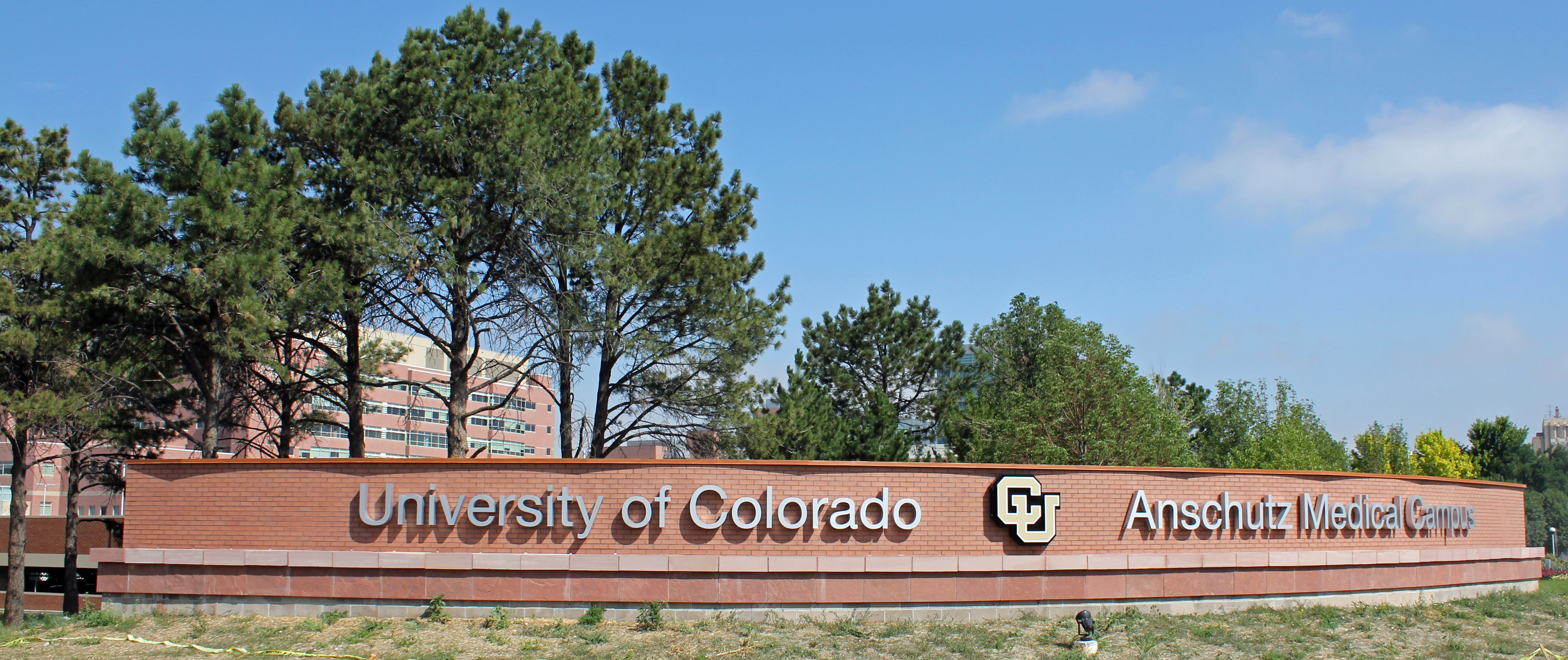
The sign at the campus' main entrance on East Colfax Avenue

In the summer of 2004, the University of Colorado Denver and the University of Colorado Health Sciences Center merged to create the University of Colorado Denver and Health Sciences Center ("UCDHSC"). As a result, the University of Colorado encompassed three institutions, down from four. On October 29, 2007, the board of regents voted to rename UCDHSC as the "University of Colorado Denver." The branding covered both the CU Anschutz Campus and the Denver Campus. This was reportedly a source of frustration for the City of Aurora, whose representatives felt slighted that the location of one of the university's two campuses is not reflected in the university's name. Officials agreed to add "in Aurora" to the "University of Colorado Denver Anschutz Medical Campus", referring only to one half of the university, but this was also considered an unsatisfactory solution, and one state senator proposed the moniker "University of Colorado Denver/Aurora".

In January 2010, the University of Colorado removed the word "Denver" from the campus name, referring to it only as University of Colorado Anschutz Medical Campus. In 2014, the University of Colorado appointed separate chancellors for the University of Colorado Denver and the University of Colorado Anschutz, effectively separating the two campuses. However, the campuses remain administratively consolidated and offer some dual campus programs offered under the moniker University of Colorado Denver | Anschutz Medical Campus or CU Denver/Anschutz for short.

=== University of Colorado Anschutz ===
UCHealth University of Colorado Hospital, a teaching hospital affiliated with the University of Colorado, opened its new $644 million, 820,000-square-foot (76,000 m^{2}) facility at the CU Anschutz Campus in 2007. Children's Hospital Colorado, with 1,400,000 square feet (130,000 m^{2}), opened in 2007 to the south of the campus. U.S. Department of Veteran's Affairs Hospital broke ground in August 2009 but the projected opening date in 2013 was missed. In 2014, the half-finished hospital was hundreds of millions of dollars over budget and the Veterans Administration (VA) was found to have breached its contract with the construction company. The U.S. Civilian Board of Contract Appeals declared the project had grown outside the scope of the Congress-approved budget due to the unrealistic expectations of the VA. In July 2018, following those delays, the Rocky Mountain Regional VA Medical Center opened.

== Academics ==
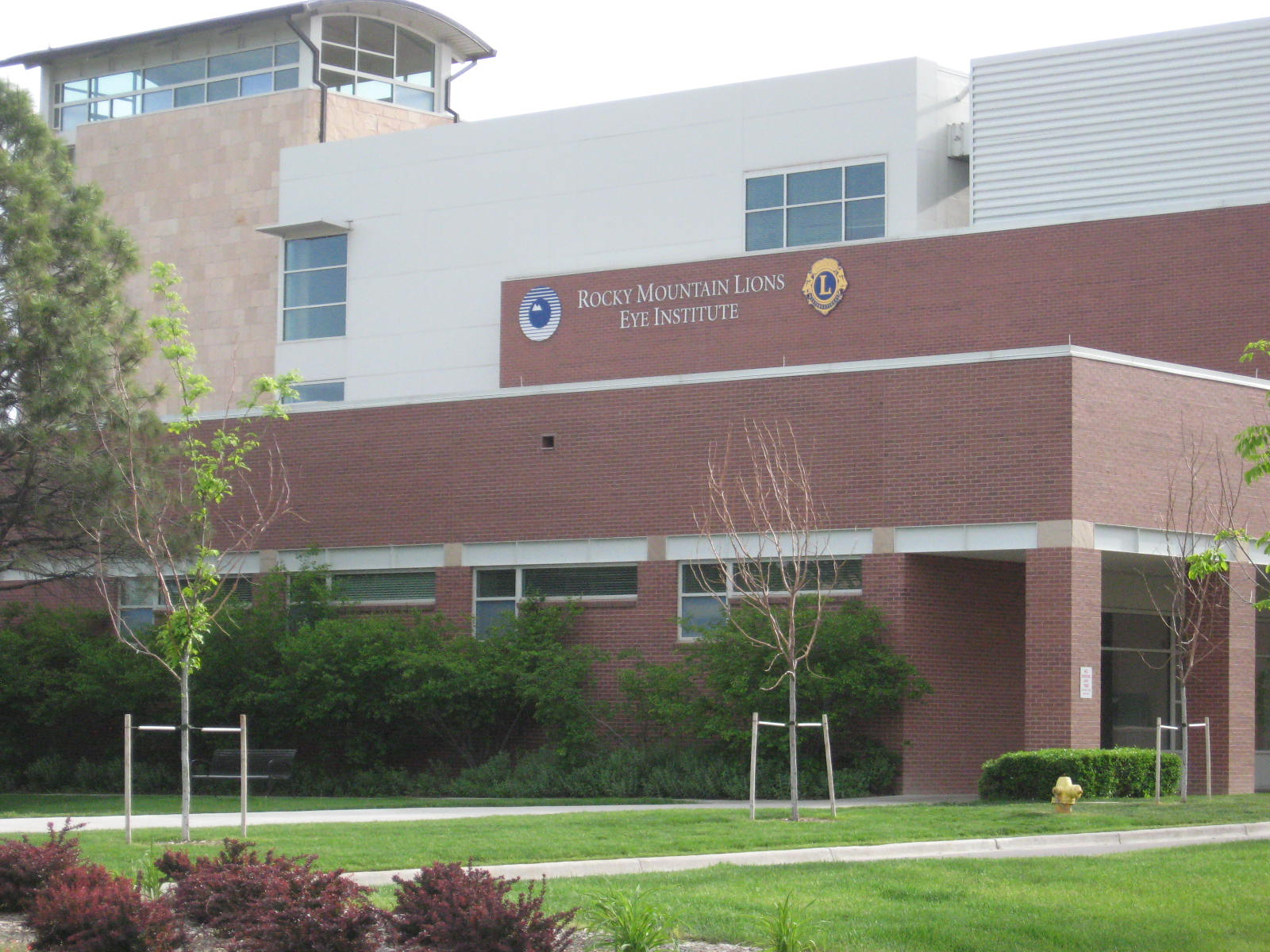
The Rocky Mountain Lions Eye Institute at CU Anschutz houses the Department of Ophthalmology

On the CU Anschutz campus, the University of Colorado houses the University of Colorado School of Dental Medicine, the School of Medicine, the CU College of Nursing, the School of Pharmacy, Colorado School of Public Health, and the Graduate School. CU Anschutz offers 42 degree programs across its six schools and college, and its programs feature highly in various national rankings (see Rankings).

=== School of Pharmacy ===
The CU Anschutz School of Pharmacy (SOP) began in 1911 as a division of the School of Medicine in Boulder. It became an independent college in 1913 and a school in 1957. It received its accreditation in 1938-1939 and awarded a B.S. in Pharmacy degree in 1995-1996 when it received a full accreditation status awarding the Doctor of Pharmacy (PharmD) degree by the ACPE. In 1986, the School of Pharmacy was administratively transferred to the University of Colorado Health Sciences Center in Denver. The physical transfer from Boulder and final consolidation of faculty, staff and students was completed between August and November 1992. In 2008, the school moved to CU Anschutz, and is involved in teaching, research and public/professional service in the practice of pharmacy, the pharmaceutical sciences, molecular toxicology, and pharmaceutical outcomes research. 30% of its class is from out of state. In 2008, the NIH awarded $7,271,657 and $19,056,438 in grants towards the SOP and Pharmacology department, respectively. In the Spring of 2010, the school moved into its new building, the Skaggs School of Pharmacy and Pharmaceutical Sciences also at CU Anschutz.

=== Research ===
In 2007, more than $373 million in research and training grants and contracts was awarded to CU Anschutz researchers. In 2012, more than $179 million was awarded by the National Institutes of Health to CU Anschutz researchers. As of 2018, research grants totaled $553 million. The university is considered by the Carnegie Classification of Institutions of Higher Education to have "very high research activity" with a basic classification of Research Universities (RU/VH) (very high research activity). The core laboratories in the research complex, at CU Anschutz, include mass spectrometry, X-ray crystallography, electron microscopy, a 900 mega-hertz nuclear magnetic resonance (NMR) spectrometer, flow cytometry, DNA array and peptide protein chemistry.

=== Rankings ===
Academic programs on the campus feature in a number of rankings in U.S. News & World Report's America's Best Graduate Schools, 2019. The University of Colorado School of Medicine ranks 6th among American medical schools for Pediatrics, 7th for Family Medicine, 12th for primary care, and 30th among medical schools for research. The Physicians Assistant's Program ranks 7th, with Online Nursing ranked 4th, the Physical Therapy Program ranks 11th, and the Colorado School of Public Health ranked 16th. Other nursing programs, for masters and Doctor of Nursing practice are ranked 49th, and 41st respectively.

== Campus ==
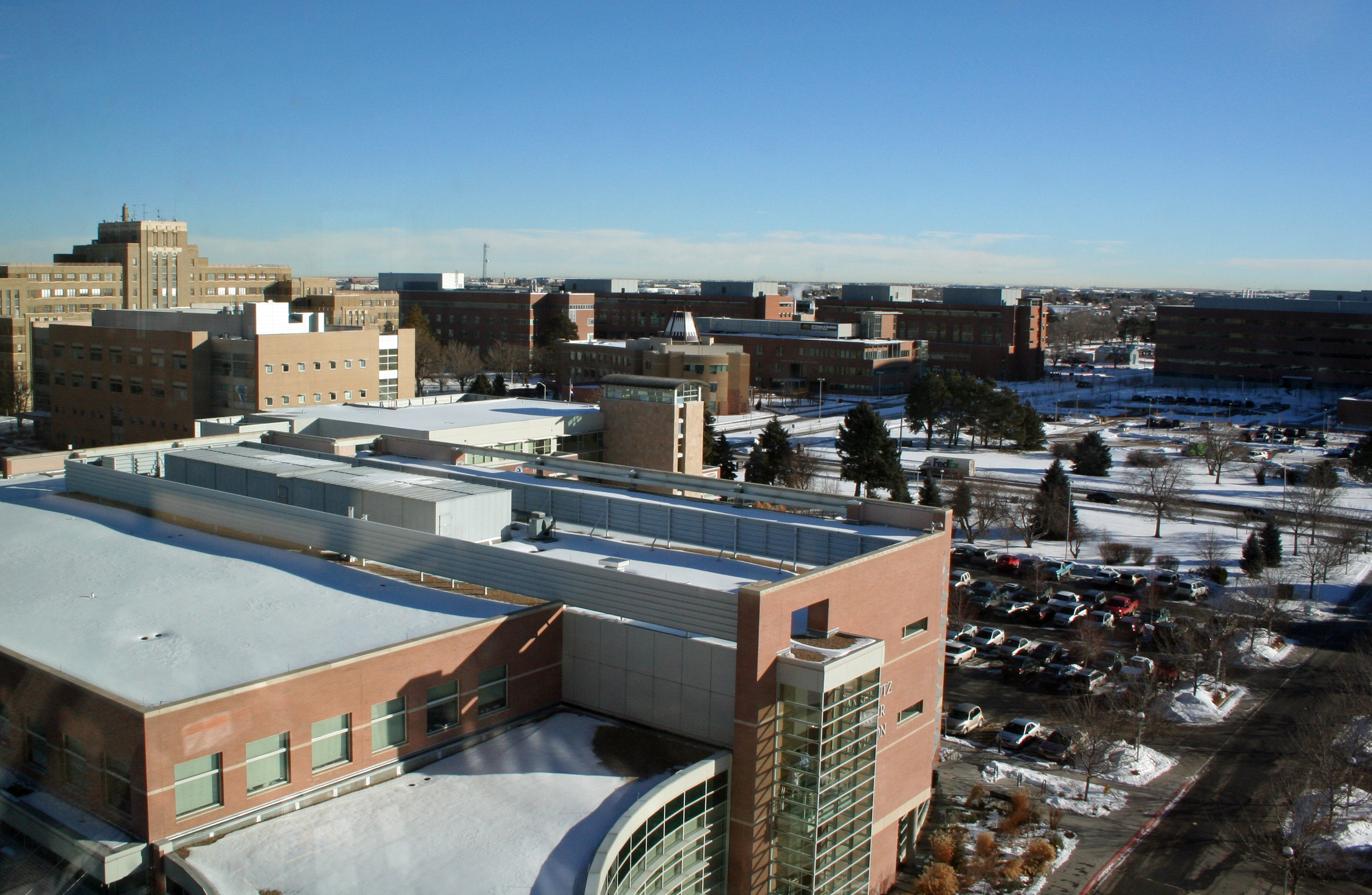
A view of CU Anschutz from the 7th floor of the Anschutz Outpatient Pavillon, looking northeast

The Anschutz campus hosts administrative and teaching functions, as well as clinical and research programs with nearly 25,000 faculty, employees, and support staff. The principal buildings on campus include the Fitzsimons Building (formerly Building 500), two Research Complex towers, two education buildings, the Fulginiti Pavilion for Bioethics and Humanities, the Barbara Davis Diabetes Center, the Nighthorse Campbell Native Health Building, Strauss Health Sciences Library, the Anschutz Health and Wellness Center, as well as the individual buildings for the Skaggs School of Pharmacy and Pharmaceutical Sciences, and the School of Dental Medicine. The Children's Hospital and the University of Colorado Hospital are located to the south of the campus. The north part of campus consists of two bioscience buildings, which includes the Gates Biomanufacturing Facility. The campus is served by two stations on the RTD R Line, Fitzsimons station and Colfax station.

=== Enrollment ===
There are 4,326 students enrolled at University of Colorado Anschutz as of Fall 2018. Of these, 528 are undergraduate students (15% male, 85% female), 3,798 are graduate or enrolled in first professional courses (33% male, 66% female). 27% of the student population at the CU Anschutz are students of color. There are approximately 729 medical students, 455 dental students, 1,092 graduate students, 499 nursing students, 697 pharmacy students, and 498 public health students.

=== Strauss Health Sciences Library ===
The library at CU Anschutz is the largest health sciences library in Colorado, with more than 32,000 e-journals. The library opened in late 2007 with 2 Information Commons, 30 group study rooms, and wireless internet connectivity throughout the library. The facility includes collection storage with a reading room as well as indoor and outdoor private and team study spaces, administrative offices, reference services, classrooms, a conference center, a learning resource center, systems-database support, education and health informatics support, and a rare materials collection. In fall 2018, the library was renamed to the Strauss Health Sciences Library, to recognize 1951 pharmacy alumni and philanthropist Henry L. Strauss.

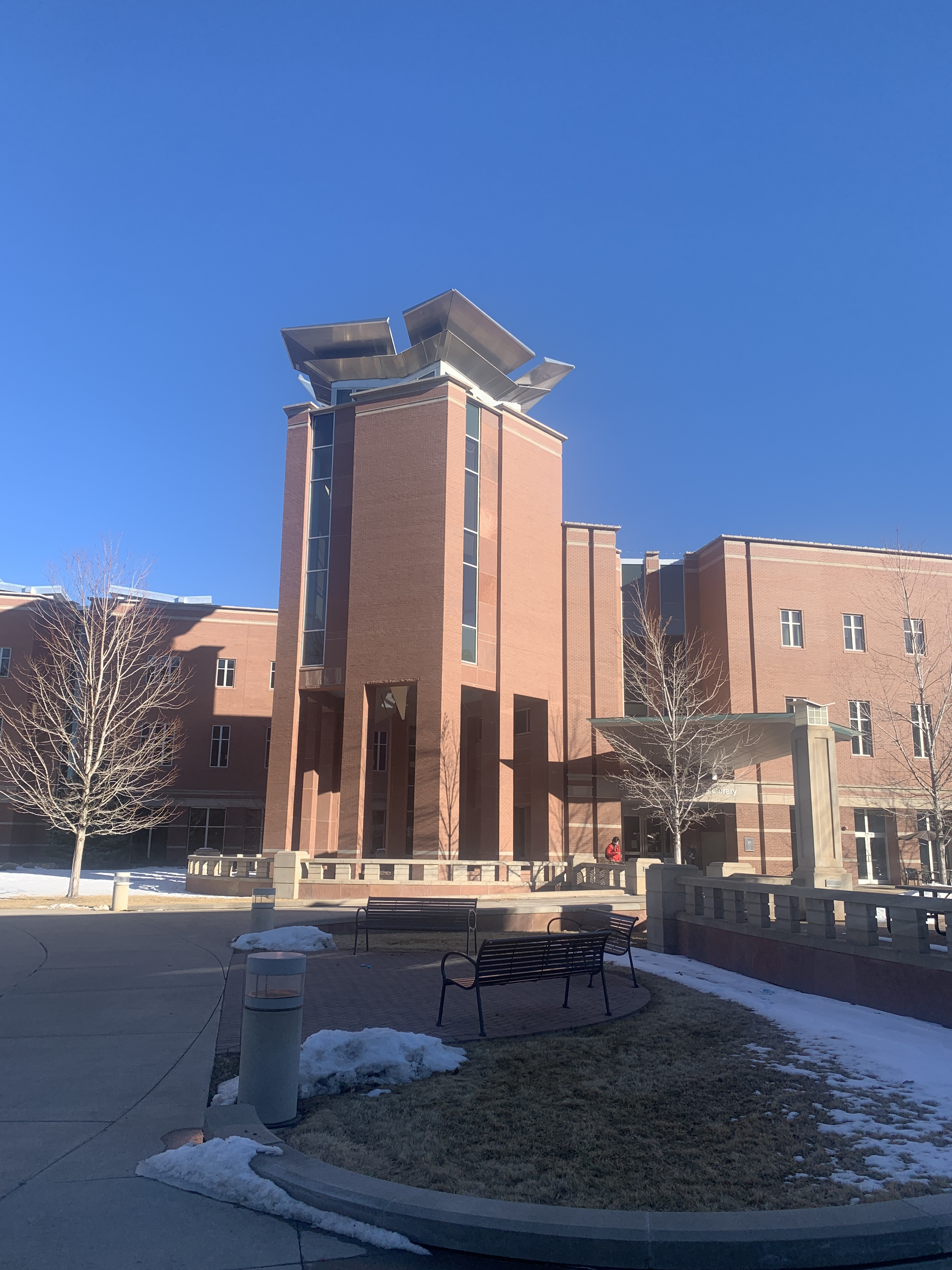
Strauss Health Sciences Library at the University of Colorado Anschutz Medical Campus in Aurora, Colorado

=== Architecture and layout ===
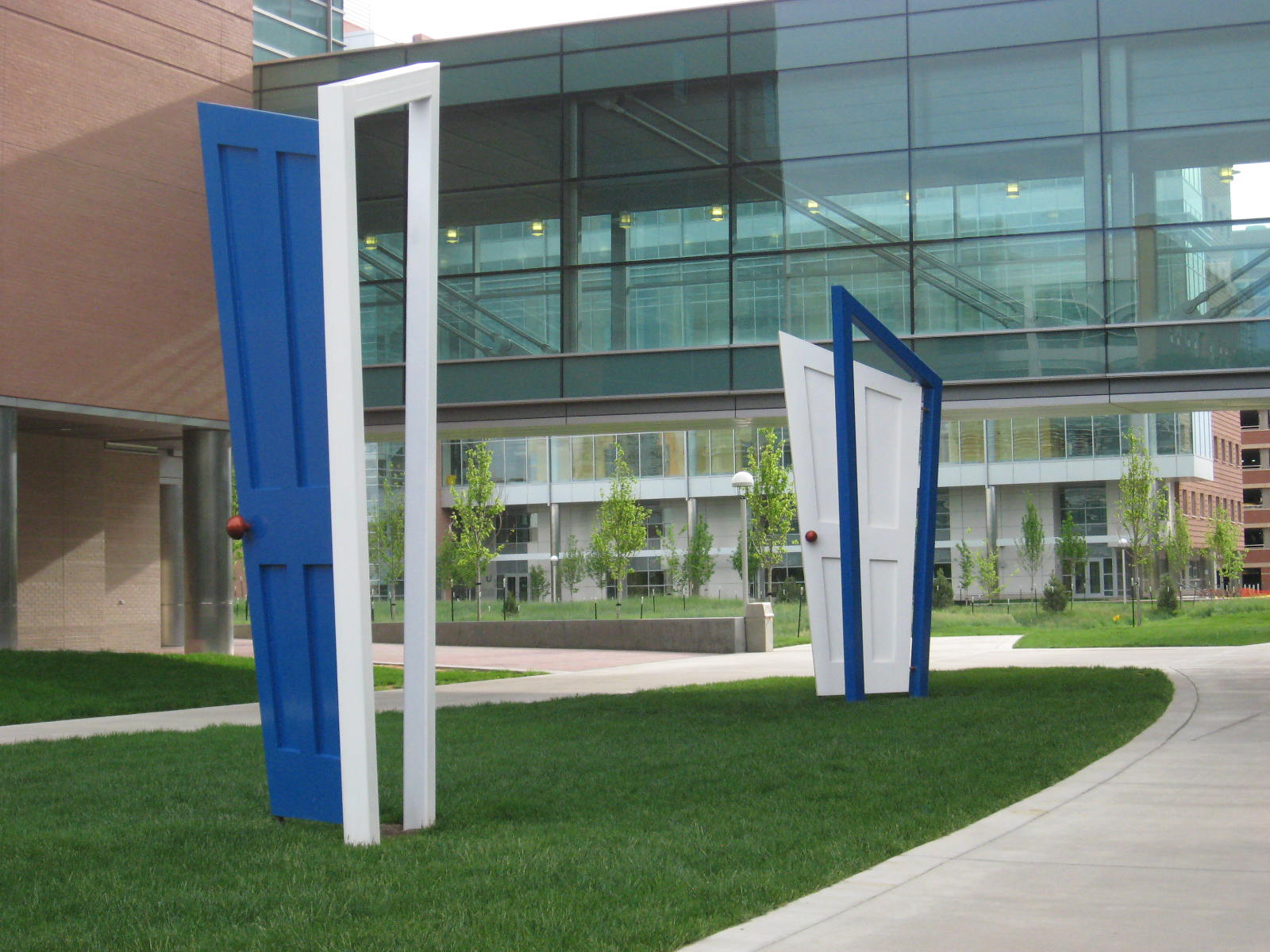
Artwork at CU Anschutz in 2008

The CU Anschutz Campus is a 256-acre (1.0 km^{2}) campus for the university, UCHealth University of Colorado Hospital, and Children's Hospital Colorado. All of the facilities on the campus, with the exception of the former Fitzsimons Hospital (referred to as 500 Main, or "Building 500" and Officially renamed Fitzsimmons building in 2018), are new construction. A series of distinct quadrangular zones on the campus governs its architectural design: the research quadrangle, consisting of the three Research Complex towers, features a contemporary glass and metal design, Research Complex I and II were designed by Fentress Architects in association with Kling Stubbins; the education quadrangle is characterized by a brick aesthetic; and the core quadrangle is located on the central axis of the campus, and anchored by Building 500. The 116,000-square-foot (10,800 m^{2}) medical library is located along the center quadrangle of the campus, and was designed as a joint venture between Davis Partnership Architects of Denver and Centerbrook Architects & Planners.

The combined 578-acre (2.3 km^{2}) of CU Anschutz and the Fitzsimons Life Science District is undergoing a $4.3 billion renovation and transformation into the largest medical-related redevelopment project in the United States. The 184-acre (0.7 km^{2}) Fitzsimons Innovation Community in Aurora is being developed north and adjacent of the health sciences areas of campus, providing opportunities to collaborate with biotechnology companies and their resources. The remaining acres of the former military facility are dedicated to commercial, hospitality, retail, and residential development.

CU Anschutz consists of three zones: an education zone with facilities for training in the medical and health-related fields, a research zone that houses the graduate programs, and a clinical care zone with the UCHealth University of Colorado Hospital and Children's Hospital Colorado, the University of Colorado School of Medicine's primary adult and pediatric hospital partners, nearby.

=== On-campus and neighboring buildings ===
UCHealth University of Colorado Hospital is an adult and pediatric partner hospital of the University of Colorado School of Medicine, and is the only academic hospital in the Rocky Mountain region. The hospital buildings on the campus include the Anschutz Inpatient Pavilion, the main 400+ bed hospital; the Anschutz Outpatient Pavilion, which houses many of the hospital's clinics; the Anschutz Cancer Pavilion, which houses the clinical services of the University of Colorado Cancer Center; the Sue Anschutz-Rodgers Eye Center; and the Center for Dependency, Addiction and Rehabilitation (CeDAR). The providers at UCHealth University of Colorado Hospital are also faculty members at the University of Colorado School of Medicine.

Children's Hospital Colorado is affiliated with the CU School of Medicine and offers pediatric medical training programs. It is the primary pediatric hospital partner of the CU School of Medicine. The hospital treats infants, children, teens, and young adults aged 0–21 throughout the region.

The Nighthorse Campbell Native Health Building houses the Centers for American Indian and Alaska Native Health. The 3-story building contains outpatient and long-distance medical consultation services, and houses the Programs for Public Psychiatry, and the TeleHealth/TeleEducation Program Office and Resource Center.

Colorado Lions Eye Institute Building. Original building from 2001 with addition in 2014.

The Anschutz Health Sciences Building began construction in January 2019 and officially opened on December 27, 2021. The building will house several programs on campus, including biostatistics and informatics, personalized and precision medicine, mental and behavioral health, health policy outcomes research, with a focus on interdisciplinary work.

== University of Colorado Cancer Center ==
The CU Anschutz Cancer Center, or CU Cancer Center, is an NCI-designated Cancer Center at the University of Colorado Anschutz's Cancer Pavilion.

=== History ===
The CU Cancer center opened in 1985 and received NCI-designation in 1988. It is the only NCI center in Colorado, and all NCI funded scientists in Colorado are members of the CU Cancer Center. In 2005, CU Cancer Center was recognized by the NCI as a consortium, comprising University of Colorado Denver, University of Colorado Boulder, Colorado State University, Children's Hospital Colorado, and the Denver Veterans Affairs Medical Center. It is also a member of the National Comprehensive Cancer Network.

The current director of the CU Cancer Center is Dr. Richard Schulick, who took over the role in June 2018.

=== Research ===
Research is organized into four (4) programs:

- Cancer Prevention and Control
- Tumor-Host Interactions
- Molecular and Cellular Oncology
- Developmental Therapeutics
