= Dove Creek (disambiguation) =

Dove Creek may refer to:

- Dove Creek, Colorado, a town
- Dove Creek (Colorado), a stream in Colorado
- Dove Creek (Missouri), a stream in Missouri
