= Rico Town Hall =

- Rico City Hall
- U.S. National Register of Historic Places
- Colorado State Register of Historic Properties
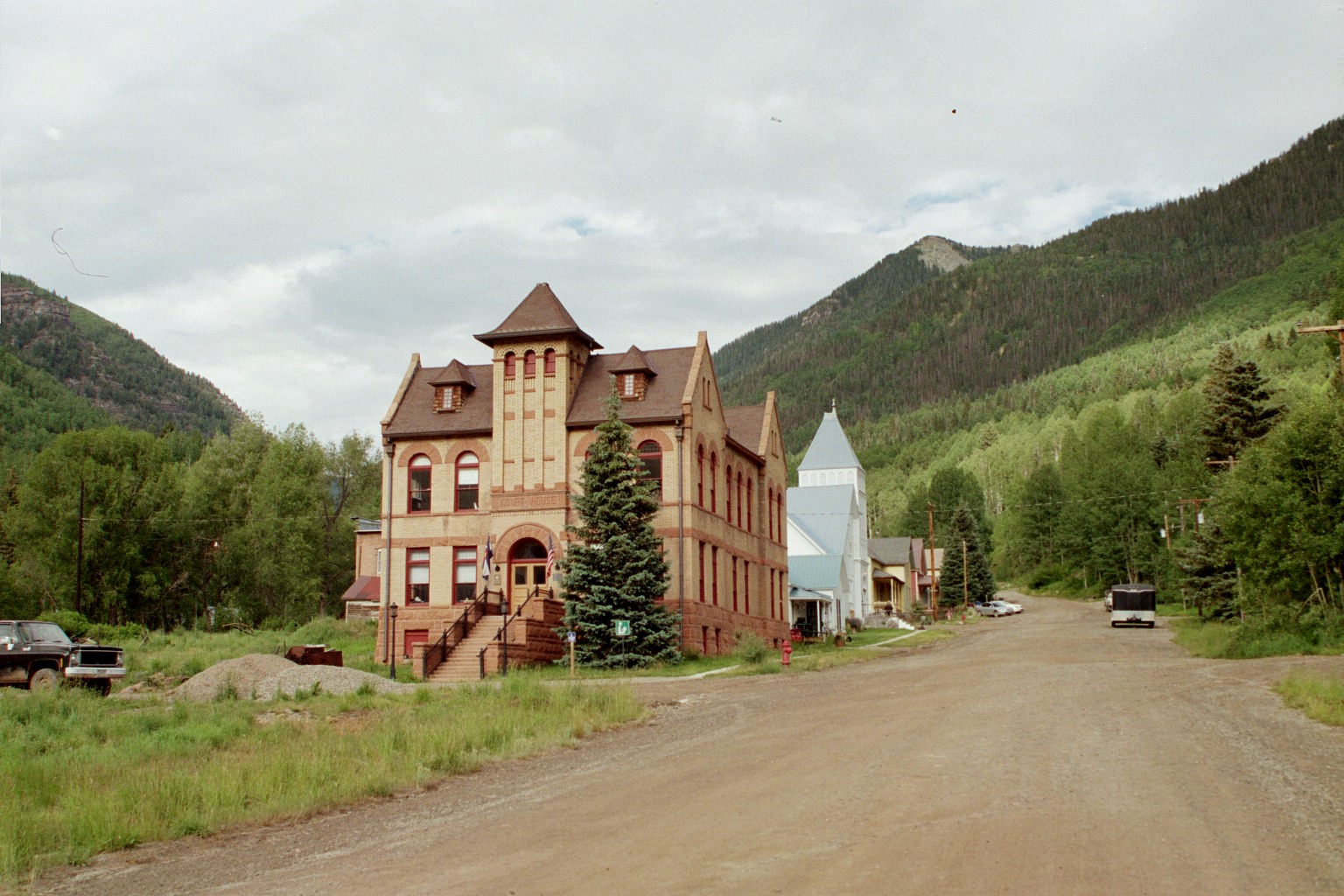

- Location within Colorado Location within the United States
- Location: NE corner of Commercial and Mantz Sts., Rico, Colorado
- Coordinates: 37°41′33″N 108°1′48″W
- Area: 0.1 acres (0.040 ha)
- Built: 1892
- Built by: Mr. Carpenter
- NRHP reference No.: 74000574
- CSRHP No.: 5DL.423
- Added to NRHP: December 31, 1974

Rico Town Hall or Rico City Hall is a multi-purpose building in the tiny mountain mining town of Rico, Colorado. Rico was formerly the county seat of Dolores County, and the city hall was built as the Dolores County Courthouse in 1892 by a "Mr. Carpenter." At the time Rico was in the middle of a gold boom and had a population of 4,000. Over time the county's population shifted to Dove Creek, and after 53 years the county seat moved in 1946. The courthouse remained vacant until 1955, when it was transferred to Rico for town offices and meeting space.

The new courthouse replaced a log courthouse. It is built of dense red sandstone from the Cutler Formation in Ouray on a local granite foundation. Brick came from the Durango Brick Yard at Lightner Creek. The 2 1/2-story structure features arched windows and parapeted end gables, with a central tower that projects slightly above the steep main roof over the entrance.

The Rico Town Hall was placed on the National Register of Historic Places on December 31, 1974.

== See also ==
- National Register of Historic Places listings in Dolores County, Colorado
