= Garrison Station =

Garrison Station may refer to:

- Garrison station (Metro-North), a train station in New York state
- Garrison station (RTD), a light rail station in Colorado
