= Remaco Spur =

External image
- railcar on spur at plant

The Remaco Spur was a 1.6 mi (2.6 km) U.S. government-owned railway line constructed from the Golden-Denver "Tramway Route 84" (Denver Tramway Corporation's 1908 electric Denver & Interurban Railroad) for transporting supplies and munitions to/from the Denver Ordnance Plant in Lakewood, Colorado. The line connected between Oak and Quail streets at the Morningside shelter and was operated by the Remington Arms Company with railyard trackage in the Denver Ordnance Zone of ~11 mi (18 km).
