= Front Range Express =

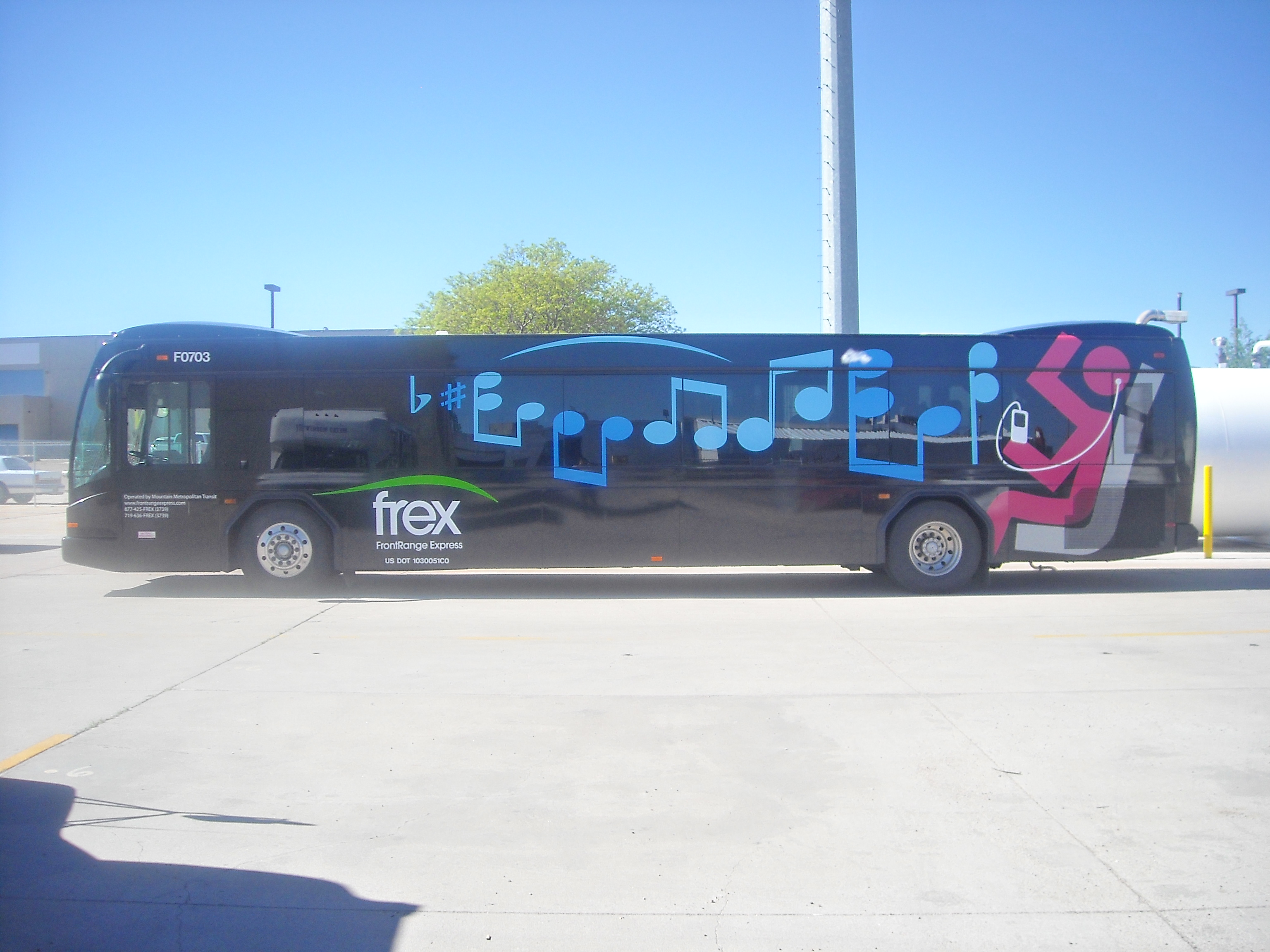
F0703, one of 19 2007 Gillig BRT's purchased in 2007.

Front Range Express (FREX – stylized frex) was a commuter bus service that began in 2004 and operated between the cities of Colorado Springs and Denver, with stops along the way in Greenwood Village, Monument and Castle Rock in Colorado, U.S. FREX operated on Interstate 25 except when exiting to make stops at each city. FREX served the southern portion of the Colorado Front Range and during its tenure was operated via different contracts by Veolia Transport & Laidlaw Transit. It was added as a part of Mountain Metropolitan Transit, which serves the Colorado Springs and El Paso County areas. In 2005, annual ridership was 118,389 and daily ridership was 464.

In 2007, nineteen Gillig BRT suburban buses were bought. Before 2007, FREX used many different models of buses including the GMC RTS, MCI 102-C3, MCI 102-D3, MCI 102-DL3 and NovaBus RTS WFD suburban. However, the older buses were prone to breaking down. To provide a more efficient service, standard Mountain Metropolitan Transit buses were used from December 2006 until the new Gillig BRT suburban buses entered service in mid-2007.

FREX buses included amenities such as free Wi-Fi available to passengers throughout the route.

Due to the lack of funding, FREX faced the likelihood of being eliminated after February 12, 2010. As a last resort, FREX put up for sale nine out of the nineteen Gillig BRT suburban buses. The first two attempts to sell the buses failed. On February 8, a successful bid of $1.44 million, an average of $160,000 per bus (a substantial loss), was made by York County Transportation Authority in Pennsylvania. These funds enabled FREX to continue for the remainder of 2010 with a reduction in service, including service times. The city of Castle Rock did not wish to help fund FREX any longer, so they lost the service at their stop.

With the budget being higher than expected for 2011, FREX service continued through 2011 and most of 2012. However, due to the Colorado Springs new mayor's wishes, the FREX service was discontinued completely on August 31, 2012.

On May 5, 2014 the Denver Post reported that the Colorado Department of Transportation (CDOT) was in the process of planning a replacement for FREX that would run along the Interstate 25 corridor and add new service into the mountains along the Interstate 70 corridor as part of their statewide transportation plan. The service is now in operation, known as Bustang South, and includes new buses with lavatories. As of 2025, the Bustang South route doesn't stop in Castle Rock, like FREX did, but a mobility hub, planned for use by Bustang, is under evaluation by CDOT.

== Service along the Front Range ==
The FREX bus service made many stops along the Front Range, including many in the Denver metropolitan area. The list below shows the stops, ordered from south to north.

- Colorado Springs
  - Fountain Park and Ride (Southern Exit) – was discontinued in 2008
  - Tejon Park and Ride
  - Woodmen Park and Ride
- Monument Park and Ride
- Castle Rock – Outlet Mall Park & Ride – was discontinued in early 2010
- Greenwood Village – Arapahoe at Village Center Park-n-Ride (Gate H)
- Denver
  - Northbound
    - Lincoln & Virginia
    - Lincoln & 7th
    - Lincoln & Colfax
    - 18th & California (Light Rail transfer)
    - 18 & Champa
    - 18th & Arapahoe
    - 18th & Larimer
    - Blake St. (Mid-block between 17th & 16th St.'s) (Market St. Station and Union Station transfer)
    - Elitch Gardens – Little Raven St. off 15th
  - Southbound
    - Elitch Gardens – Little Raven St. off 15th
    - Market & 16th (Market St. Station and Union Station transfer)
    - 19th & Market
    - 19th & Arapahoe (Greyhound bus station transfer)
    - 19th & Stout (Light Rail transfer)
    - Broadway & Court Pl.
    - Broadway & 14th Ave.
    - Broadway & Speer
    - Broadway & Alameda

== See also ==
- Bustang
- Front Range Passenger Rail
