= Garrison station (RTD) =

Light rail station in Lakewood, Colorado

Garrison
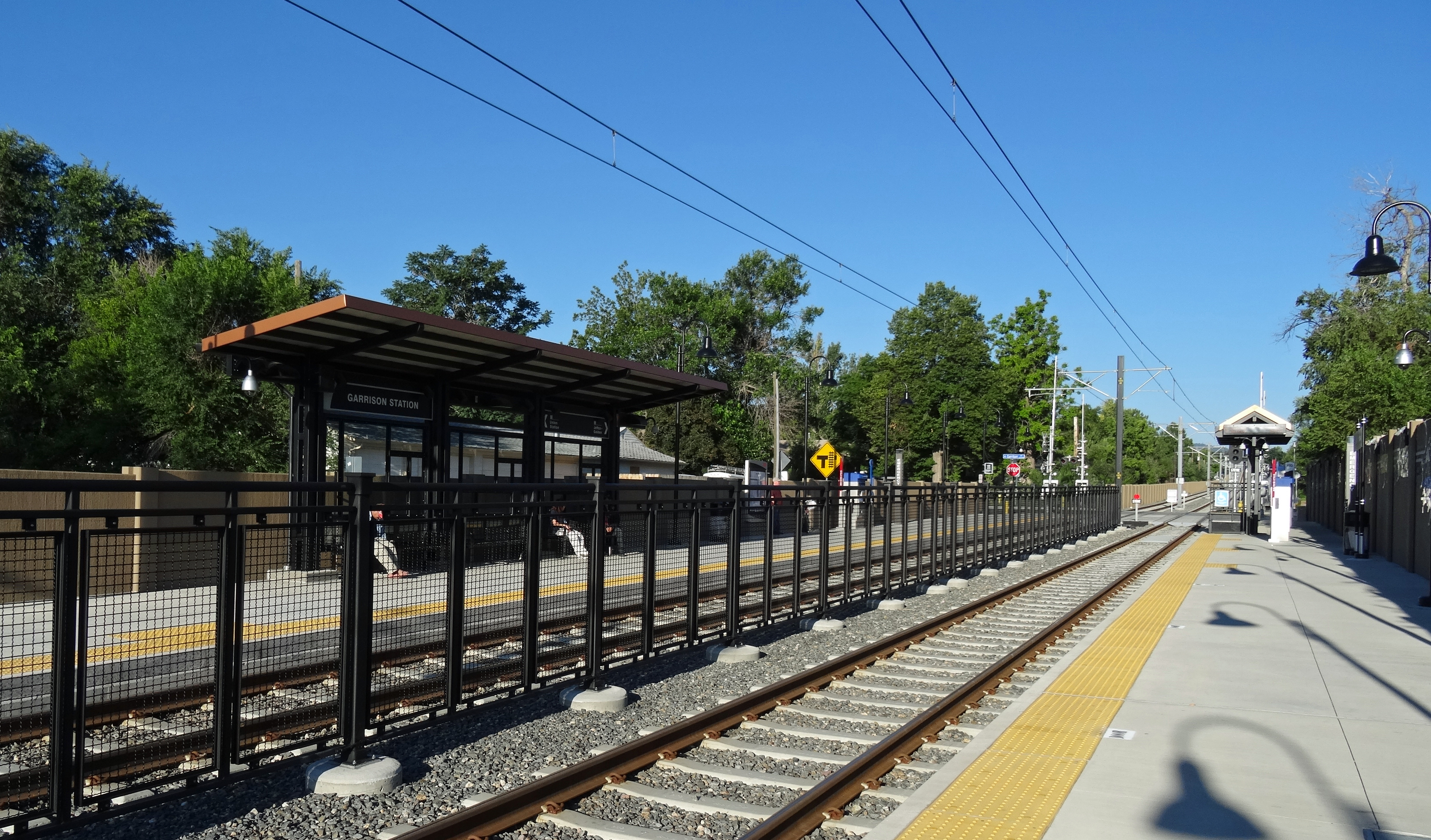
- Garrison station platform, August 2013

General information
- Location: 9091 West 13th Avenue; Lakewood, Colorado
- Coordinates: 39.7366°N 105.0995°W
- Owner: Regional Transportation District
- Line: West Corridor
- Platforms: 2 side platforms
- Tracks: 2

Construction
- Structure type: At-grade
- Cycle facilities: Racks
- Accessible: Yes

Other information
- Fare zone: Local

History
- Opened: April 26, 2013; 13 years ago

Passengers
- 2025: 676 (average daily)
- Rank: 46 out of 75

Services
| Preceding station | RTD | Following station |
|---|---|---|
| Oak toward JeffCo Gov't Cntr•Golden | W Line | Lakewood–Wadsworth toward Union Station |
Location

Garrison station is a light rail station on the W Line of the RTD rail system. It is located adjacent to Garrison Street, after which the station is named, in Lakewood, Colorado. The station opened on April 26, 2013, and was built as part of the FasTracks public transportation expansion plan.

== Station layout ==
1F

Platform Level

← Garrison Street, west end of platform
Side platform, doors will open on the right
Westbound
← toward Jeffco Government Center-Golden (Oak)
Eastbound
toward Union Station (Lakewood-Wadsworth) →
Side platform, doors will open on the right

Garrison station is located in a primarily single-family residential neighborhood. It has no bus connections or parking lot. The station has a covered bicycle parking area and the W Line bikeway connects the station to neighborhoods to its west.
