= Federal Center station (RTD) =

Light rail station in Lakewood, Colorado

Federal Center
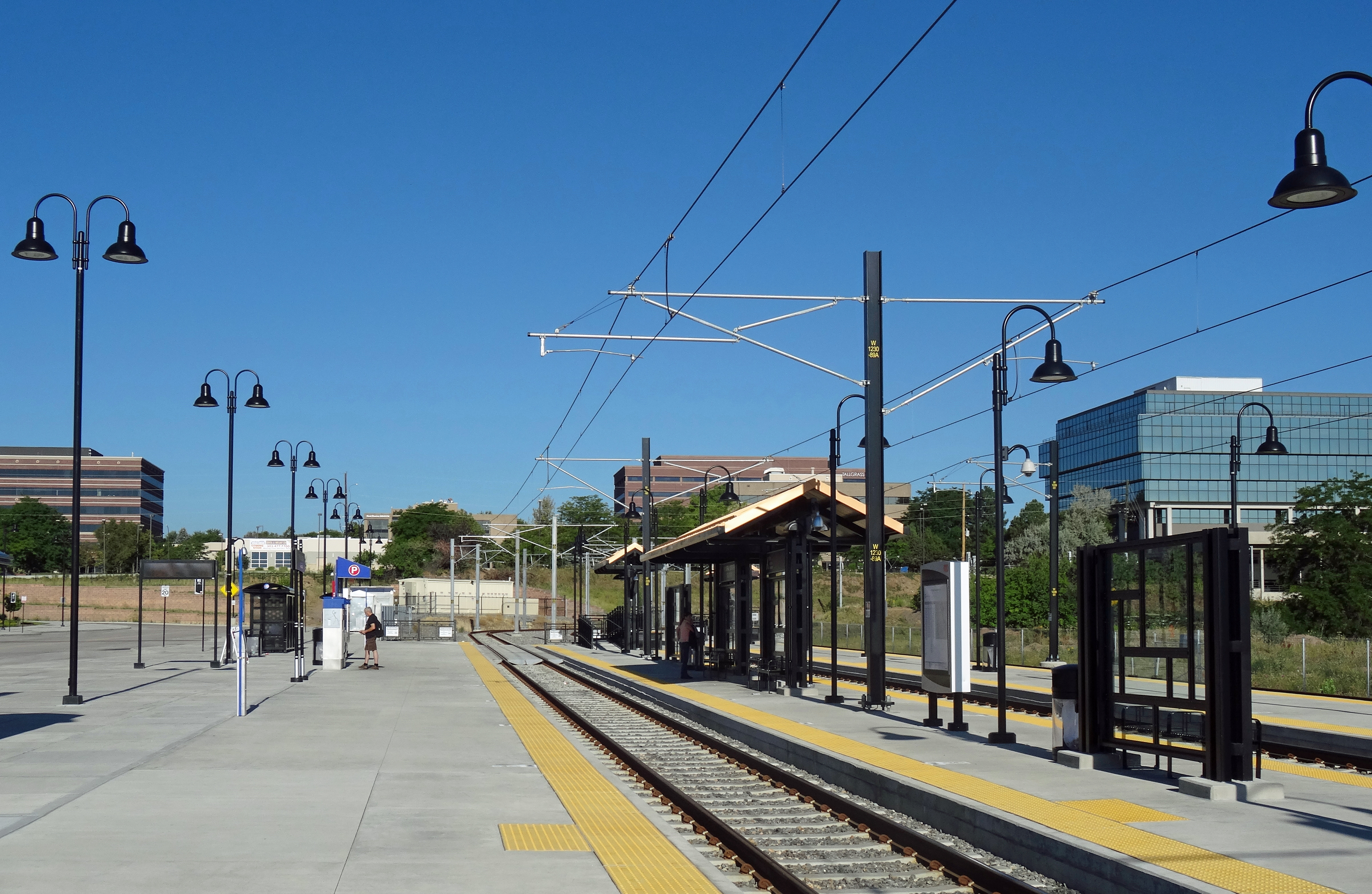
- Federal Center station platforms, 2013

General information
- Location: 11601 W 2nd Place; Lakewood, Colorado
- Coordinates: 39.720°N 105.129°W
- Owner: Regional Transportation District
- Line: West Corridor
- Platforms: 1 side platform, 2 island platforms
- Tracks: 3
- Connections: Bustang: West, Craig–Denver, Pegasus, Snowstang; Ramblin Express: Casino Shuttle; RTD Bus: 3, 99, 100, 116X, CV, EV, GS, Green Mountain FlexRide

Construction
- Structure type: At-grade
- Parking: 1,000 spaces
- Cycle facilities: 11 racks and 20 lockers
- Accessible: Yes

Other information
- Fare zone: Local

History
- Opened: April 26, 2013; 13 years ago

Passengers
- 2025: 1,333 (average daily)
- Rank: 28 out of 75

Services
Preceding station	RTD	Following station
Red Rocks College toward JeffCo Gov't Cntr•Golden	W Line	Oak toward Union Station
Location

Federal Center station is a light rail station on the W Line of the RTD rail system. It is located on the grounds of the Denver Federal Center in Lakewood, Colorado. The station opened on April 26, 2013, and was built as part of the FasTracks public transportation expansion plan.

On weekends, every other westbound W Line train terminates at Federal Center, with 30-minute frequencies west of the station to Jeffco Government Center-Golden.

== Station layout ==
1F

Platform Level

Westbound
← toward Jeffco Government Center-Golden (Red Rocks College)
Island platform, doors will open on the left or both sides
Eastbound
toward Union Station (Oak) →
Island platform, doors will open on both sides
Eastbound
toward Union Station (Oak) →
Side platform, doors will open on both sides
Denver Federal Center; 2nd Place; bus bays; parking

Weekend W Line trains terminating at Federal Center will use the center track, from which they return to Union Station. Trains continuing to or from Jeffco Government Center-Golden will use the outer tracks. The W Line narrows to a single track west of the station and remains a single track through to its terminus, limiting capacity west of Federal Center.

Federal Center is a major connecting point for RTD bus routes and for Bustang routes serving points west of Metro Denver. Long-range RTD bus connections can be made towards Boulder, Conifer, Evergreen, and Ken Caryl. Intercity buses operated by Bustang connect to mountain communities including Glenwood Springs, Grand Junction, Avon, Craig, and several ski resorts. Ramblin Express operates the Casino Shuttle to the gambling towns of Black Hawk and Central City from this station. The station also features a 1,000-space parking lot.
