= Red Rocks College station =

Light rail station in Lakewood, Colorado

Red Rocks College
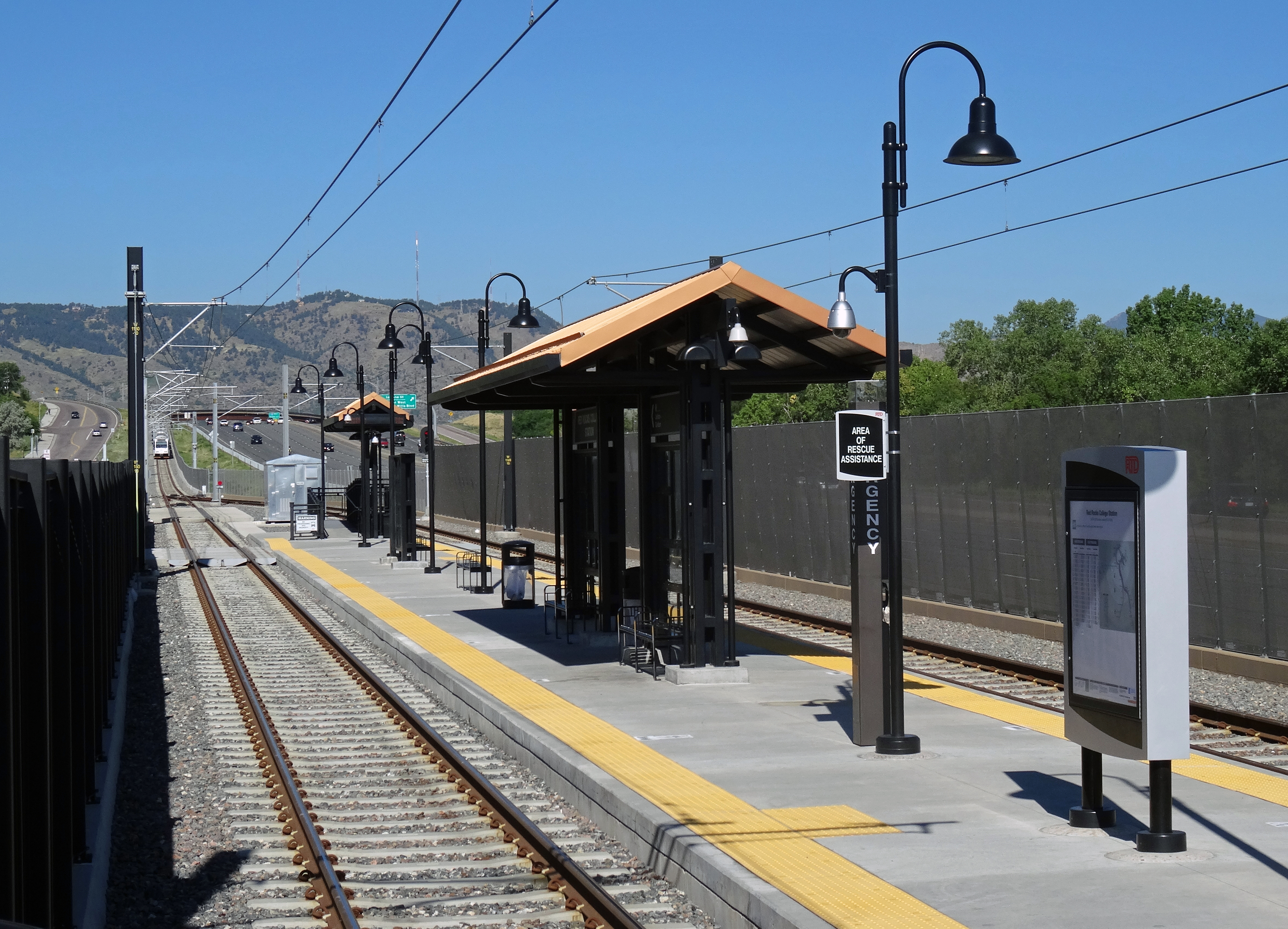
- Red Rocks College station platform, looking west towards Lookout Mountain, 2013

General information
- Location: 13400 West 6th Avenue; Lakewood, Colorado
- Coordinates: 39.7251°N 105.1524°W
- Owner: Regional Transportation District
- Line: West Corridor
- Platforms: 1 island platform
- Tracks: 2

Construction
- Structure type: At-grade
- Cycle facilities: Racks
- Accessible: Yes

Other information
- Fare zone: Local

History
- Opened: April 26, 2013; 13 years ago

Passengers
- 2025: 206 (average daily)
- Rank: 69 out of 75

Services
Preceding station	RTD	Following station
Jefferson County Government Center–Golden Terminus	W Line	Federal Center toward Union Station
Location

Red Rocks College station is a light rail station on the W Line of the RTD rail system. It is located alongside the US 6 freeway in Lakewood, Colorado. The station is located approximately a half mile to the north of Red Rocks Community College, after which the station is named. The station opened on April 26, 2013, and was built as part of the FasTracks public transportation expansion plan.

The station only sees 30-minute headways in either direction on weekends, when every other W Line train terminates at Federal Center.

== Station layout ==
1F

Platform Level

US 6
Westbound
← toward Jeffco Government Center-Golden (Terminus)
Island platform, doors will open on the left
Eastbound
toward Union Station (Federal Center) →
West 6th Avenue

Red Rocks College station has received criticism for being "convenient to nothing." The Red Rocks Community College campus is uphill from the station, and a 15 to 20 minute walk along a meandering street. Therefore, students of the station's namesake rarely use it. The station also lacks a pedestrian bridge crossing US 6, rendering it inaccessible to neighborhoods on the freeway's north side. The land surrounding the station to the south remains undeveloped as of 2026. The station does not have a parking lot or any bus connections.

Red Rocks College station ranks as the seventh-least used RTD rail station, with a daily average of 206 passengers. It is the least used station on the W Line.
