= Mountain Metropolitan Transit =

Bus company in El Paso County, Colorado, United States

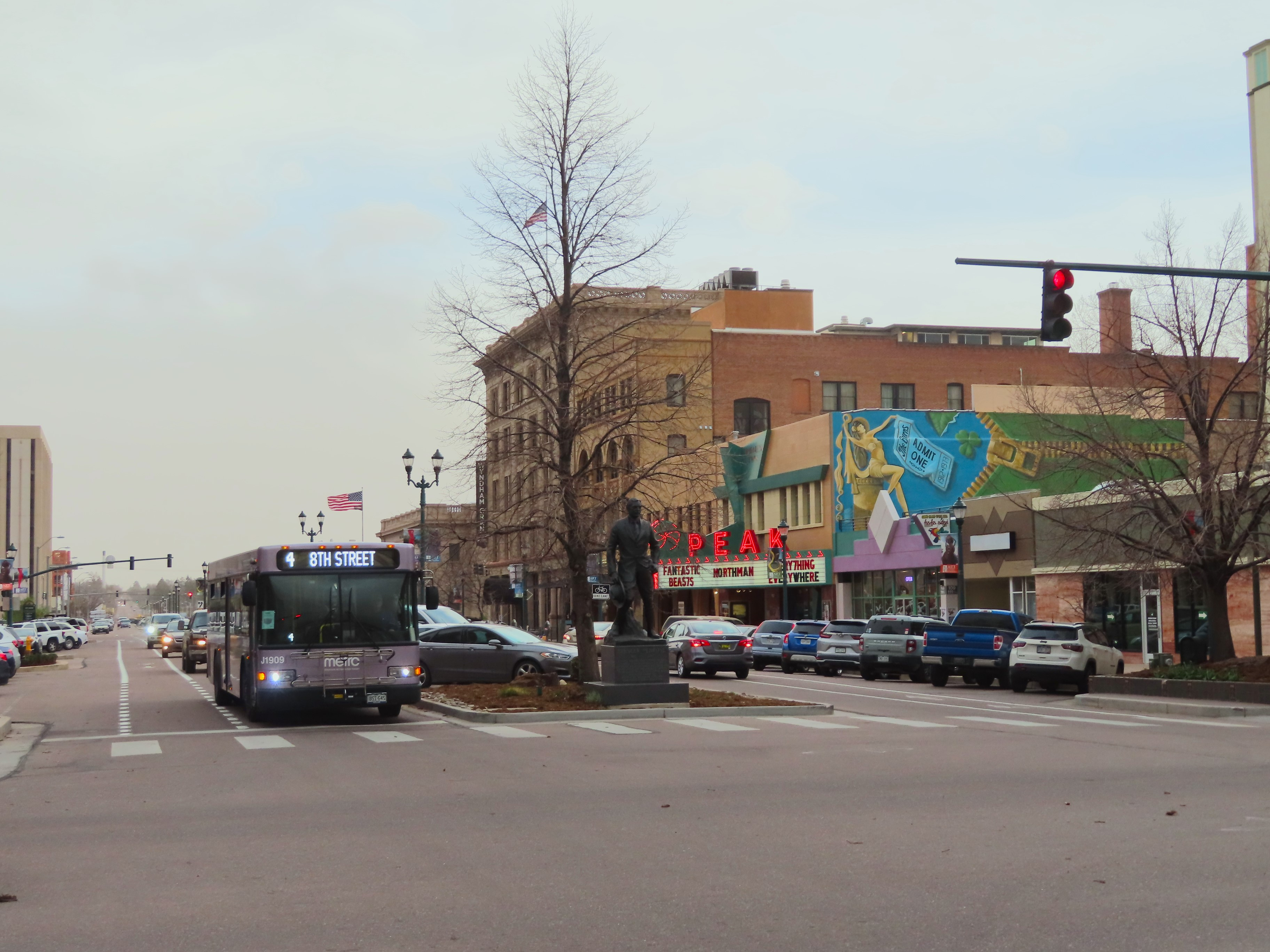
- Parent: City of Colorado Springs
- Founded: September 16, 1972
- Headquarters: 1015 Transit Drive; Colorado Springs, Colorado
- Locale: Colorado Springs; Manitou Springs; Security-Widefield
- Service type: Bus; Vanpool; Paratransit
- Routes: 34
- Stops: 979 (2024)
- Fleet: 143 (2022)
- Daily ridership: 9,200 (weekdays, Q2 2026)
- Annual ridership: 3,142,100 (2025)
- Fuel type: Diesel, Electric
- Operator: Transdev
- Website: coloradosprings.gov/mountainmetro

Mountain Metropolitan Transit (MMT) is the primary public transportation operator for the Colorado Springs metropolitan area. It provides bus service between Colorado Springs, Manitou Springs, and Security-Widefield. There are currently thirty-four local routes. In 2025, the system had a ridership of 3,142,100, or about 9,200 per weekday as of the second quarter of 2026.

== History ==
=== Springs Transit ===
For the first hundred years of the city's existence, transportation services in Colorado Springs were provided solely by private companies. On September 16, 1972, the city bought out Colorado Springs Transit and began operating a public transportation system. Rebranded as Springs Transit, it operated buses with weekday services, Saturday service (implemented in 1989), & evening service (implemented in 1992). Springs Transit spanned the city between Chapel Hills in the north to Widefield in the south, Manitou Springs in the west to Peterson AFB to the east. In 1992, there were 10 routes.

In 2004 voters approved the creation of the Pikes Peak Rural Transportation Authority (PPRTA). This intergovernmental partnership established a new sales tax across participating regions for the purpose of funding transportation projects.

=== Mountain Metropolitan Transit ===
Perhaps reflecting the new regional funding, on November 2, 2005, Springs Transit was renamed Mountain Metropolitan Transit. It also introduced bus service on Sundays for the first time in Colorado Springs history. It also added evening service for Saturdays as well. Evening service was also expanded to include more routes. Sunday service was hourly and used the same routes that ran evening service.

By early 2006, the number of transfer stations increased from two (Downtown Terminal and Citadel Mall) to eleven stations throughout the city. This allowed more direct bus service and allowed more routes to be created that didn't have to go to the Downtown Terminal to transfer.

In 2007, seasonal bus service to the Cheyenne Mountain Zoo was added. It ran from Memorial Day to Labor day, but only on weekends. Also, a couple of new express routes were added. The first one (route E-4), serviced the north section of the Powers corridor and the Northgate area. The second one (route 94), provided service to Schriever AFB from Fountain & Security/Widefield.

=== Financial decline ===
Colorado Springs was deeply affected by the budget crisis. In January 2009, the fare increased from $1.50 to $1.75. In April 2009, several routes were eliminated, including most express routes. At least six transfer stations were closed, and many routes saw cuts in service hours. The free downtown shuttle (DASH) was eliminated altogether due to lack of funding.

During this year, Mountain Metropolitan Transit received $8.8 million in ARRA funds. This money was used for many things, including allowing subcontractors to provide bus service, preventative maintenance, a new transit facility, 29 new paratransit vehicles (for Mountain Metro Mobility), three new service support vehicles, security cameras installation on the buses, and more improvements to the downtown terminal.

All evening and weekend bus services were terminated on January 1, 2010, along with the elimination of the Fort Carson and the Schriever AFB express routes due to the failure of 2C among voters. As a result, from January 1, 2010 to March 7, 2011, Colorado Springs was the largest city in the United States that had no public transit service on weekends.

=== Recovery ===
It was announced that partial weekend service would return for 2011 due to the city's budget being higher than expected. On March 12, 2011, Saturday service was added to nine routes.

On October 31, 2011, the service for Ute Pass Express, which was an express service for the city of Woodland Park, Colorado, was cut due to the federal grant expiring & low ridership.

On April 2, 2012, route 31 was eliminated due to the city of Fountain, Colorado not contracting with Mountain Metropolitan Transit any longer since the City of Fountain began their own transit service. Along with these spring changes, its ADA paratransit (Metro Mobility) increased its fare from $0.36 a mile to $0.38 a mile.

Front Range Express (FREX) had its final service to and from Denver on August 31, 2012. The popular service was decommissioned due to the city of Colorado Springs pulling its funding for the service. One of the reasons FREX was eliminated was to help restore the local bus service.

On May 19, 2013, the restored free shuttle service began in Manitou Springs. The shuttle runs along Manitou Avenue and connect the Cog Railway and Manitou Incline along Ruxton Avenue.

On March 30, 2014, some major service changes took place, including the return of Sunday service. In addition, there is Sunday-level bus services for the spring and summer holidays (Memorial Day, Independence Day, and Labor Day). However, there is no bus service for the fall and winter holidays (Thanksgiving Day, Christmas Day, and New Year's Day).

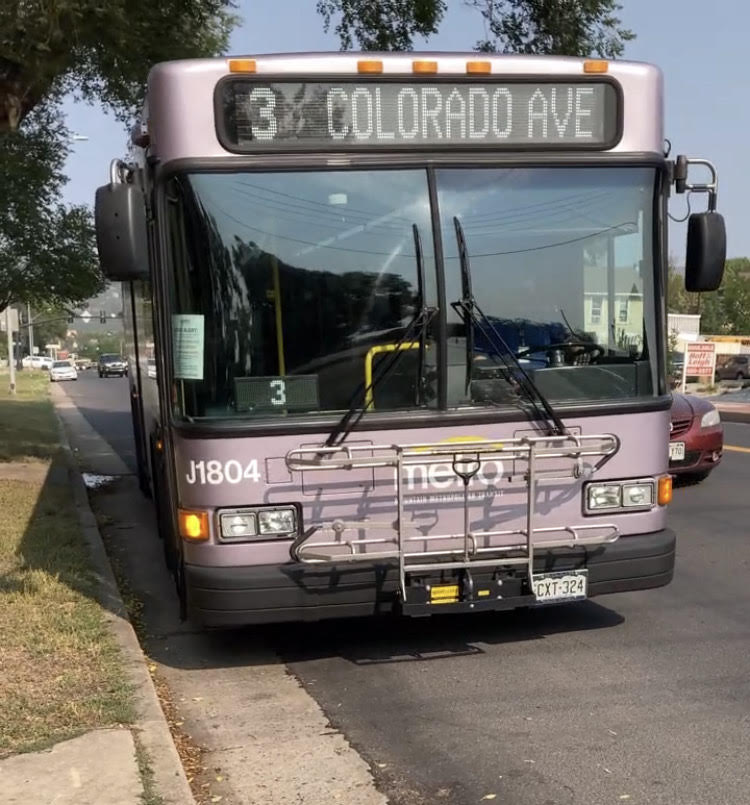
A Mountain Metropolitan Transit bus running on Route 3

Metro introduced 15-minute service on Route 5, the first time the transit agency has ever done so on a non-shuttle route.

=== Recent history ===
The COVID-19 pandemic greatly impactacted Mountain Metro's services. Ridership fell from over three million annual riders in 2019 to under two million. As of 2023, ridership had still not fully recovered to pre-pandemic levels.

Mountain Metro has recently taken measures to increase ease-of-use of their system. MMT started to provide real-time schedules on Google Maps and through their My New Bus webpage. In 2022, the mobile ticketing app RideMMT was released. Riders are now able to purchase tickets and passes from their smartphones. Additionally, riders can now purchase a Metro Card, which can be refilled at select retailers or through the RideMMT app.

As part of a push to make downtown more accessible, in 2022 Mountain Metro started running the Zeb: a free shuttle that goes between Colorado College and the south end of downtown. With headways ranging from seven to ten minutes, the Zeb is the most frequent MMT route.

In 2023, Mountain Metro participated in the statewide "Zero Fare for Better Air" initiative. This program provided grant money to public transportation systems across the state in order for them to provide free trips for the months of June, July and August. MMT saw 366,922 boardings in August: an all-time record for the agency.

== Service ==
=== Bus service ===
Mountain Metropolitan Transit provides a variety of transportation services for the Pikes Peak region. They operate twenty-nine fixed-route bus lines, three free shuttles, and two deviated fixed-route bus lines. Riders on deviated routes can request service adjustments up to three-quarters of a mile from the regular bus route. Fares can be paid by cash, tap-to-pay, Metro Card, or through the mobile RideMMT app. Buses are equipped with bike racks, and MMT has secure bike storage lockers at selection locations across the city.

=== Paratransit ===
Mountain Metro Mobility is MMT's ADA paratransit service. This service is for residents and visitors with disabilities who are unable to access the regular bus routes. Paratransit service is available within three-quarters of a mile of any existing fixed-route. Metro Mobility provided 116,858 passenger trips in 2023.

=== Metro rides ===
For areas not serviced by bus routes, Mountain Metro Rides offers three alternative transportation services. Carpool matches drivers with similar commutes for the purpose of sharing rides. Schoolpool connects parents with children attending the same school. Vanpool matches long-distance commuters and provides the group with a dedicated van.

=== List of routes ===
| Name | Terminal 1 | Terminal 2 | Ridership (2019) | Peak frequency | Notes |
|---|---|---|---|---|---|
| 1 Hillside - Hancock Plaza | Downtown; Downtown Terminal | Southeast; Hancock Plaza | 241,039 | 15 minutes | |
| 2 Centennial Blvd - Garden of the Gods Rd | Downtown; Downtown Terminal | Rockrimmon; Citizens Service Center | 46,699 | 60 minutes | |
| 3 Colorado Avenue | Downtown; Downtown Terminal | Manitou Springs; Memorial Park | 218,448 | 15 minutes | Free for all riders |
| 4 8th Street | Downtown; Downtown Terminal | The Broadmoor | 90,145 | 30 minutes | |
| 5 Boulder St - Citadel | Downtown; Downtown Terminal | Citadel; Citadel Mall Transfer Center | 384,918 | 15 minutes | |
| 6 Fillmore - Citadel | Roswell; Cascade & Taylor | Citadel; Citadel Mall Transfer Center | 50,181 | 60 minutes | |
| 7 Pikes Peak Avenue - Citadel | Downtown; Downtown Terminal | Citadel; Citadel Mall Transfer Center | 146,371 | 30 minutes | |
| 8 Cache La Poudre St | Colorado College; Cache La Poudre St & Nevada Ave | Citadel; Citadel Mall Transfer Center | 26,390 | 60 minutes | |
| 9 Nevada Ave. - UCCS | Downtown; Downtown Terminal | UCCS; Austin Bluffs & Meadow Lane | 148,595 | 30 minutes | Interlaced with route 19 to provide 15 minute frequency to UCCS |
| 10 Highway 115 - PPSC | Downtown; Downtown Terminal | PPSC; PPSC Centennial Campus | 169,885 | 30 minutes | Interlaced with route 11 to provide 15 minute frequency to PPSC |
| 11 World Arena - PPSC | Downtown; Downtown Terminal | PPSC; PPSC Centennial Campus | 262,500 | 30 minutes | Interlaced with route 10 to provide 15 minute frequency to PPSC |
| 12 Palmer Park Blvd | Colorado College; Cache La Poudre St & Nevada Ave | Cimarron Hills; Palmer Park & Space Center | 31,913 | 60 minutes | |
| 14 Chestnut - Garden of the Gods Rd | Downtown Downtown Terminal | Rockrimmon; Citizens Service Center | 75,349 | 60 minutes | Interlaced with route 2 to provide 30 minute frequency to the Citizens Service Center |
| 15 E Fountain – Cheyenne Mountain Center | Downtown; Nevada Ave & Rio Grande St | Cheyenne Mountain Center; Venetucci Blvd & Lake Ave | 26,101 | 60 minutes | |
| 16 Brookside St - Uintah Gardens | Ivywild; Nevada Ave & Navajo St | Old Colorado City; Uintah Gardens | 30,146 | 60 minutes | |
| 17 19th St - Fillmore | Colorado College; Cache La Poudre St & Nevada Ave | Roswell; Fillmore St & Cascade Ave | 26,109 | 60 minutes | |
| 18 Union Blvd – Montebello Dr | Memorial Park; 1912 Eastlake | Montebello; Montebello & Montebello Square | 10,774 | 60 minutes | |
| 19 Nevada - Eagle Rock (UCCS) | Downtown; Downtown Terminal | UCCS Nevada Ave & Eagle Rock | 110,642 | 30 minutes | Interlaced with route 9 to provide 15 minute frequency to UCCS Last stop alternates between west UCCS campus and Nevada Ave & Eagle Rock |
| 22 Southborough via Murray Blvd | Citadel; Citadel Mall Transfer Center | Hancock Plaza; Handcock & Jetwing | 88,132 | 30 minutes | |
| 23 Barnes Rd - Tutt Blvd | Springs Ranch; South Carefree & Tutt | Marketplace at Austin Bluffs; Morning Sun Ave | 99,245 | 30 minutes | |
| 24 Galley Rd - Tutt Blvd | Citadel; Citadel Mall Transfer Center | Springs Ranch; South Carefree & Tutt | New route | 60 minutes | |
| 25 N Academy Blvd - Voyager Parkway | Citadel; Citadel Mall Transfer Center | Chapel Hills Mall; Voyager Parkway | 320,617 | 15 minutes | |
| 27 S Academy Blvd - PPSC | Citadel; Citadel Mall Transfer Center | PPSC; PPSC Centennial Campus | 203,362 | 15 minutes | |
| 32 Security-Widefield | Hancock Plaza Shopping Center; Academy & Astrozon | Security-Widefield; Grand Peak & Caballero | 36,144 | 60 minutes | |
| 33 Manitou Shuttle: Incline/COG | Manitou Springs; Memorial Park | Manitou Springs; Pikes Peak Cog Railway | 240,575 | 10 minutes during peak season | Free for all riders |
| 34 Garden of the Gods Rd - Austin Bluffs Pkwy | Rockrimmon; Citizens Service Center | Marketplace at Austin Bluffs; Morning Sun Ave | 51,399 | 60 minutes | |
| 35 Las Vegas - PPSC | PPSC; PPSC Centennial Campus | Southeast Colorado Springs; 4 Seasons Drive & Janitell | 19,174 | 40 minutes | No Sunday service |
| 37 Hancock Plaza – Colorado Springs Airport | Hancock Plaza; Academy & Astrozon | Colorado Springs Airport | New route | 40 minutes | |
| 38 Montebello Dr. – Memorial North/Children’s Hospital | Montebello; Montebello & Montebello Square | Briargate; Memorial North/Children's Hospital | 2,006 | 45 minutes | Weekday service only Deviated fixed route service |
| 39 Corporate Drive - Voyager Pkwy | UCCS; Nevada & Eagle Rock | Chapel Hills Mall; Voyager Parkway | 29,001 | 60 minutes | |
| 40 PPSC Rampart to Voyager Pkwy | Chapel Hills Mall; Voyager Parkway | Northgate; PPSC CHES Campus | 8,034 | 40 minutes | Deviated fixed route service Does not run during the summer |
| The Zeb Free Downtown Shuttle | Downtown; Cascade & Rio Grand | Colorado College; Cache La Poudre St & Nevada Ave | New route | 7 minutes | Free for all riders |

== Fixed Route Ridership ==
The ridership statistics shown here are of fixed route services only and do not include demand response.

== See also ==
- List of bus transit systems in the United States
