= Pine Junction, Colorado =

- Town
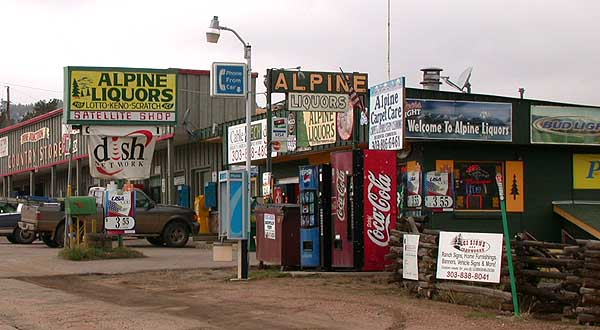
- Commercial area along US 285 in Pine Junction

- Location within Colorado Location within the United States
- Coordinates: 39°27′58″N 105°23′45″W
- Country: United States
- State: Colorado
- Counties: Park, Jefferson
- Elevation: 8,449 ft (2,575 m)
- Time zone: UTC-7 (MST)
  - Summer (DST): UTC-6 (MDT)
- GNIS city ID: 2047155
- Highways: US 285

Pine Junction is a small unincorporated community in central Colorado in the United States. Pine Junction is the first intersection with a traffic light on U.S. Highway 285 in the foothills. At this traffic light, you can turn left on Colorado Rd 126 to go to the historic Town of Pine Grove and continue to State Highway 67 to Deckers and Woodland Park.

Pine Junction is situated in the foothills of the Front Range south of Mount Blue Sky, approximately 25 miles (40 km) southwest of Denver along U.S. Highway 285. The community sits astride the Park-Jefferson county line, and is situated at the crest of a hill on the highway, east of where the highway drops from Crow Hill down into the Platte Canyon near Bailey. The community consists of a strip of retail businesses along the highway, as well as nearby houses on either side of highway. It serves partially as a bedroom community for the Denver Metropolitan Area to the northeast. It is also home to a large array of other commercial ventures such as, a hardware store, and a storage rental.

Pine Junction is part of Colorado's Bustang network. It is on the Gunnison-Denver Outrider line.
