= Dey Building =

- U.S. National Register of Historic Places
- Colorado State Register of Historic Properties
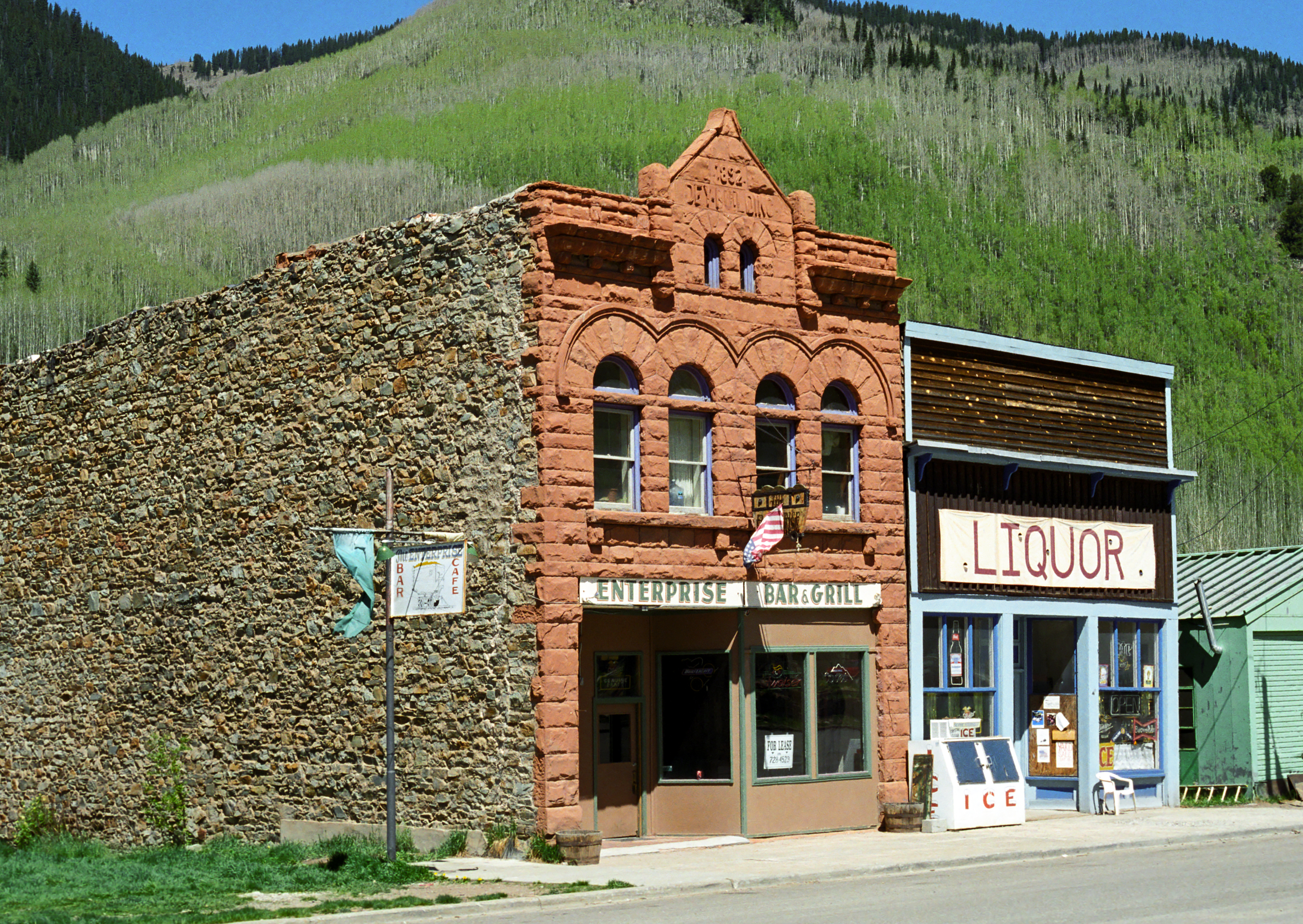

- Location within Colorado Location within the United States
- Location: 3 N. Glasgow, Rico, Colorado
- Coordinates: 37°41′33″N 108°1′53″W
- Area: less than one acre
- Built: 1892
- Architectural style: Romanesque
- NRHP reference No.: 99000448
- CSRHP No.: 5DL.479
- Added to NRHP: April 15, 1999

The Dey Building is a building in Rico, Colorado, USA, that is listed on the National Register of Historic Places for its importance as a significant local commercial building, and for its Romanesque Revival style. The Dey Building was built in 1892 with a saloon on the ground floor and offices in the upper level. The saloon has been in almost continuous operation throughout the building's history. The local newspaper refers to an H.J. Dey who operated a saloon in Rico during the 1880s, but no evidence other than the name connects Dey to the Dey Building.

== Description ==
The Dey building measures about 25 feet (7.6 m) wide by 82 feet (25 m) deep. The ground floor is a large room with a bar on the right side. Toilets, storage and clean-up areas are to the rear. Stairs to the second floor from the street are on the left side. On the second floor a hallway runs down the left side from the stairs with two rooms in the front and five more branching off the hallway. A toilet is at the rear of the second floor. A basement is entered from the rear.

The front of the building is clad in rough sandstone. A large, partly recessed storefront dominates the first floor. The second level features four heavily arched windows. A small gable with two small arched windows is centered on the cornice, lighting a low attic. "DEY BUILDING" and "1892" are carved on the gable. The roof slopes gently from front to back. Side elevations are rough local stone.

The Dey Building was listed on the National Register of Historic Places on April 15, 1999.

== See also ==
- National Register of Historic Places listings in Dolores County, Colorado
