= Dove Creek, Colorado =

Town in Colorado, US

- Statutory town
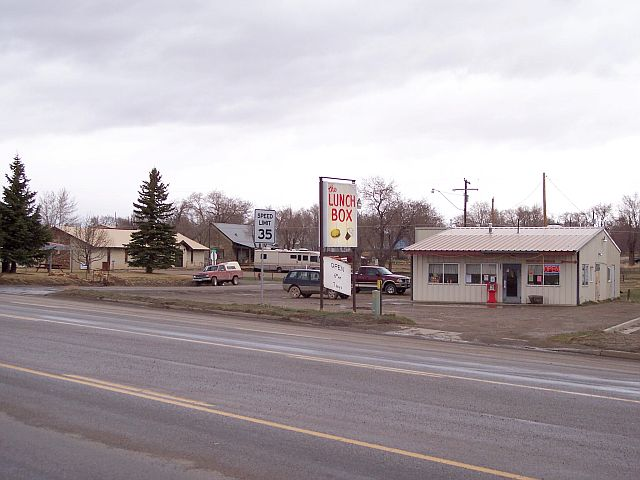
- Nickname: Pinto Bean Capital of the World
- Location of the Town of Dove Creek in Dolores County, Colorado
- Coordinates: 37°46′01″N 108°54′26″W
- Country: United States
- State: Colorado
- County: Dolores
- Incorporated: June 15, 1939

Government
  - Type: Statutory town

Area
  - Total: 0.573 sq mi (1.483 km^{2})
  - Land: 0.573 sq mi (1.483 km^{2})
  - Water: 0 sq mi (0.000 km^{2})
- Elevation: 6,844 ft (2,086 m)

Population (2020)
  - Total: 635
  - Density: 1,109/sq mi (428/km^{2})
- Time zone: UTC−07:00 (MST)
  - Summer (DST): UTC−06:00 (MDT)
- ZIP code: 81324
- Area codes: 970/748
- GNIS town ID: 2412446
- FIPS code: 08-21265
- Website: townofdovecreek.colorado.gov

Dove Creek is the statutory town that is the county seat of and the most populous municipality in Dolores County, Colorado, United States. The town population was 635 at the 2020 United States census. The community takes its name from the nearby Dove Creek. Dove Creek is the self-proclaimed pinto bean capital of the world.

== History ==
The Old Spanish Trail trade route passed through the area of Dove Creek from 1829 into the 1850s.

The Dove Creek, Colorado, post office opened on January 16, 1915.

There are several area prehistoric and historic sites listed on the Colorado State Register of Historic Properties:

- Brewer Archaeological District of two large prehistoric settlement sites: Brewer Mesa Pueblo (11th century) and Brewer Canyon Pueblo (13th century)
- Glade Ranger Station, dated before 1910
- P.R. Butt & Sons Building, built in 1914, generally considered the town's second building

== Geography ==
Dove Creek is located in western Dolores County on US 491 (formerly US 666) at the crossing of Dove Creek, the town's namesake. Dove Creek flows south to Cross Canyon, Montezuma Creek, Utah, and the San Juan River. The town is located on the northern portion of the Great Sage Plain, a large plateau covered in desert lands, bounded by the La Plata Mountains, Mesa Verde National Park, the La Sal Mountains, and the Abajo Mountains, and cut by dozens of deep canyons, which was and is a productive agricultural region. The plateau is dotted with numerous ruins of the Anasazi and other ancient people who took advantage of good soils and terrain, even with limited water resources.

The Dolores County Courthouse, built in 1957, replaces a temporary courthouse in the town used after voters of the county moved the county seat from Rico to Dove Creek in 1947, reflecting a shift in the original mining-oriented make-up of the county's population to the current situation in which farmers and a few ranchers outnumber the mountain-dwellers in the old mining districts of the eastern end of Dolores County. The courthouse is adjacent to Dolores County High School, and is part of the old business district located north of US 491; most business is now located on US 491 as it angles through the town from east-southeast to west-northwest. A regional landmark is the large concrete bean elevator located on the west edge of town, near the Dolores County Industrial Park. SH 141 intersects US 491 just west of town, and provides access to the Paradox Valley, Nucla-Naturita, and the uranium mining and industrial area of Montrose County, Colorado, and Grand County, Utah.

At the 2020 United States census, the town had a total area of 366 acres (1.483 km^{2}), all of it land.

=== Climate ===
Climate data for Dove Creek, Colorado (1991–2020)
| Month | Jan | Feb | Mar | Apr | May | Jun | Jul | Aug | Sep | Oct | Nov | Dec | Year |
|---|---|---|---|---|---|---|---|---|---|---|---|---|---|
| Mean daily maximum °F (°C) | 37.7 (3.2) | 41.8 (5.4) | 50.4 (10.2) | 58.8 (14.9) | 68.7 (20.4) | 81.2 (27.3) | 86.6 (30.3) | 82.9 (28.3) | 75.0 (23.9) | 61.7 (16.5) | 49.3 (9.6) | 38.3 (3.5) | 61.0 (16.1) |
| Daily mean °F (°C) | 27.5 (−2.5) | 31.2 (−0.4) | 39.1 (3.9) | 45.5 (7.5) | 55.0 (12.8) | 66.3 (19.1) | 72.2 (22.3) | 69.6 (20.9) | 62.1 (16.7) | 49.6 (9.8) | 38.2 (3.4) | 28.4 (−2.0) | 48.7 (9.3) |
| Mean daily minimum °F (°C) | 17.3 (−8.2) | 20.6 (−6.3) | 27.8 (−2.3) | 32.1 (0.1) | 41.2 (5.1) | 51.5 (10.8) | 57.8 (14.3) | 56.2 (13.4) | 49.2 (9.6) | 37.5 (3.1) | 27.0 (−2.8) | 18.5 (−7.5) | 36.4 (2.4) |
Source: NOAA

== Demographics ==
Historical population
| Census | Pop. | Note | %± |
|---|---|---|---|
| 1940 | 418 | | — |
| 1950 | 702 | | 67.9% |
| 1960 | 986 | | 40.5% |
| 1970 | 619 | | −37.2% |
| 1980 | 826 | | 33.4% |
| 1990 | 643 | | −22.2% |
| 2000 | 698 | | 8.6% |
| 2010 | 735 | | 5.3% |
| 2020 | 635 | | −13.6% |
U.S. Decennial Census

As of the census of 2000, there were 698 people, 285 households, and 202 families residing in the town. The population density was 1,322.5 inhabitants per square mile (510.6/km^{2}). There were 326 housing units at an average density of 617.7 units per square mile (238.5 units/km^{2}). The racial makeup of the town was 96.28% White, 1.86% Native American, 0.29% from other races, and 1.58% from two or more races. Hispanic or Latino of any race were 3.87% of the population.

There were 285 households, out of which 31.2% had children under the age of 18 living with them, 54.4% were married couples living together, 13.0% had a female householder with no husband present, and 28.8% were non-families. 26.0% of all households were made up of individuals, and 14.4% had someone living alone who was 65 years of age or older. The average household size was 2.45 and the average family size was 2.93.

In the town, the population was spread out, with 26.6% under the age of 18, 7.9% from 18 to 24, 24.4% from 25 to 44, 22.3% from 45 to 64, and 18.8% who were 65 years of age or older. The median age was 39 years. For every 100 females, there were 97.2 males. For every 100 females age 18 and over, there were 91.0 males. The median income for a household in the town was $27,500, and the median income for a family was $32,813. Males had a median income of $28,333 versus $17,500 for females. The per capita income for the town was $13,015. About 8.9% of families and 12.3% of the population were below the poverty line, including 9.9% of those under age 18 and 16.0% of those age 65 or over.

== Economy ==
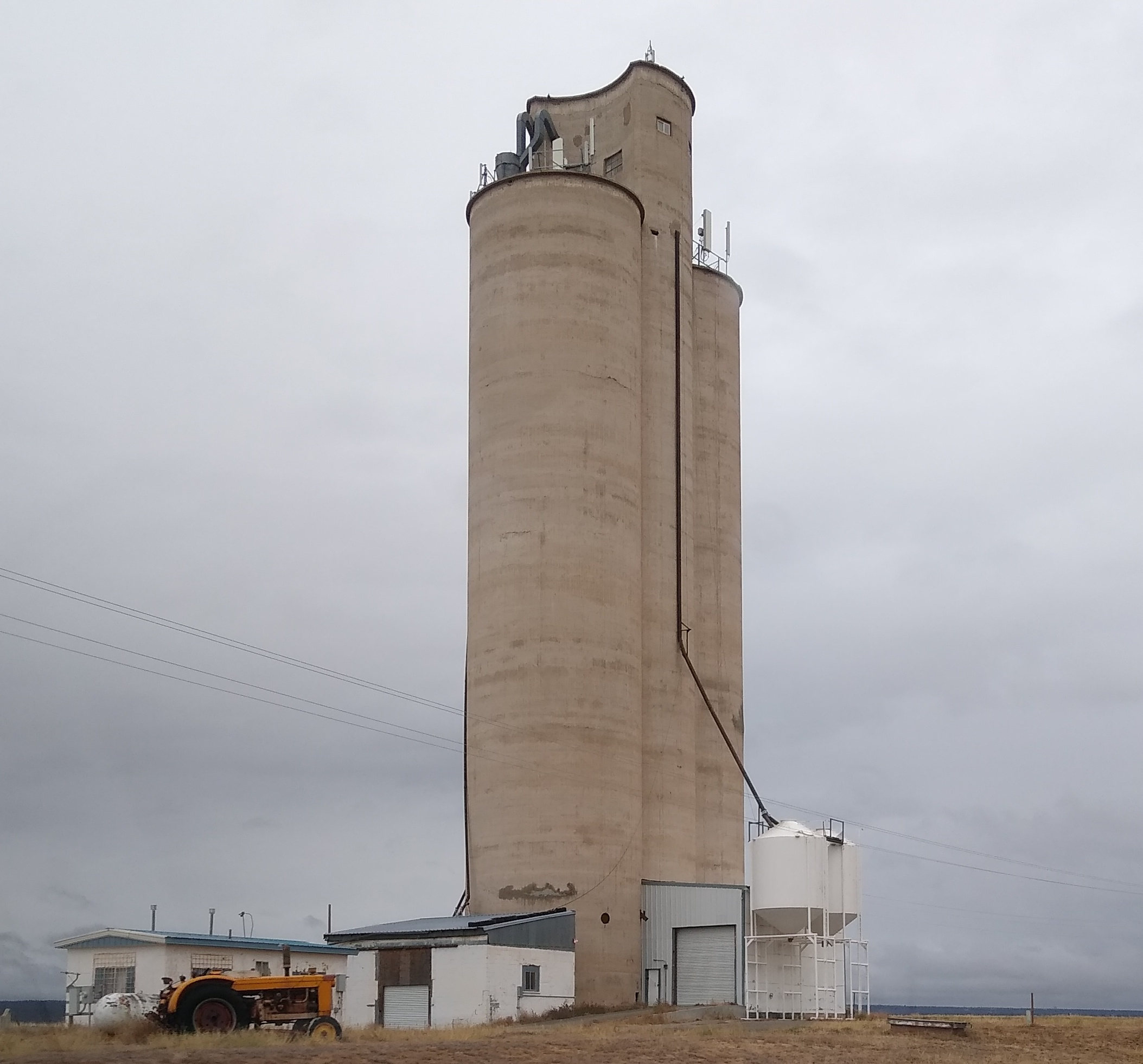
Pinto bean silo to the west of Dove Creek

The Dolores County Industrial Park is located west of Dove Creek with several tenants operated by DCDC. Midland Bean operates on the west end of the town. On the eastern edge of the town is the headquarters and facility of Adobe Milling, a company marketing various locally-grown beans and other traditional Southwestern foods. There are two fuel stations, three restaurants in town, one with a bar. The Dove Creek Inn offers accommodations and RV spaces. There are two trucking companies, a Uhaul office, two Auto Parts and outdoor goods store, a general main supply store, a feed and seed and more store, and a New Holland dealer and mechanic shop. One small box store is within town limits on the west end, another is just outside the town on the east end.

Major employers in the town include the county government and school district, and various other government agencies. Most businesses in town support agricultural operations; some provide transportation services for highway users.

== Education ==
Dove Creek is served by the Dolores County School District RE-2J, which operates two schools, an elementary school and a junior/senior high school, both in Dove Creek. As of 2024, the Dolores County School District serves around 250 students from preschool through 12th grade.

== Community news ==
The Dove Creek Press is an 824-circulation weekly newspaper, locally owned and operated. The Press office is located at 321 Main Street. Dove Creek Press ceased production in November 2021. The Pinto Bean Newspaper began a monthly print and online newspaper August 2022 based out of Dove Creek, distributed in the four corners with 4000 monthly printed copies.

== Gallery ==
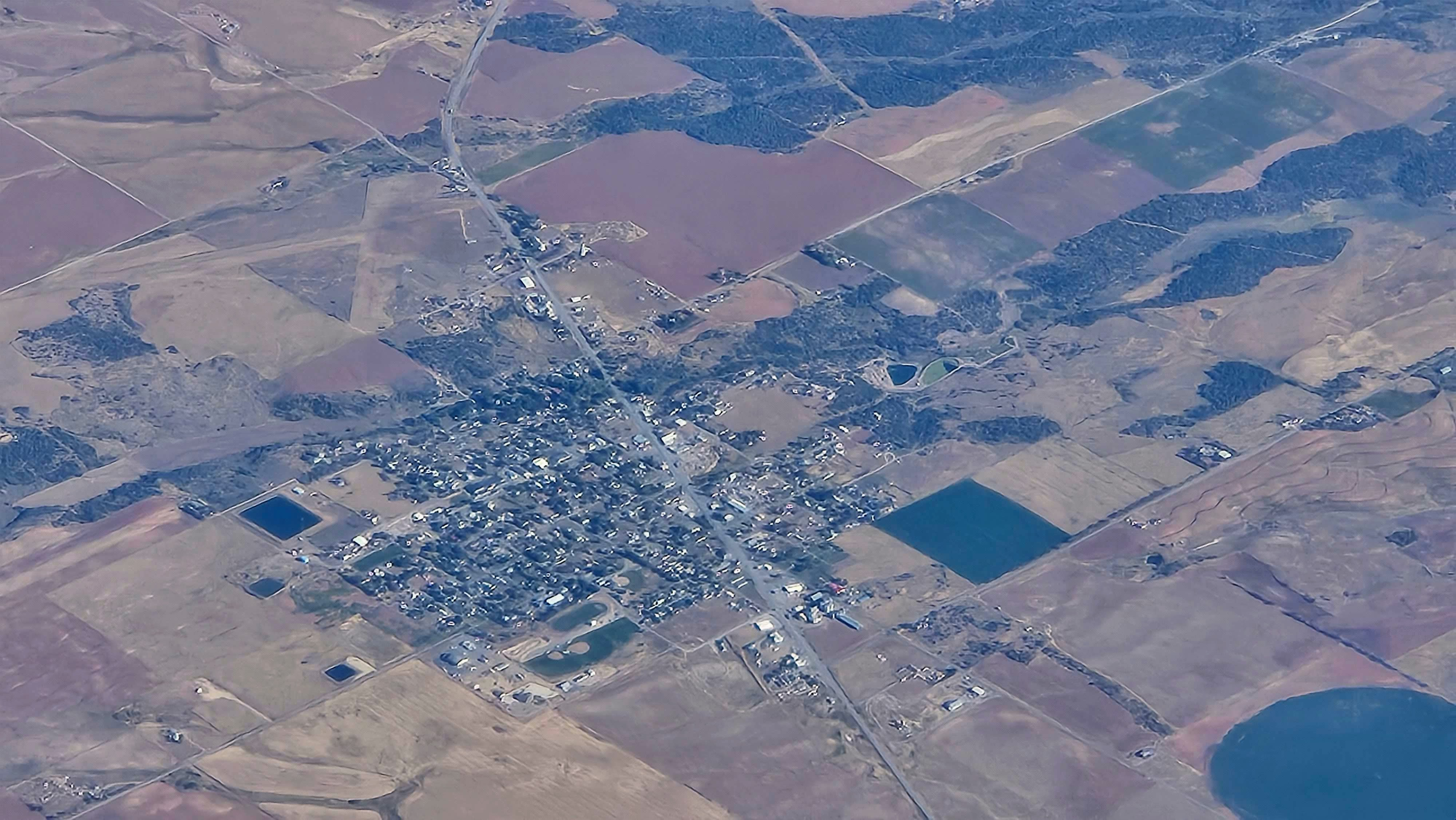
Dove Creek from above in September 2023.

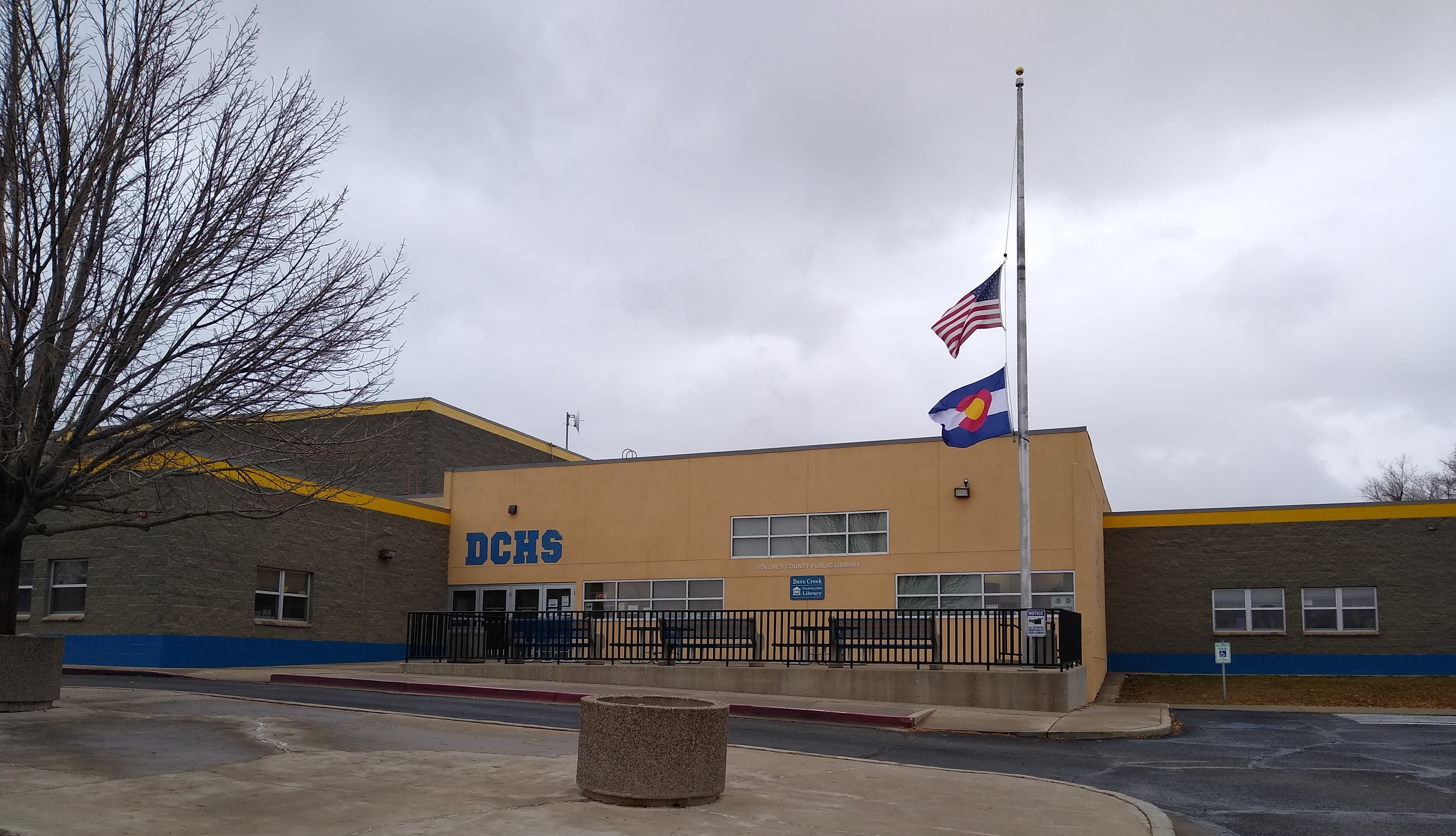
Dolores County High School.

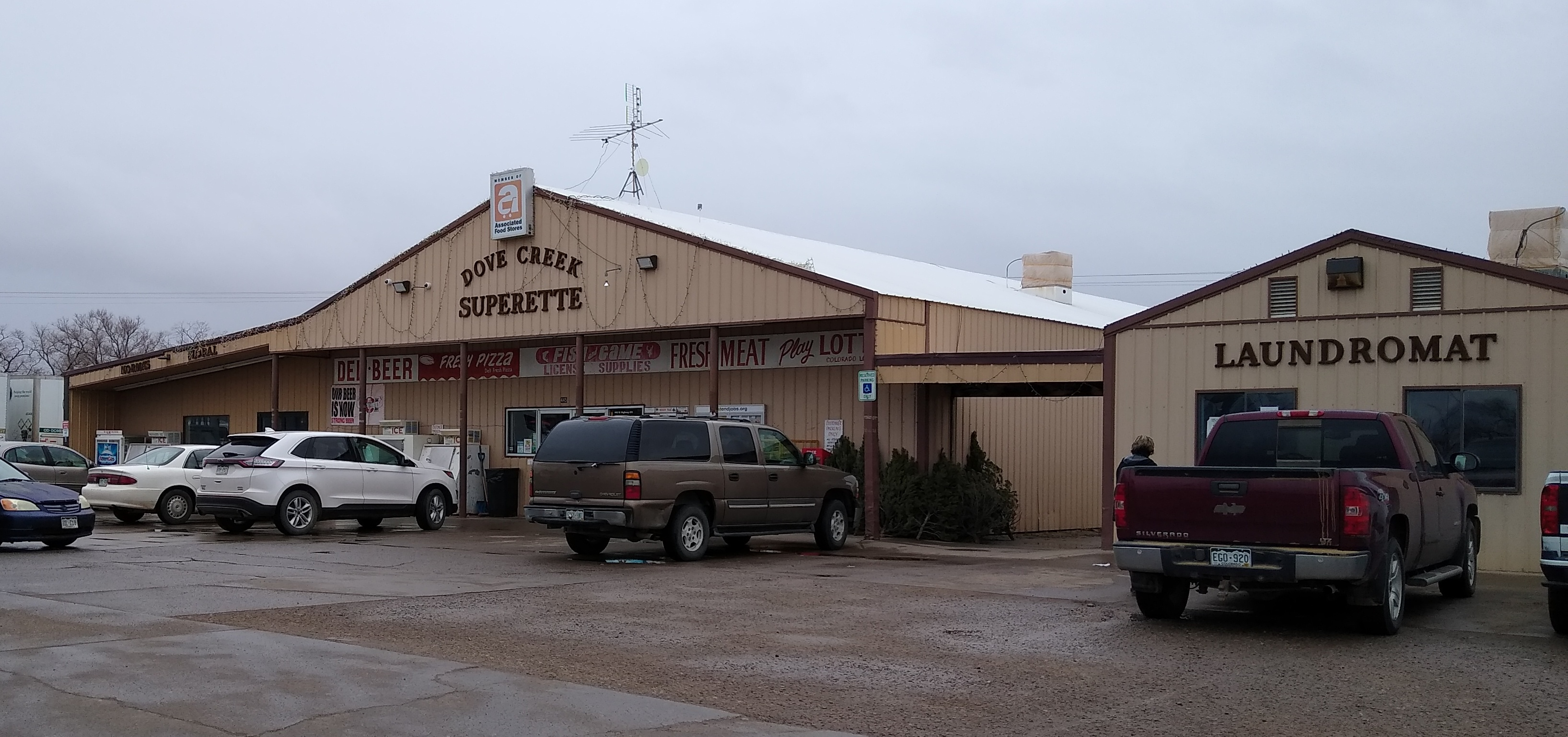
Dove Creek Superette, a gas station supermarket on U.S. Route 491.

== See also ==
- List of county seats in Colorado
