= Jefferson County Government Center–Golden station =

Light rail station in Golden, Colorado

JeffCo Gov't Ctr•Golden
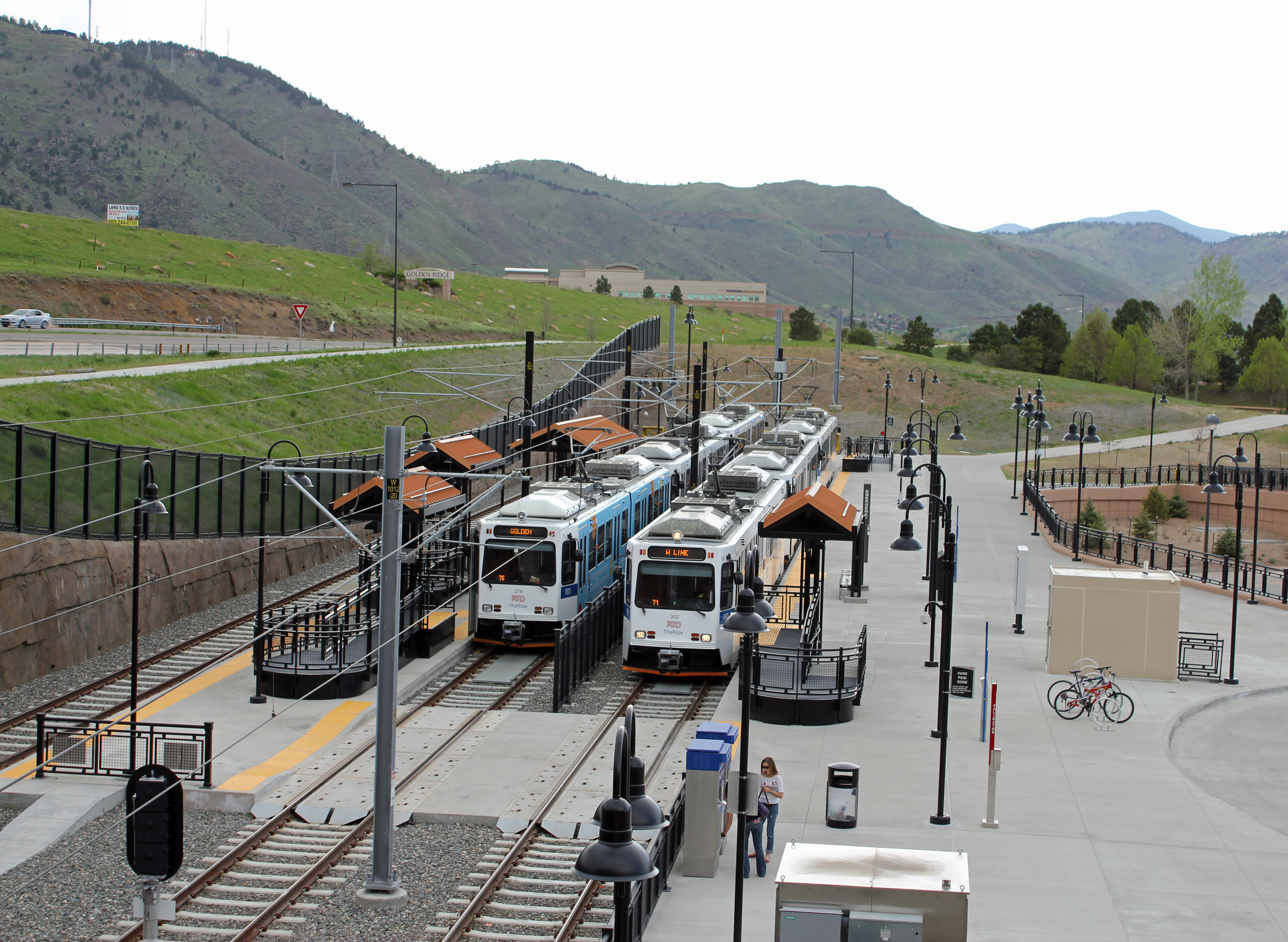
- Jefferson County Government Center–Golden station, seen from the park and ride garage

General information
- Other names: Jeffco Government Center-Golden; Jeffco Gov't Ctr-Golden; Jeffco-Golden
- Location: 605 Johnson Road; Golden, Colorado
- Coordinates: 39°43′35″N 105°12′04″W
- Owner: Regional Transportation District
- Line: West Corridor
- Platforms: 1 side platform, 1 island platform
- Tracks: 3
- Connections: RTD Bus: Golden FlexRide

Construction
- Structure type: At-grade
- Parking: 705 spaces
- Cycle facilities: 6 racks and 12 lockers, 6th Avenue Trail
- Accessible: Yes

Other information
- Fare zone: Local

History
- Opened: April 26, 2013; 13 years ago

Passengers
- 2025: 1,321 (average daily)
- Rank: 30 out of 75

Services
Preceding station	RTD	Following station
Terminus	W Line	Red Rocks College toward Union Station
Location

Jefferson County Government Center–Golden station (often abbreviated as Jeffco Government Center-Golden, Jeffco Gov't Ctr-Golden, or simply Jeffco-Golden) is a light rail station on the W line of the RTD rail system. It is located on grounds of the Jefferson County Government Center in Golden, Colorado, and is the western terminus of the W Line. The station opened on April 26, 2013, and was built as part of the FasTracks public transportation expansion plan.

The station only sees 30-minute headways towards Union Station on weekends, when every other W Line train terminates at Federal Center. Though the station is located in the city limits of Golden, it does not serve its downtown area or points of interest such as the Colorado School of Mines and there are no fixed route connections onward from the station. The connection to downtown Golden is instead made at Oak station, three stops east on the W Line in Lakewood.

== Station layout ==
1F

Platform Level

Jefferson County Government Center; parking garage
Side platform, doors will open on the right
Eastbound
toward Union Station (Red Rocks College) →
Eastbound
toward Union Station (Red Rocks College) →
Island platform, doors will open on the left or right
Eastbound
toward Union Station (Red Rocks College) →
US 6

The W Line narrows to a single track east of the station and remains a single track through to Federal Center. The single track limits capacity on this portion of the line. The station's 705-space parking garage sits above the station on its southeast side. Although there are no fixed route bus connections, there is a bus stop served by the Golden FlexRide, a demand-responsive transport service.

The Jefferson County Government Center is located directly north of the station. The station also has bicycle parking racks, lockers and a connection to the 6th Avenue Trail, a multi-use trail that runs alongside the US 6 freeway.
