= Bustang =

Public intercity bus service in Colorado

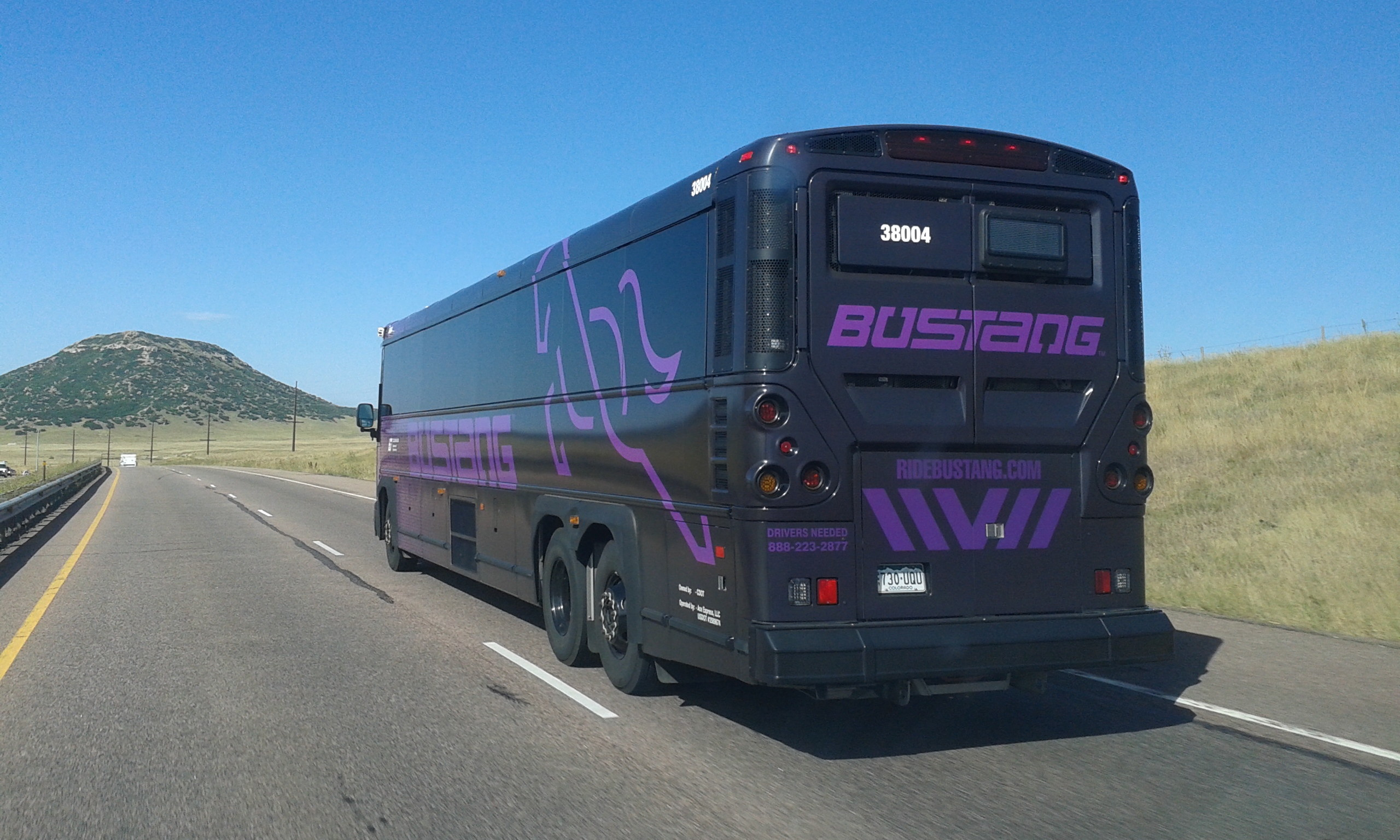
- Bustang bus headed northbound on I-25 approaching Larkspur, Colorado.
- Parent: Colorado Department of Transportation
- Commenced operation: July 13, 2015
- Locale: Colorado
- Service type: intercity transportation
- Alliance: Greyhound Lines
- Destinations: Denver, Colorado Springs, Fort Collins, Grand Junction, Durango, Gunnison, Alamosa, Pueblo, Lamar, Craig, Fairplay and others.
- Annual ridership: 351,000
- Operator: List of operators: Ace Express Coaches (North, South, West); SRDA (Outrider Lamar-Pueblo, Outrider Alamosa-Pueblo); Southern Colorado Community Action Agency (Outrider Durango-Grand Junction); Alpine Express (Outrider Gunnison-Denver); Greyhound Lines (Outrider Craig-Denver)
- Website: ridebustang.com

Bustang is an intercity bus service in the U.S. state of Colorado. Service began in 2015 and originally traveled between Denver and Colorado Springs, Fort Collins, and Glenwood Springs. Service has since been expanded to connect Grand Junction, Durango, Gunnison, Alamosa, Pueblo, Fairplay and Lamar among others. It is Colorado's first state-run bus service. Capital costs are paid for from various state and federal sources, and operating costs are covered 60% by fares. In 2025, the system had a ridership of approximately 351,000.

== History ==
Bustang service began on July 13, 2015. Service was originally provided along three lines: the West Line from Denver to Glenwood Springs along I-70, the North Line from Denver to Fort Collins along I-25, and the South Line from Denver to Colorado Springs also along I-25. The Colorado Department of Transportation estimated that there would be 87,376 passengers during the Bustang's first year of operation, however, ridership surpassed 100,000. At first the buses ran only on weekdays, but weekend service was quickly added along the West Line to accommodate skiers and along the North Line through the "RamsRoute" program. RamsRoute was intended for students and only ran one round-trip bus per weekend. Regular weekend service to both Fort Collins and Colorado Springs was added in 2017. First year revenue totaled over $1,000,000, which was enough to cover 38% of Bustang's costs.

In 2017, communities across Colorado began to lobby for expanded Bustang service. This came after the second year ridership for the Bustang reached 156,000. In early 2018, service was added between Lamar and Pueblo along US 50. The new program was dubbed "Outrider" and focuses on rural Colorado. The Outrider program was expanded in May by adding a line between Pueblo and Alamosa. Later that summer the West Line was extended to Grand Junction, with hopes that the route would hit 15,000 annual passengers. Two additional Outrider services began roughly at the same time. The first was between Durango and Grand Junction, and the second was between Denver and Gunnison. In December 2018, an additional route between Colorado Springs and the Denver Tech Center was started. Total ridership from July 2017 to June 2018 reached 194,064.

In 2019, there was pressure to further expand capacity, but a shortage of drivers needed to be addressed. The difficulty in finding new drivers has been attributed to low wages and to federally mandated drug tests. Ridership of the North, South, and West lines reached 238,252 for the 2018–2019 time period. A new bus line dubbed "Snowstang" was announced in December 2019. It is meant to ferry passengers from Denver to Arapahoe Basin, Loveland Ski Area and Steamboat Springs.

In 2021, a new route began service between Craig and Denver with stops at Steamboat Springs, Granby, Winter Park, and Idaho Springs and various locations in between.

In 2023, a new route began operating between Trinidad and Pueblo, with stops in Colorado City, Walsenburg and Aguilar.

On March 1, 2024, Bustang discontinued the Denver Tech Center route due to low ridership.

== Services ==
=== List of routes ===
The table below shows each Bustang route. Stops in italics are flag stops.

Route Name	Service	Northern/Western Terminus	Stops en route	Southern/Eastern Terminus	Frequency	Seasonality	Launch	Ridership (2022)	References
North Line	Bustang	Fort Collins	Loveland, Berthoud, Firestone/Longmont	Denver Union Station	12 times daily (weekdays); 6 times daily (weekend)	Year-round	July 13, 2015	48,652	
West Line	Bustang	Glenwood Springs or Grand Junction (Note: Fifteen trips daily run to Glenwood Springs, and six trips run to Grand Junction.)	Parachute, Rifle, Glenwood Springs, Eagle, Avon, Vail, Frisco, Idaho Springs, Federal Center station	Denver Union Station	15 times daily	Year-round	July 13, 2015	84,352	
South Line	Bustang	Denver Union Station	Colorado station, Sky Ridge station, Monument	Colorado Springs	12 times daily (weekdays); 6 times daily (weekend)	Year-round	July 13, 2015	35,068	
Denver–Avon	Pegasus	Avon	Vail, Frisco, Idaho Springs, Federal Center station	Denver Union Station	6 times daily (weekdays); 10 times daily (weekend) (Note: For the Denver–Avon route, "weekdays" refers to Monday–Thursday, and "weekends" refers to Friday–Sunday.)	Year-round	May 27, 2022	7,832	
Alamosa–Pueblo	Outrider	Alamosa	Alamosa East, Moffat, Poncha Springs, Salida, Cotopaxi, Penrose, Pueblo West	Pueblo	Daily	Year-round	May 1, 2018	3,010	
Craig–Denver	Outrider	Craig	Hayden, Milner, Steamboat Springs, Muddy Pass, Kremmling, Parshall, Hot Sulphur Springs, Granby, Tabernash, Fraser, Winter Park, Empire, Idaho Springs, Federal Center station	Denver Union Station	Daily	Year-round	January 1, 2021	8,184	
Crested Butte–Denver	Outrider	Crested Butte	Almont, Gunnison, Monarch Mountain, Salida, Buena Vista, Fairplay, Pine Junction	Denver Union Station	Daily	Monarch Mountain served December–April	June 30, 2018	14,669	
Durango–Grand Junction	Outrider	Grand Junction Regional Airport	Downtown Grand Junction, Delta, Olathe, Montrose, Ridgway, Placerville, Telluride, Rico, Dolores, Cortez, Mancos, Durango	Bayfield	Daily	Year-round	June 30, 2018	4,486	
Lamar–Colorado Springs	Outrider	Colorado Springs	Fountain, Pueblo, Fowler, Manzanola, Rocky Ford, Swink, La Junta, Las Animas, Fort Lyon	Lamar	Daily	Year-round	January 2, 2018	3,398	
Sterling–Denver	Outrider	Denver Union Station	Denver Airport station, Keenesburg, Wiggins, Fort Morgan, Brush,	Sterling	Daily	Year-round	November 1, 2022	7	
Trinidad–Pueblo	Outrider	Pueblo	Colorado City, Walsenburg, Aguilar	Trinidad	Twice daily (weekdays)	Year-round	March 23, 2023	— (Note: Ridership for the Trinidad–Pueblo route is not available because it was launched after 2022.)	
RamsRoute	Seasonal	Fort Collins	Colorado State University, Loveland, Berthoud, Firestone/Longmont, Westminster, Denver Union Station	Arapahoe at Village Center station	Weekly	CSU Fall and Spring semesters	September 11, 2015	— (Note: Ridership data for the RamsRoute is not available.)	
Bustang to Broncos	Seasonal	Fort Collins	Loveland	Empower Field at Mile High	Daily (Denver Broncos home games)	NFL season	October 9, 2016	— (Note: While ridership numbers for the individual Bustang to Broncos routes are not available, the combined ridership for both routes was 1,965 in 2022.)	
Bustang to Broncos–South	Seasonal	Empower Field at Mile High	Monument	Colorado Springs	Daily (Denver Broncos home games)	NFL season	October 9, 2016	—	
Bustang to Estes	Seasonal	Rocky Mountain National Park	Estes Park, Lyons, Boulder, Broomfield, Westminster	Denver Union Station	Twice daily (weekends)	May–October	August 24, 2019	— (Note: Ridership data for Bustang to Estes is not available.)	
Arapahoe Basin	Snowstang	Arapahoe Basin	Golden, Federal Center station	Denver Union Station	Daily (weekends)	December–May	December 14, 2019	524 (Note: Ridership numbers for Snowstang routes are for December 2022–January 2023.)	
Copper Mountain	Snowstang	Copper Mountain	Golden, Federal Center station	Denver Union Station	Daily (weekends)	December–May	December 11, 2021	883	
Loveland Ski Area	Snowstang	Loveland Ski Area	Golden, Federal Center station	Denver Union Station	Daily (weekends)	December–May	December 14, 2019	623	
Steamboat Springs	Snowstang	Steamboat Springs	Golden, Federal Center station	Denver Union Station	Daily (weekends)	December–May	December 14, 2019	170	
Breckenridge	Snowstang	Breckenridge	Golden, Federal Center station	Denver Union Station	Daily (weekends)	December–May	December 17, 2022	818	

==== Discontinued routes ====
Route Name	Service	Northern/Western Terminus	Stops en route	Southern/Eastern Terminus	Frequency	Seasonality	Launch	Discontinued	References
Denver Tech Center	Bustang	Belleview station	Various stops in the Denver Tech Center, Arapahoe at Village Center station, Monument	Colorado Springs	Daily (weekdays)	Year-round	December 17, 2018	March 1, 2024	
Telluride–Grand Junction	Outrider	Grand Junction Regional Airport	Downtown Grand Junction, Delta, Olathe, Montrose, Ridgway, Placerville	Montrose or Telluride (Note: One trip each day runs between the garage at Montrose and Telluride.)	Twice daily (weekdays)	Year-round	June 30, 2018	February 1, 2025	
Sterling–Greeley	Outrider	Greeley	Kersey, Wiggins, Fort Morgan, Brush	Sterling	Three times weekly	Year-round	November 2, 2022	January 31, 2026	

== Accidents and incidents ==
On July 17, 2023, the driver of a Bustang coach operating on the South Line ran a red light in downtown Colorado Springs and struck an SUV, causing it to roll over. The driver of the SUV escaped with only minor injuries, and everyone aboard the bus was uninjured. The coach sustained minor damage.

== See also ==
- Intercity buses in the United States
- Front Range Express (FREX)
