= Denver Federal Center =

Complex of United States federal agencies in Colorado, USA

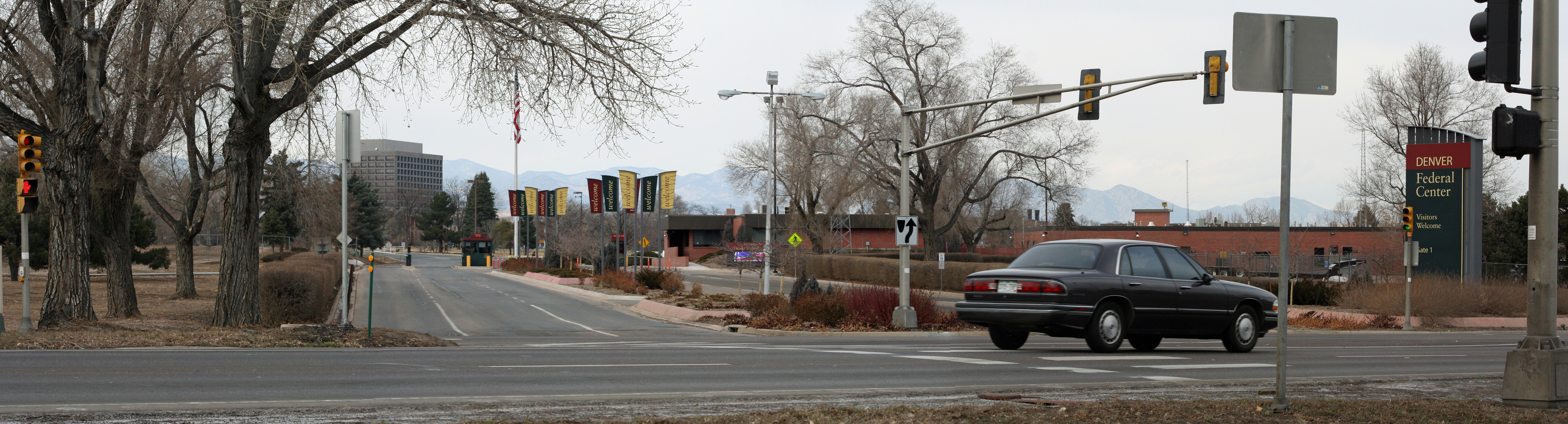
- A visitors' entrance to the Denver Federal Center
- Former names: Denver Ordnance Plant

General information
- Classification: Government office campus
- Location: West 6th Avenue & Kipling Street, Lakewood, Colorado, United States
- Coordinates: 39.719632°N 105.12105°W
- Current tenants: Department of the Interior; Bureau of Land Management; Bureau of Reclamation; United States Geological Survey; Federal Emergency Management Agency; Department of Agriculture; Environmental Protection Agency; Federal Bureau of Investigation; Federal Housing Administration; Food and Drug Administration; National Archives and Records Administration; Social Security Administration; U.S. Army Reserve
- Construction started: March 1941
- Completed: September 1941
- Owner: General Services Administration

Technical details
- Floor area: 4,000,000 square feet (400,000 m^{2})
- Grounds: 670 acres (2.7 km^{2})

Design and construction
- Known for: Largest concentration of U.S. Federal agencies outside of Washington, D.C.

Other information
- Public transit: Federal Center

Website
- gsa.gov/r8dfc

The Denver Federal Center, in Lakewood, Colorado, is part of the General Services Administration (GSA) and is home to about 6,200 employees of agencies of the federal government of the United States. The center encompasses an area of about 670 acres (2.7 km^{2}) and has 90 buildings with over 4 000 000 square feet (370 000 square meters) of office, warehouse, lab and special use space. There are 28 different federal agencies on-site, making it the largest concentration outside of Washington, D.C.

The major employers at the center include the United States Department of the Interior (and its Bureau of Land Management, Bureau of Reclamation, and United States Geological Survey) and the GSA. Special facilities at the center include the National Science Foundation Ice Core Facility.

== History ==
=== Early settlement ===
Major Jacob Downing, Colorado pioneer and judge, purchased the land in the late 1860s and developed it into a ranch, raising Arabian horses. Downing played a role in settling the Western United States. He introduced new agriculture and wildlife and helped lay the foundations for the city of Denver.

Thomas S. Hayden, a prominent Denver resident, purchased the Downing estate in 1913. He expanded it into a 20,000 acres (81 km^{2}) cattle ranch.

=== World War II ===
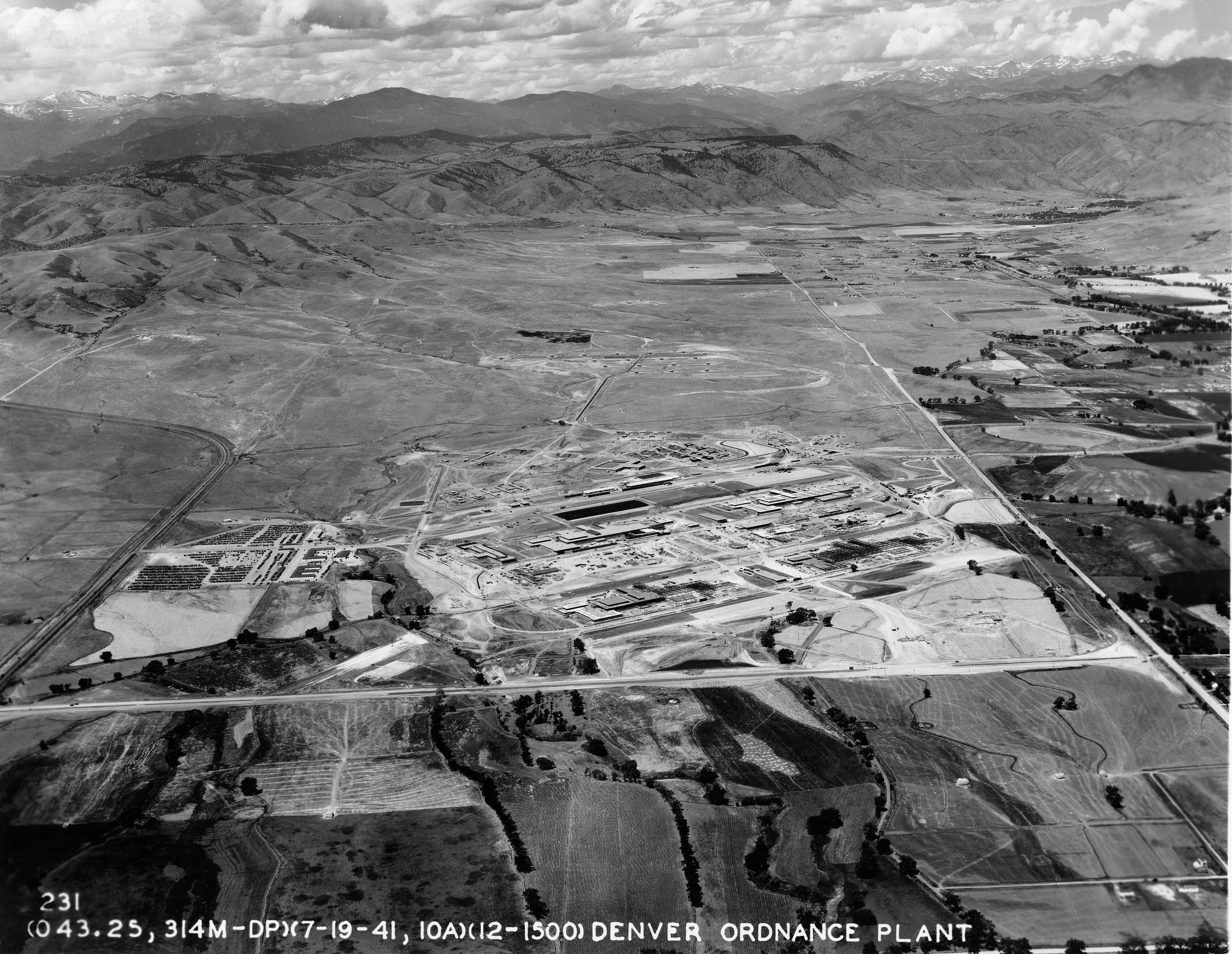
Construction of the ordnance plant, 1941

The federal government purchased 2,040.207 acres (8.25642 km^{2}) from the Hayden family in December 1940 for the purpose of building an ordnance (ammunition) plant, to be named the Denver Ordnance Plant. The site was chosen for its rural setting; because it was far from the nation's borders, it was presumed safer than coastal areas from enemy sabotage or attack. In late January 1941, the War Department signed a contract with the Remington Arms Company to produce small arms ammunition. Construction of the Plant started in early March 1941. Rapidly, the Government built over 200 buildings for the new Denver Ordnance complex, and ammunition production commenced in late September 1941. Denver Ordnance soon became known for the high quality and accuracy of its ammunition, particularly its lots of .30-06 Springfield rifle ammunition known as M2 ball, which were highly prized by snipers and other rifle marksmen in the U.S. Army. At the height of production in 1943, the Denver Ordnance Plant was the 4th largest “city” in Colorado with a workforce “population” of more than 22,000. These employees worked day and night, producing over six million cartridges a day.

=== Cold War ===
When World War II ended, ammunition production ended and the Denver Ordnance Plant became federal surplus property. A portion of the Ordnance Plant facility was converted into an office, warehouse, and laboratory space for several federal agencies. This smaller facility was given a new name: the Denver Federal Center. The Federal Center is bounded on the north by Sixth Avenue (U.S. Route 6), on the East by Kipling Street, and on the South by Alameda Avenue. The western boundary of the Federal Center is just east of Union Blvd.

Building 810, in the southwest corner of the Federal Center, was once the largest warehouse west of the Mississippi River and in 1965 was state-of-the-art and fully automated. It contained all the supplies needed to service all government facilities for the General Services Administration (GSA). Today, Building 810 is the home of several federal agencies including operations for the U.S. Geological Survey (USGS). The distribution facility for all the USGS topographic maps and publications and the storage facilities for all geologic and ice core samples drilled from around the world are located there.

Building 710 is an underground bunker complex designed to withstand a nuclear blast. The building was constructed by Army Corps of Engineers and completed in 1969 and has a total space of 36,000 square feet (3,300 m^{2}). It was intended as a base for federal operations during a nuclear attack and was designed to house 300 people for up to 30 days in the event of a nuclear war. On August 2, 2000, the structure was added to the National Register of Historic Places. It was chosen for its connection to Cold War history and its architectural significance. Today Building 710 houses the Region VIII Office of the Federal Emergency Management Agency.

=== Recent events ===
On July 9, 2007, the Lakewood City Council voted to annex, zone and vest a portion of the Denver Federal Center. Lakewood City Manager signed an offer to purchase 65 acres (26 ha) on the west side of the Denver Federal Center for $25 million. The purchase price would be reimbursed to the city through the sale of land to St. Anthony's Hospital and the Regional Transportation District (RTD). The new campus for St. Anthony Central Hospital opened in 2011, followed by the Federal Center station operated by RTD with light rail, bus service and a park and ride lot in 2013.

On August 3, 2007, The U.S. General Services Administration (GSA) Rocky Mountain Region awarded a contract worth $6.9 million to SunEdison for designing and constructing a solar park at the Denver Federal Center. The one-megawatt photovoltaic system will generate nearly 10 percent of the Denver Federal Center's peak electricity demand. The initial system was completed in January 2008. GSA expanded the solar project to include additional solar panels at an additional cost of $40 million, paid for by federal stimulus money, which government and industry experts estimate will pay for itself between 29-48 years, and expand total energy output to 15% of the Denver Federal Centers needs.

In February 2023, the Pan-African flag was flown over the Denver Federal Center to commemorate Black History Month, which was the first time that flag was flown over any federal building.

== Environmental cleanup ==
After the closure of the Denver Ordnance Plant, the GSA and other agencies disposed of miscellaneous wastes, including chemicals, contaminated material, and building and road demolition debris. The waste was disposed of in multiple sites throughout the Denver Federal Center, primarily in the Southwest and Northwest landfills, and the former United States Environmental Protection Agency Superfund Sites CO6470000039 and CO1680090031. As a consequence of the disposal of the materials, the EPA and the Colorado Department of Public Health and Environment (CDPHE) have considered these areas to be significantly contaminated by hazardous waste. Excessive levels of chemicals were found in the debris, soil, groundwater and surface water. Asbestos-containing materials were found as well.

During the 1980s, a chlorinated solvent leak emanated from an underground storage tank near Building 52. At the time, the hazardous material was managed by the United States Department of Transportation. The storage tank contained 1,1,1-trichloroethane (TCA), used to dissolve asphalt samples for testing. The leak caused a large groundwater solvent plume to spread beyond the DFC's eastern boundary and contaminate neighboring wells. To mitigate groundwater contamination by the chlorinated solvents, in 1996 the U.S. Geological Survey served as an advisor to the U.S. Army Corps of Engineers in the construction of in-ground permeable reactive barriers. The permeable reactive barriers neutralize the solvents in the groundwater. The groundwater is chemically altered as it passes through the barriers made with zero-valence iron. TCE and dichloroethene are found in concentrations of higher than 200 parts per billion as they enter the barriers and measure less than one part per billion as the groundwater exits the barriers.

In 2006 the USGS notified the Nuclear Regulatory Commission (NRC) of a leak from a water storage tank containing radioactive water and equipment. The impacted tank is used for equipment storage and not reactor operations. An estimated 575 gallons of water leaked into the ground, although USGS officials claimed there was no evidence of contamination measured at a nearby groundwater monitoring well at that time. The USGS has operated the non-power nuclear reactor since 1969.
