= Oak station (RTD) =

Light rail station in Lakewood, Colorado

Oak
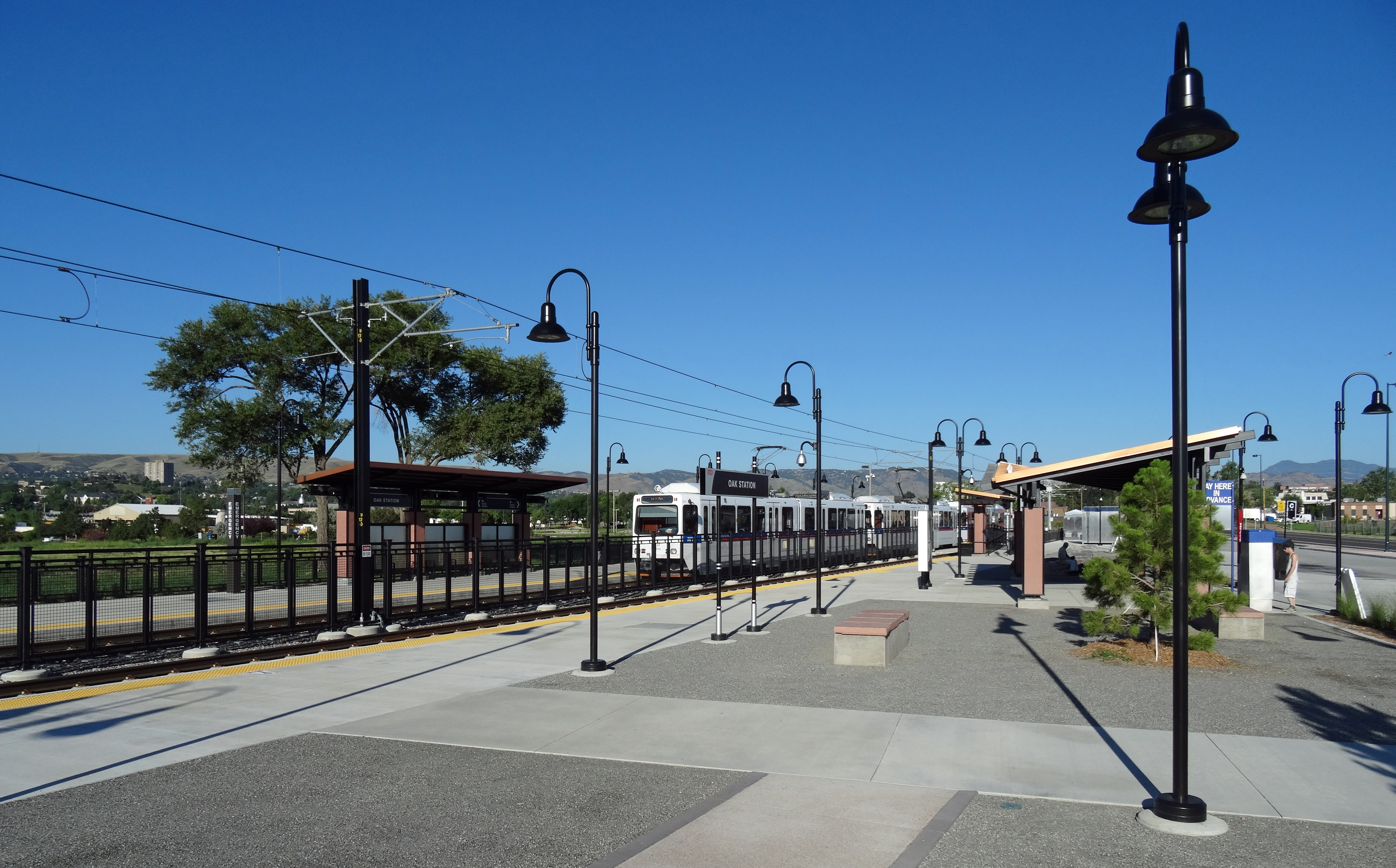
- Oak station platform, August 2013

General information
- Location: 1311 Oak Street; Lakewood, Colorado
- Coordinates: 39.7373°N 105.1199°W
- Owner: Regional Transportation District
- Line: West Corridor
- Platforms: 2 side platforms
- Tracks: 2
- Connections: RTD Bus: 16, 17

Construction
- Structure type: At-grade
- Parking: 200 spaces
- Cycle facilities: 4 racks and 8 lockers
- Accessible: Yes

Other information
- Fare zone: Local

History
- Opened: April 26, 2013; 13 years ago

Passengers
- 2025: 1,105 (average daily)
- Rank: 35 out of 75

Services
Preceding station	RTD	Following station
Federal Center toward JeffCo Gov't Cntr•Golden	W Line	Garrison toward Union Station
Location

Oak station is a light rail station on the W Line of the RTD rail system. It is located within the Lakewood Industrial Park, near the intersection of West Colfax Avenue and Oak Street, in Lakewood, Colorado. The station opened on April 26, 2013, and was built as part of the FasTracks public transportation expansion plan.

== Station layout ==
1F

Platform Level

Oak Street; Rail Road; bus bays; parking
Side platform, doors will open on the right
Westbound
← toward Jeffco Government Center-Golden (Federal Center)
Eastbound
toward Union Station (Garrison) →
Side platform, doors will open on the right

Oak station serves as the connecting point for service to downtown Golden, which the W Line does not serve despite the name of its terminal station. Connections to Golden are facilitated by a multi-gate bus transfer plaza served by RTD bus routes. The station also features a 200-space parking lot.

The area around station has seen transit-oriented development. A large complex of Terumo offices, the headquarters for the company's Blood and Cell Technologies division, opened inside the Lakewood Industrial Park in 2015. The Oak Street Station Apartments, a 392,802-square-foot (36,492.5 m^{2}) retail and housing development, opened in 2020.
