= Rico, Colorado =

Town in Colorado, United States

- Home rule town
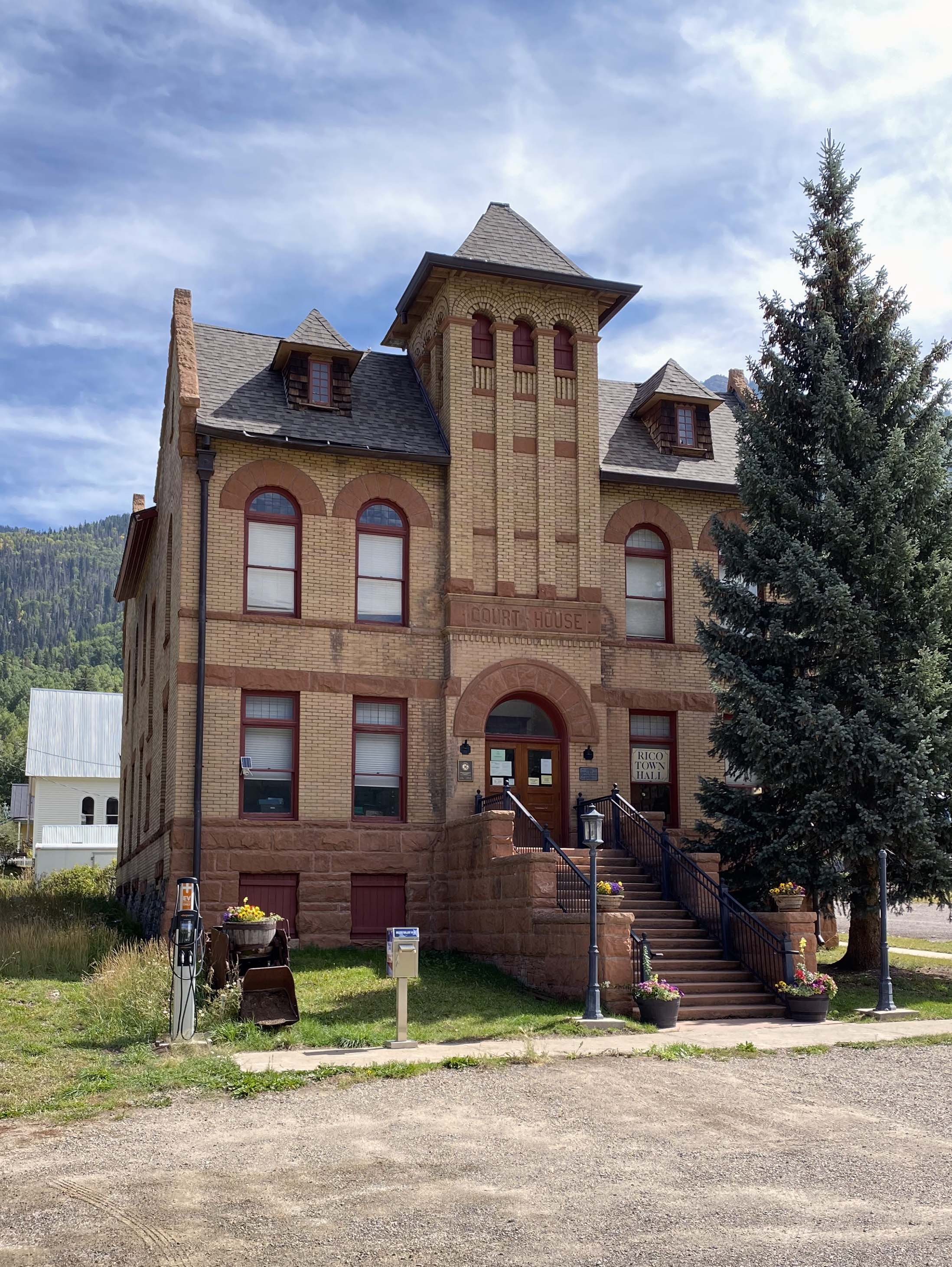
- Rico Town Hall, listed on the National Register of Historic Places
- Motto: "A Slice of Paradise"
- Location of Rico in Dolores County, Colorado.
- Coordinates: 37°41′21″N 108°01′54″W
- Country: United States
- State: Colorado
- County: Dolores
- Incorporated (town): February 25, 1880

Government
  - Type: Home rule municipality
  - Mayor: Nicole Pieterse

Area
  - Total: 0.68 sq mi (1.76 km^{2})
  - Land: 0.68 sq mi (1.76 km^{2})
  - Water: 0 sq mi (0.00 km^{2})
- Elevation: 8,773 ft (2,674 m)

Population (2024)
  - Total: 364
  - Density: 536/sq mi (207/km^{2})
- Time zone: UTC-7 (Mountain (MST))
  - Summer (DST): UTC-6 (MDT)
- ZIP code: 81332
- Area code: 970
- FIPS code: 08-64090
- GNIS feature ID: 2412550
- Website: townofrico.colorado.gov

Rico is a town in eastern Dolores County, Colorado, United States. It was settled in 1879 as a silver mining center in the Pioneer Mining District; today it functions as a historic and tourism site. The population was 288 at the 2020 census. Its current form of government is that of a home rule municipality.

Rico is a name derived from Spanish meaning "rich".

== Geography ==
Rico is located in eastern Dolores County in the valley of the Dolores River. Colorado State Highway 145 passes through the town as it follows the river, leading southwest 48 miles (77 km) to Cortez and northeast over Lizard Head Pass 27 miles (43 km) to Telluride.

According to the U.S. Census Bureau, the town of Rico has an area of 0.8 square miles (2.0 km^{2}), all of it land.

=== Climate ===
Rico experiences an alpine subarctic climate (Köppen climate classification Dfc) with long, cold, very snowy winters and short, cool summers due to the high altitude and high precipitation year-round due to orographic lift.

Climate data for Rico, Colorado
Month	Jan	Feb	Mar	Apr	May	Jun	Jul	Aug	Sep	Oct	Nov	Dec	Year
Mean daily maximum °F (°C)	38.2 (3.4)	39.9 (4.4)	43.4 (6.3)	50.5 (10.3)	60.7 (15.9)	70.6 (21.4)	75.4 (24.1)	73.2 (22.9)	66.6 (19.2)	58.2 (14.6)	45.8 (7.7)	39.5 (4.2)	55.2 (12.9)
Mean daily minimum °F (°C)	5.2 (−14.9)	7.6 (−13.6)	13.4 (−10.3)	20.9 (−6.2)	28.2 (−2.1)	33.7 (0.9)	40.3 (4.6)	39.6 (4.2)	32.7 (0.4)	24.8 (−4.0)	14.8 (−9.6)	7.2 (−13.8)	22.4 (−5.4)
Average precipitation inches (mm)	2.48 (63)	2.15 (55)	2.44 (62)	1.81 (46)	1.65 (42)	1.31 (33)	2.78 (71)	2.91 (74)	2.31 (59)	2.13 (54)	2.01 (51)	2.27 (58)	26.27 (667)
Average snowfall inches (cm)	32.1 (82)	26.5 (67)	30.8 (78)	18.5 (47)	6.0 (15)	0.1 (0.25)	0 (0)	0 (0)	0.5 (1.3)	7.6 (19)	21.5 (55)	26.2 (67)	171 (430)
Source: The Western Regional Climate Center

== Demographics ==
Historical population
Census	Pop.	Note	%±
1880	894		—
1890	1,134		26.8%
1900	811		−28.5%
1910	368		−54.6%
1920	326		−11.4%
1930	447		37.1%
1940	388		−13.2%
1950	212		−45.4%
1960	353		66.5%
1970	275		−22.1%
1980	76		−72.4%
1990	92		21.1%
2000	205		122.8%
2010	265		29.3%
2020	288		8.7%

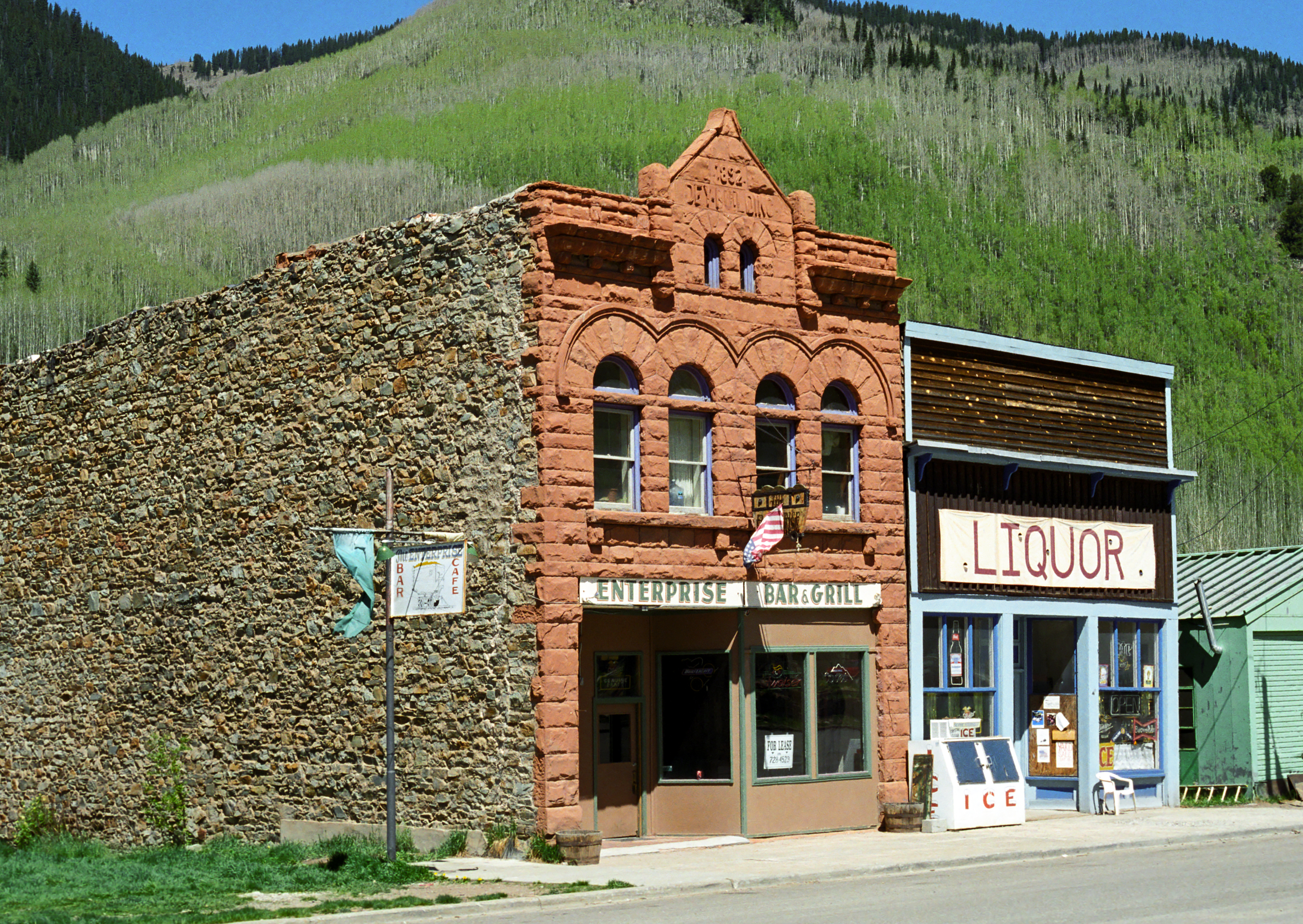
Dey Building, built in 1892 and listed on the National Register of Historic Places

== Transportation ==
Rico is part of Colorado's Bustang network. It is on the Durango-Grand Junction Outrider line. Rico was a water stop on the Rio Grande Southern Railroad, the storied narrow gauge line running from Ridgway to Durango until the railroad was abandoned in 1952. The water tank used to refill the tenders of the steam locomotives still stands on the west side of the former grade, 75 years since it was last used.

== See also ==
- San Juan Mountains
- San Juan Skyway
