= Jacob Downing =

American judge

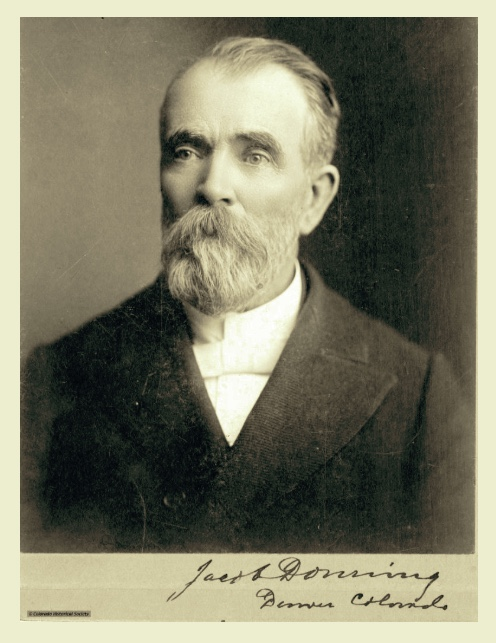
- Born: April 1830; Albany, New York, U.S.
- Died: 1907 (aged 76–77)
- Military career
- Allegiance: United States
- Branch: Union Army
- Rank: Lieutenant Colonel
- Unit: 1st Colorado Infantry Regiment
- Conflicts: American Civil War

Jacob Downing (April 1830 – 1907) was a major in the Union Army during the American Civil War. He was present at the infamous Sand Creek Massacre as a subordinate of Colonel John Chivington. After the war ended, he played a part in the development of Colorado and in particular the city of Denver.

== Early life ==
Jacob Downing was born in Albany, New York in April 1830, the youngest of 11 children of Jacob Downing Sr. (1785–1858) and Jane (née Winne) Downing. Downing Sr. was, according to one source, the owner of several farms and a successful entrepreneur. The family were Hicksite Quakers, Downing Sr. being a cousin of Elias Hicks.

The younger Downing was schooled at The Albany Academy. At 14, he went to work as a clerk at the Albany City Bank. In 1850, he was badly injured aboard the steamer Alabama when the boiler burst. He studied law in Chicago and was admitted to the Illinois bar in 1858. Downing moved to Denver, Colorado, in 1859, during the Colorado Gold Rush, or in 1860. In 1860, he was elected a judge of the municipal court.

== Military service ==
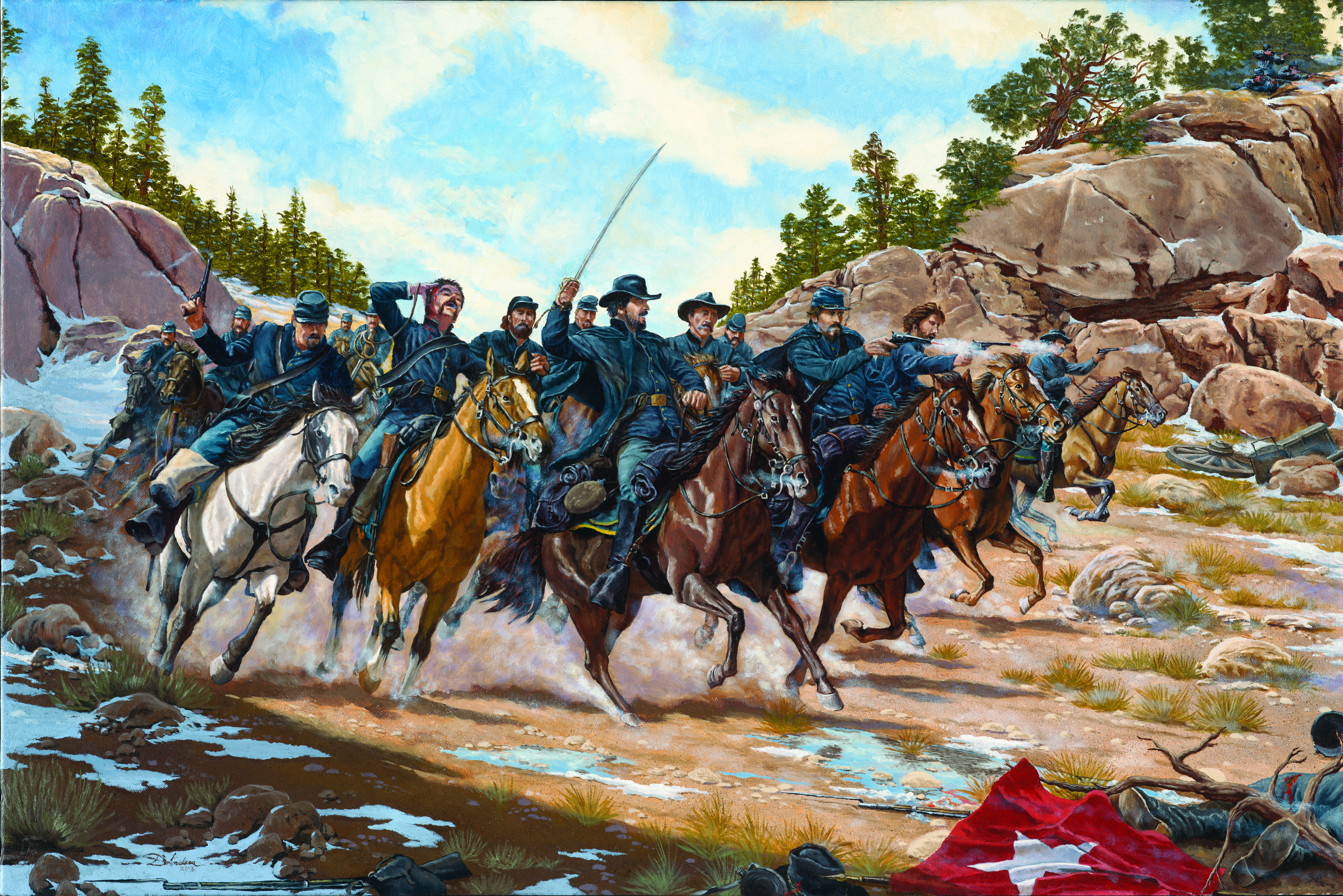
Action at Apache Canyon.

When the American Civil War broke out in 1861, he volunteered and was assigned to the 1st Colorado Infantry Regiment. He fought in the Battles of Apache Canyon and Pigeon's Ranch (March 1862), and Peralta (April 1862) in the New Mexico Campaign. Promoted to the rank of major, he was given command of Fort Larned, Kansas in 1862.

In April 1864, Downing came upon a band of Cheyenne camped near Cedar Canyon, 60 miles above the South Platte River. Although he only suspected them of stealing cattle and horses, Downing launched an attack that killed an estimated 25 Cheyennes and destroyed their lodges and belongings.

Downing was also present for and willingly participated in the Sand Creek massacre (also called the "Chivington massacre" after the officer in charge, Colonel John Chivington). In the ensuing outcry, he served as Chivington's legal counsel and subsequently lied about the atrocities that took place.

== Return to civilian life ==
He mustered out of the army in 1864 or 1865 and returned to Denver. In 1867, Downing was elected probate judge of Arapahoe County, Colorado, for a term of two years. He acquired land, and took up developing real estate, farming, and raising cattle and horses. He acquired a 2,000-acre (810 ha) ranch near Denver and made it into a showplace called "Downingdale".

A civic leader, he was one of those who pushed for parks in the community, and originated the bill that led to the establishment of City Park. He also donated land and money for the Colfax Avenue streetcar and extended and improved Mount View Boulevard. When the Gentlemen's Driving and Riding Club of Denver, established in 1882 and whose members were "men who were leaders in the Denver business community and society", moved from Arlington Park to City Park, in the mid-1880s, "Downing acquired the property and maintained it as a clubhouse." After his death in 1907, his widow converted the building into the Downing Home for Old People. South Downing Street in Denver is named after him.

== Personal life ==
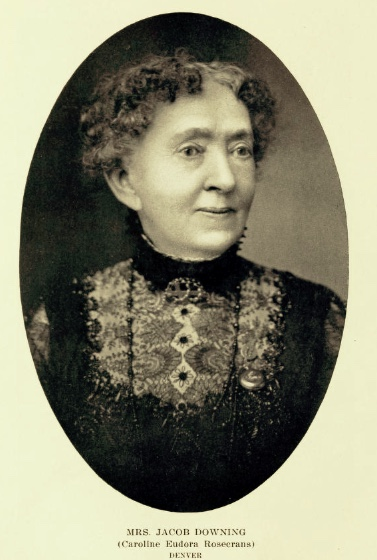
Caroline Eudora Rosecrans Downing, Representative Women of Colorado, 1914

On November 1, 1871, he married Caroline Rosecrans in Glen Falls, New York. She was an artist, musician and poet. Caroline Downing was the first member of the Ladies' Relief Society, president of the Ladies' Auxiliary to the Grand Army of the Republic and president of Pioneer Ladies' Aid Society. She gave to the Denver Orphans' Home, Colorado Women's College, Children's Hospital, Denver Public Library and Jacob Downing Home for the Aged. She was a member of the Woman's Press Club and the Woman's Club.
