= Jefferson County Government Center =

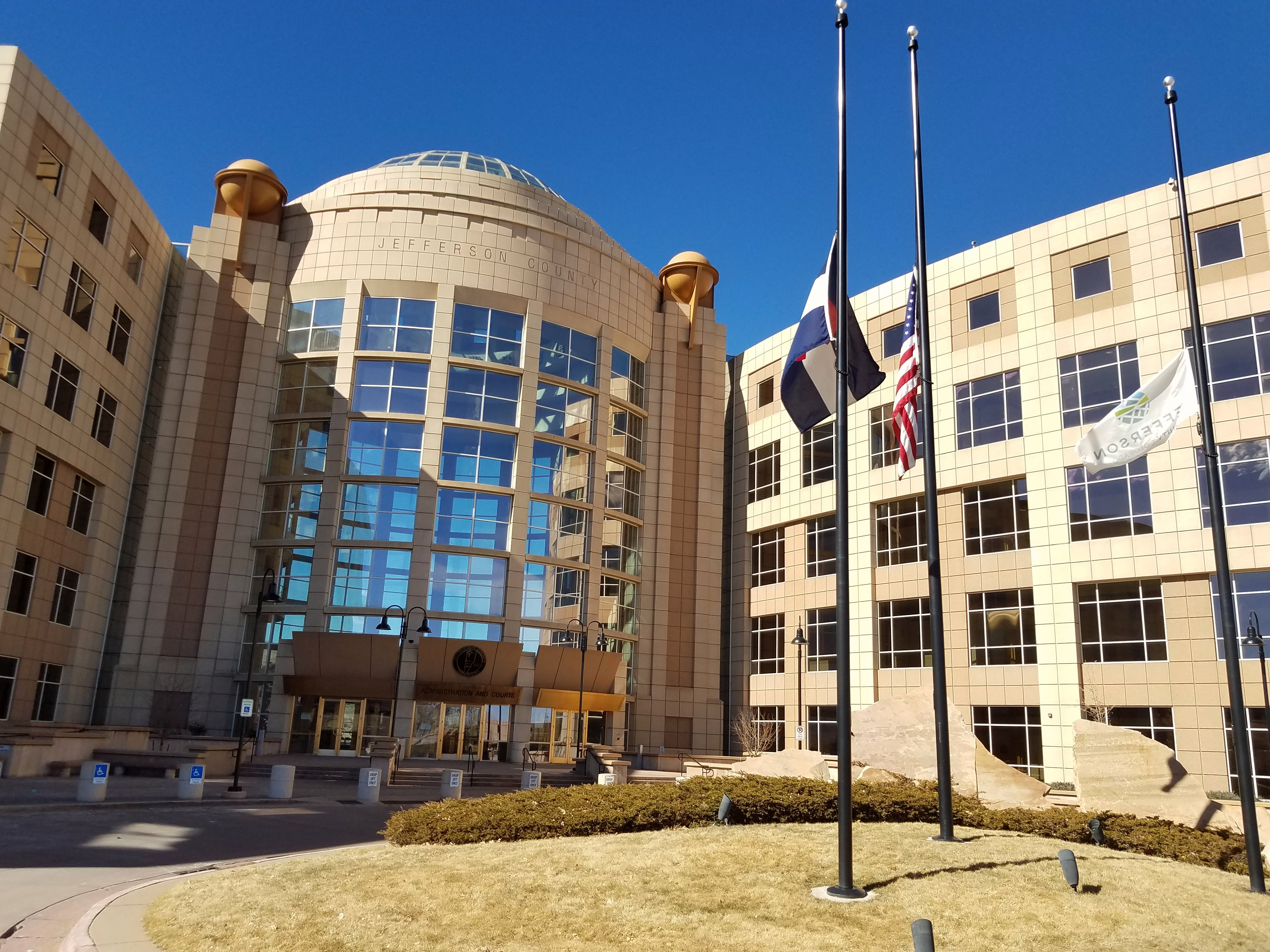
- Front entrance of the Jefferson County Courthouse at the Jefferson County Government Center
- Interactive map of the Jefferson County Government Center area

General information
- Type: Government / civic center
- Location: Golden, Colorado, U.S.
- Coordinates: 39°43′42″N 105°12′06″W
- Owner: Jefferson County, Colorado

Technical details
- Floor area: 531,000 square feet (49,300 m^{2})

Design and construction
- Architect: Fentress Architects

The Jefferson County Government Center, is a consolidation of numerous governmental departments for Jefferson County, Colorado.

Located in Golden, Colorado, the 531,000-square-foot (49,300 m^{2}) contains a judicial wing of 304,000 square feet (28,200 m^{2}) and an administrative wing, joined by the central lobby atrium, of 227,000 square feet (21,100 m^{2}). The government center opened in 1993.

Concealed either underground or by landscaping, the government center’s two-story parking structure holds 1,400 vehicles and serves both wings. In addition, a 15,000-square-foot (1,400 m^{2}) tunnel and central holding facility connects the judicial building to a pre-existing detention center.

== Design ==
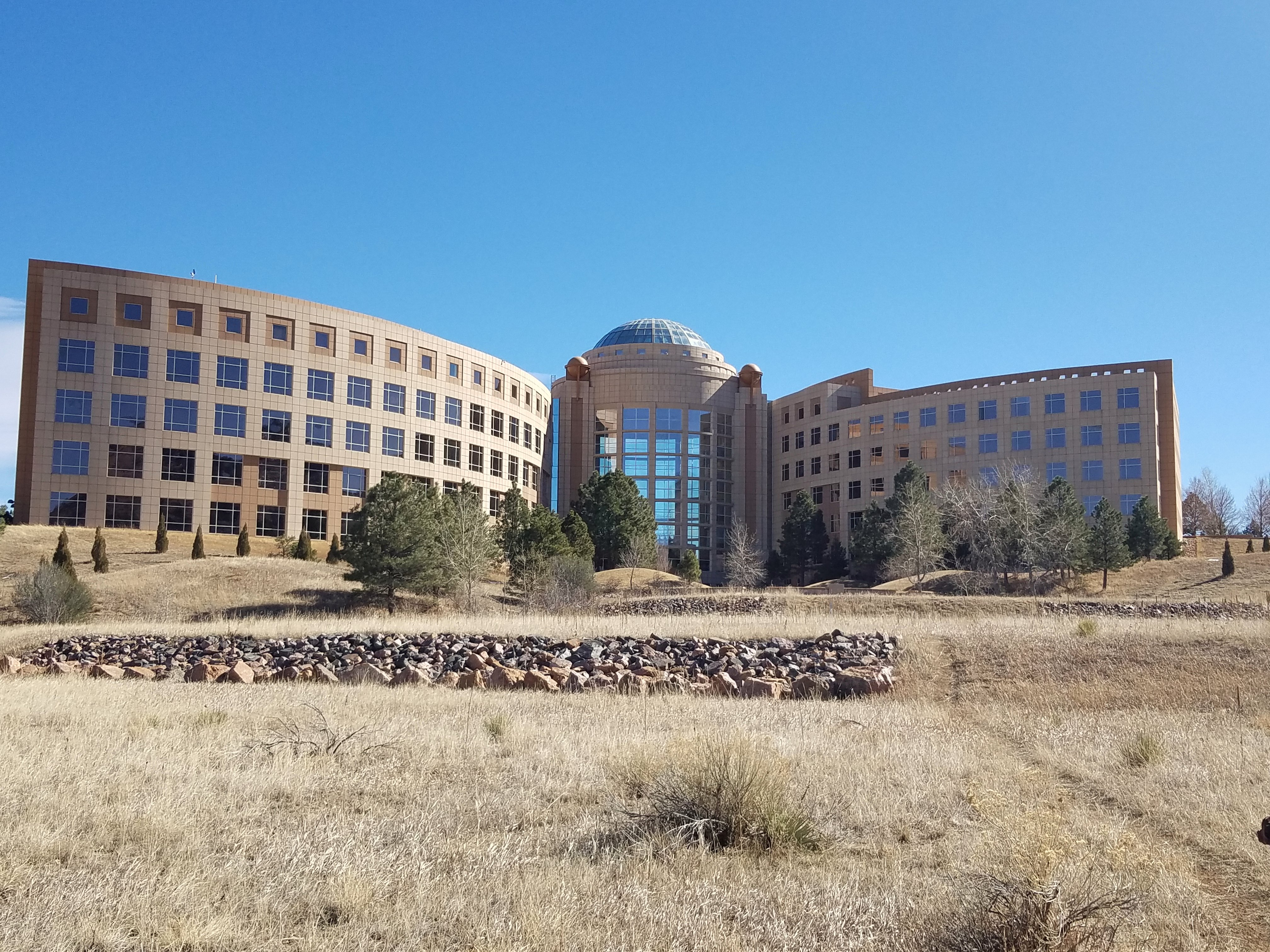
Northwest side of the Jefferson County Courthouse

Designed by Fentress Architects, the master plan for the 180-acre (0.73 km^{2}) campus was designed to give the county a seat of government at the heart of the county.

The Jefferson County Judicial and Administrative Facility overlooks the Human Services Building, a jail and numerous support facilities. The exterior features two-toned precast that blends with the nearby Rocky Mountain foothills while the interior contains natural cherry wood, terrazzo flooring and brass accents.
