= Dove Creek (Colorado) =

Stream in Dolores County, Colorado

Coordinates: 37°37′59″N 108°54′57″W

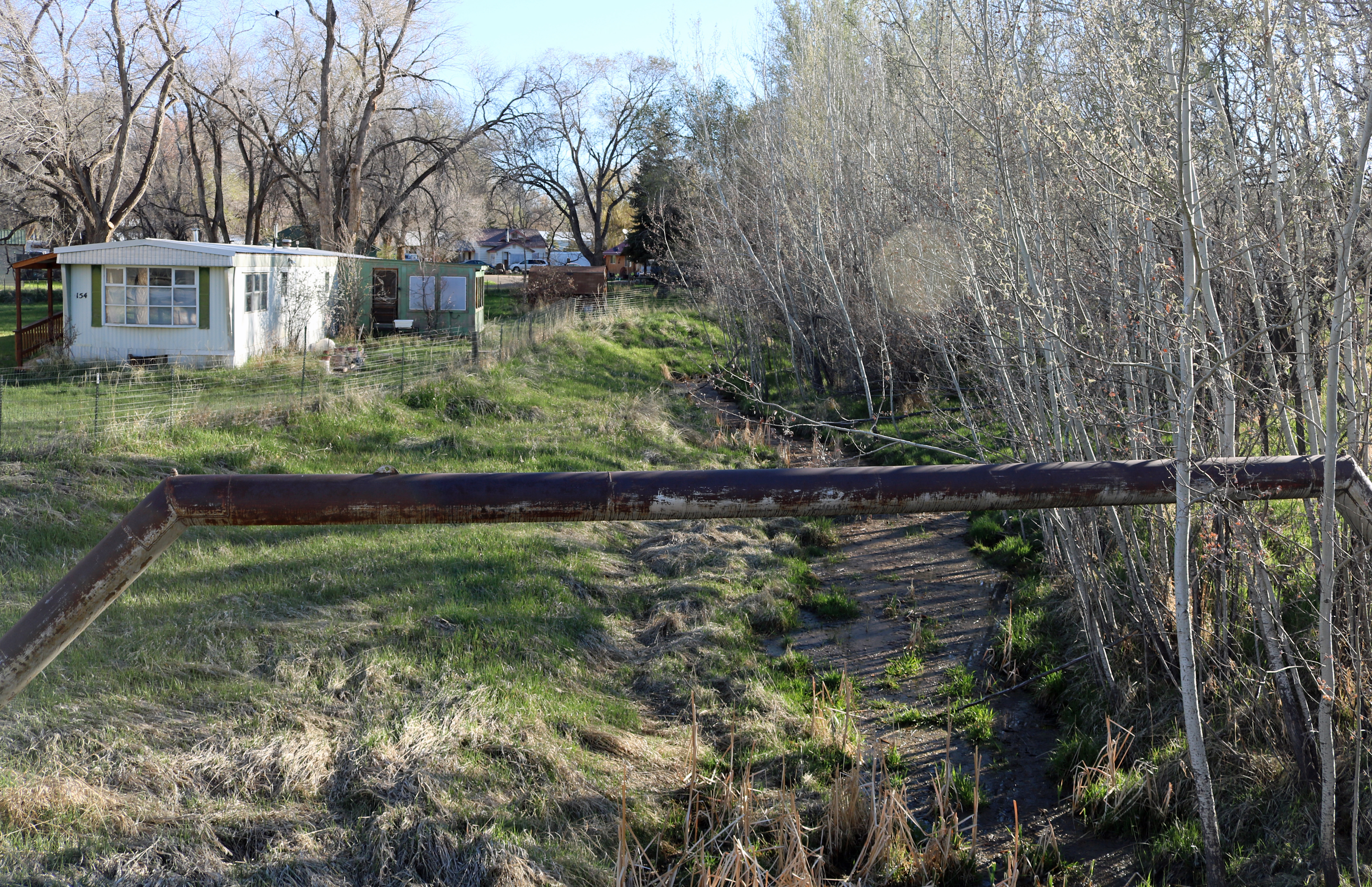
Dove Creek viewed from a bridge on Main Street in Dove Creek, Colorado

Dove Creek is a stream in Dolores County, Colorado, United States. It takes its name from the abundance of doves historically native to the area.

== See also ==
- List of rivers of Colorado
