= Perry station =

Light rail station in Denver, Colorado

Perry
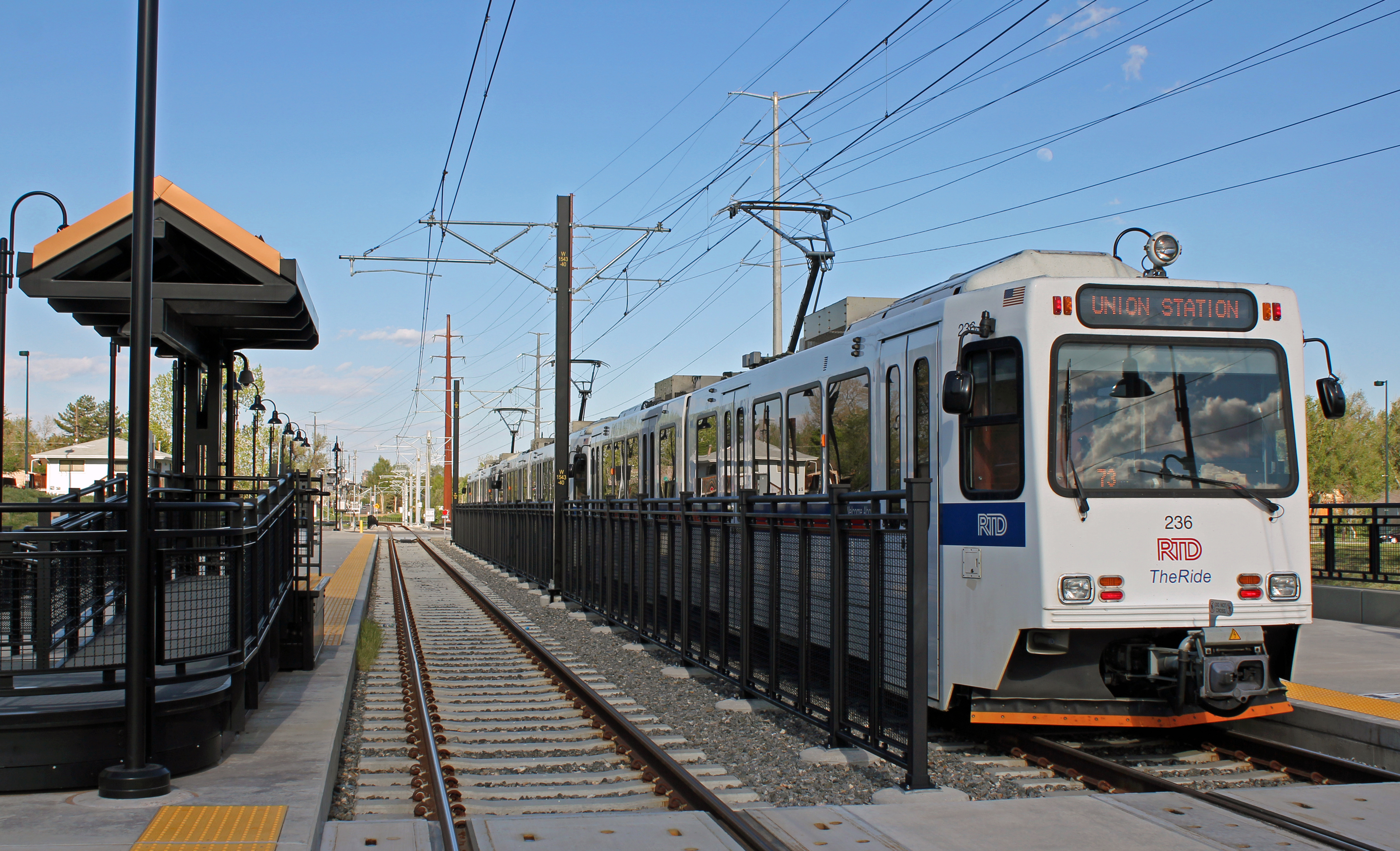
- Perry station platform

General information
- Location: 1199 North Perry Street; Denver, Colorado
- Coordinates: 39.7347°N 105.0400°W
- Owner: Regional Transportation District
- Line: West Corridor
- Platforms: 2 side platforms
- Tracks: 2

Construction
- Structure type: At grade
- Cycle facilities: 6 racks and 2 lockers
- Accessible: Yes

Other information
- Fare zone: Local

History
- Opened: April 26, 2013; 13 years ago

Passengers
- 2025: 484 (average daily)
- Rank: 60 out of 75

Services
Preceding station	RTD	Following station
Sheridan toward JeffCo Gov't Cntr•Golden	W Line	Knox toward Union Station
Location

Perry station is a light rail station on the W Line of the RTD rail system. It is located alongside the banks of the Lakewood Gulch at its intersection with Perry Street, after which the station is named, in Denver, Colorado. The station opened on April 26, 2013, and was built as part of the FasTracks public transportation expansion plan.

== Station layout ==
1F

Platform Level

Perry Street, east end of platform →
Side platform, doors will open on the right
Westbound
← toward Jeffco Government Center-Golden (Sheridan)
Eastbound
toward Union Station (Knox) →
Side platform, doors will open on the right

Perry station is located in Denver's Villa Park neighborhood and sits in a primarily single-family residential area. It has no bus connections or park-and-ride lot.
