= Knox station =

Light rail station in Denver, Colorado

Knox
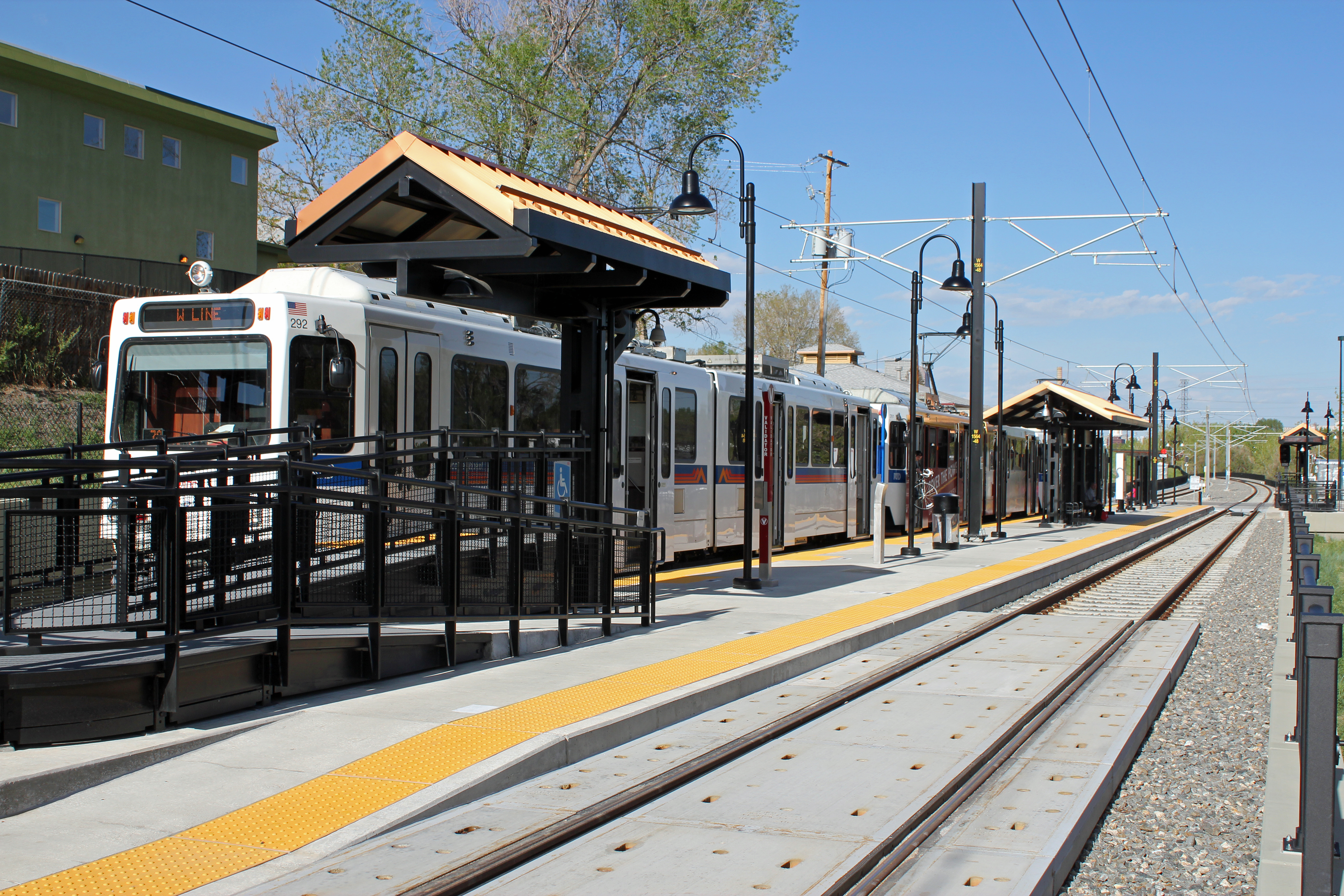
- Knox station platform, May 2013

General information
- Location: 1245 Knox Court; Denver, Colorado
- Coordinates: 39.7357°N 105.0329°W
- Owner: Regional Transportation District
- Line: West Corridor
- Platforms: 1 island platform
- Tracks: 2
- Connections: RTD Bus: 1

Construction
- Structure type: At-grade
- Cycle facilities: 6 racks

Other information
- Fare zone: Local

History
- Opened: April 26, 2013; 13 years ago

Passengers
- 2025: 662 (average daily)
- Rank: 48 out of 75

Services
| Preceding station | RTD | Following station |
|---|---|---|
| Perry toward JeffCo Gov't Cntr•Golden | W Line | Decatur–Federal toward Union Station |
Location

Knox station is a light rail station on the W Line of the RTD rail system. It is located alongside the banks of the Lakewood Gulch at its intersection with Knox Court. The station opened on April 26, 2013, and was built as part of the FasTracks public transportation expansion plan.

== Station layout ==
1F

Platform Level

Knox Court and bus bays, east end of platform →
Westbound
← toward Jeffco Government Center-Golden (Perry)
Island platform, doors will open on the left
Eastbound
toward Union Station (Decatur-Federal) →

Knox station is located in Denver's Villa Park neighborhood. The station has stops for RTD bus routes and has seen transit-oriented development, including a large apartment building.
