= Lamar station =

Lamar station may refer to:

- Lamar station (Amtrak), station in Lamar, Colorado
- Lamar station (RTD), station in Lakewood, Colorado
