= Sheridan station (RTD) =

Light rail station in Denver, Colorado

Sheridan
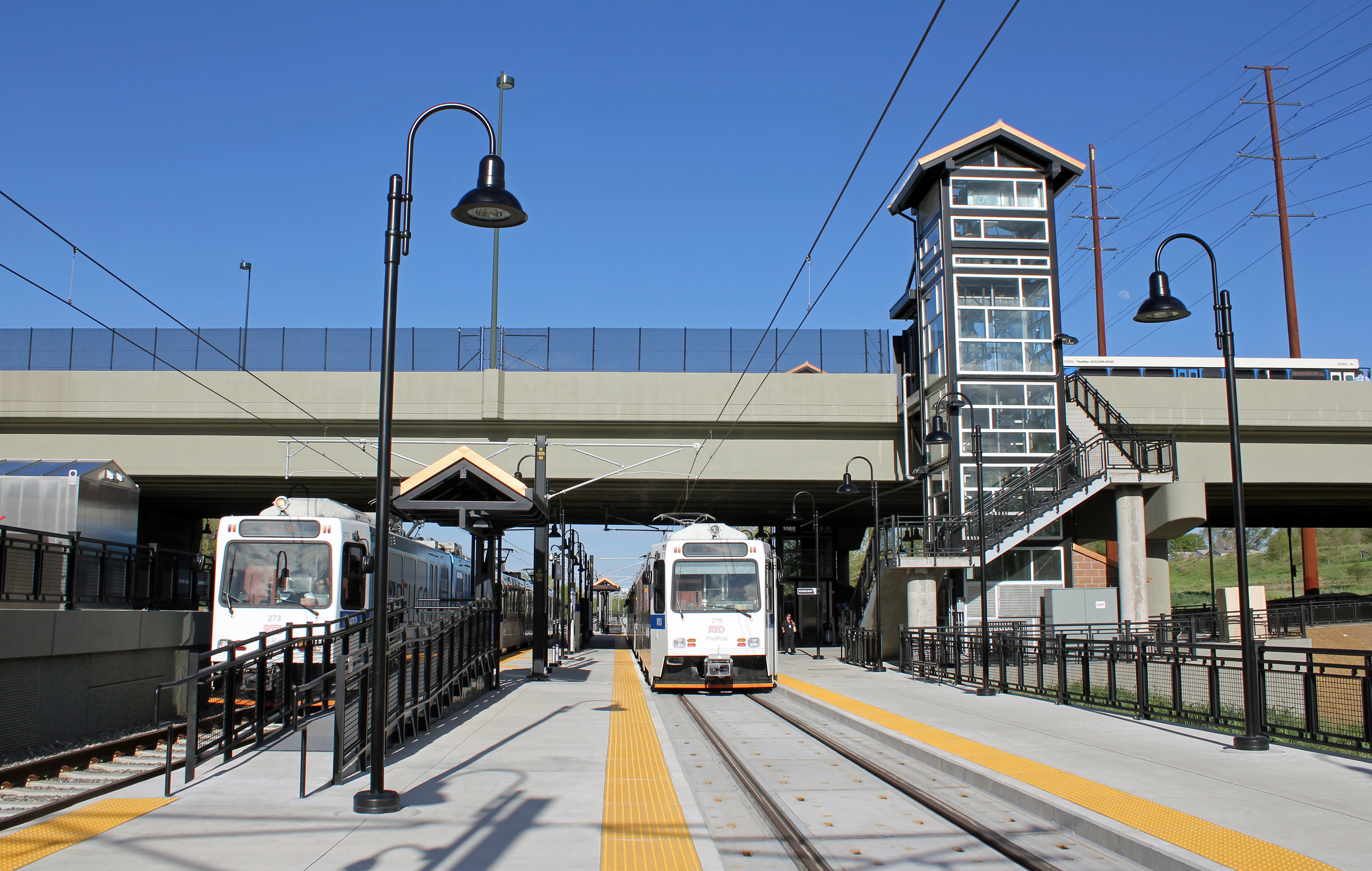
- Sheridan station platform, as seen from the Lakewood side of the station looking east towards Denver

General information
- Location: 1198 Sheridan Boulevard; Denver and Lakewood, Colorado
- Coordinates: 39.7351°N 105.0535°W
- Owner: Regional Transportation District
- Line: West Corridor
- Platforms: 1 side platform, 1 island platform
- Tracks: 2
- Connections: RTD Bus: 51

Construction
- Structure type: Below grade
- Parking: 800 spaces
- Cycle facilities: 8 racks and 8 lockers
- Accessible: Yes

Other information
- Fare zone: Local

History
- Opened: April 26, 2013; 13 years ago

Passengers
- 2025: 1,108 (average daily)
- Rank: 34 out of 75

Services
Preceding station	RTD	Following station
Lamar toward JeffCo Gov't Cntr•Golden	W Line	Perry toward Union Station
Location

Sheridan station is a light rail station on the W Line of the RTD rail system. It is located alongside the banks of the Lakewood Gulch under Sheridan Boulevard, after which the station is named. The station straddles Denver and Jefferson County, with a marking etched into the center of the platform to indicate the county line. The station opened on April 26, 2013, and was built as part of the FasTracks public transportation expansion plan.

== Station layout ==
2F
SH 95 / Sheridan Boulevard; bus bays; parking garage
1F

Platform Level

West 12th Avenue
Westbound
← toward Jeffco Government Center-Golden (Lamar)
Island platform, westbound only; doors will open on the left
Eastbound
toward Union Station (Perry) →
Side platform, eastbound only; doors will open on the right
Elevators and stairs to Sheridan Boulevard

The station is connected to Sheridan Boulevard by a pair of elevators and stairs on either side of the road, though both are located adjacent to the eastbound platform. From the stairs and elevators, passengers must cross the eastbound tracks to access the westbound platform. Bus connections can be found on either side of Sheridan Boulevard. The station also has an 800 space park and ride garage located on the west side of Sheridan Boulevard, south of the station and across Lakewood Gulch.

Sloan's Lake is located five blocks north of the station along Sheridan Boulevard, making this the closest station to its namesake park and neighborhood.
