= Decatur station (disambiguation) =

Decatur station is a MARTA rapid transit station in Decatur, Georgia.

Decatur station may also refer to:

- Decatur station (Arkansas), a historic railroad station in Decatur, Arkansas
- Decatur station (Illinois), a historic railway station in Decatur, Illinois
- Decatur–Federal station, a light rail station in Denver, Colorado
- Southern Railway Depot (Decatur, Alabama), a historic railway station in Decatur, Alabama
