= Empower Field at Mile High =

Stadium in Denver, Colorado

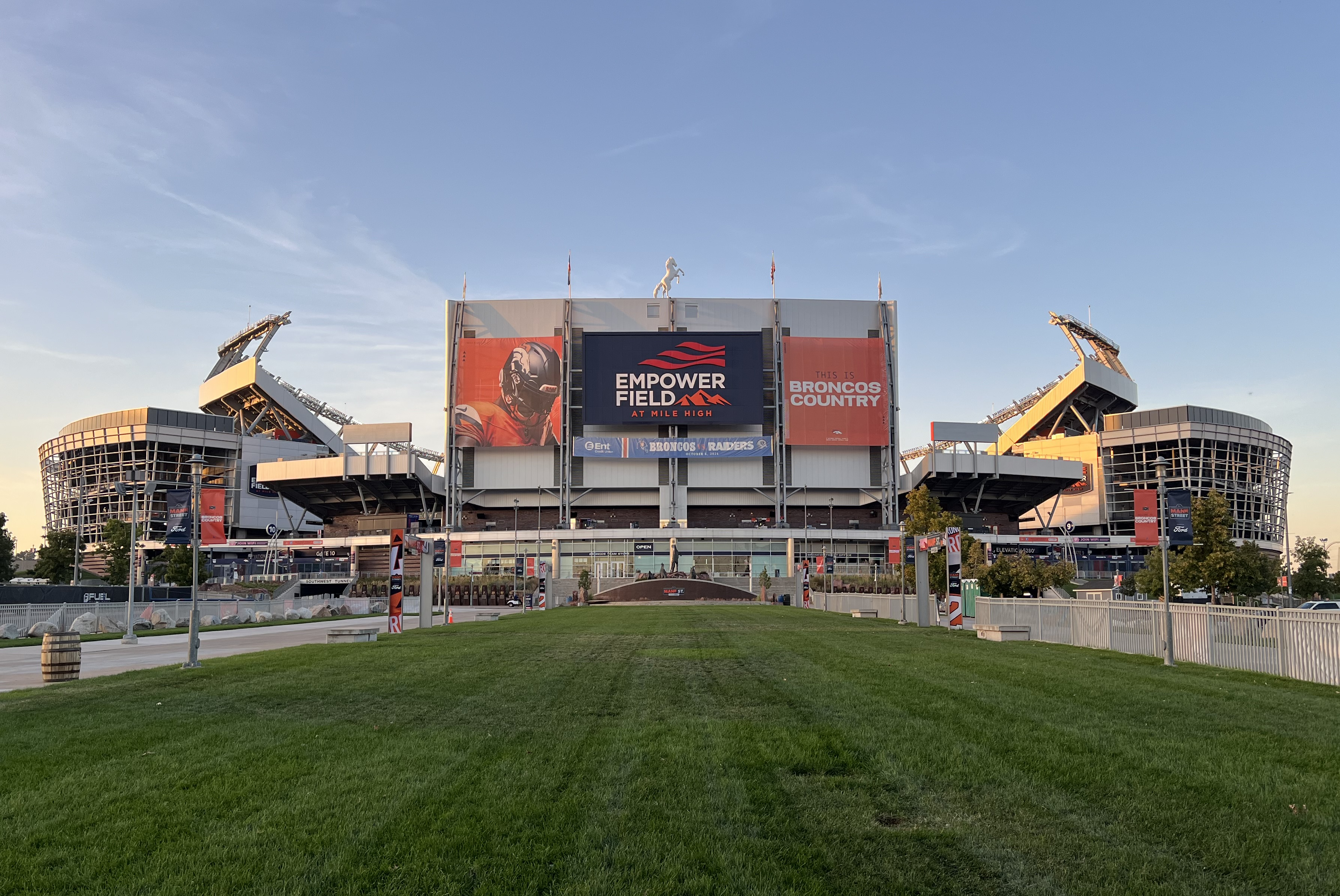
- Exterior view from the south in 2024

- Location in Colorado Location in the United States Location in North America
- Interactive map of Empower Field at Mile High
- Former names: Invesco Field (2001–2011); Sports Authority Field (2011–2018); Broncos Stadium (2018–2019)
- Address: 1701 Mile High Stadium Circle
- Location: Denver, Colorado, U.S.
- Coordinates: 39°44′38″N 105°1′12″W
- Elevation: 5,280 feet (1,610 m) AMSL
- Owner: Metropolitan Football Stadium District
- Capacity: 76,125 (football); 85,000+ (concerts)
- Executive suites: 132
- Surface: Desso GrassMaster (2001–2015); Kentucky bluegrass (2015–present)
- Record attendance: 85,233 (August 19, 2023; Ed Sheeran, +−=÷× Tour)
- Public transit: RTD: at Empower Field at Mile High at Decatur–Federal

Construction
- Groundbreaking: August 17, 1999; 27 years ago
- Opened: August 11, 2001; 25 years ago
- Cost: $400.9million ($774 million in 2025 dollars)
- Architects: HNTB; Fentress Architects; Bertram A. Burton and Associates
- Project manager: ICON Venue Group
- Structural engineer: Walter P Moore
- Services engineers: M-E Engineers, Inc.
- General contractors: Turner; Empire; Alvarado

Tenants
- Denver Broncos (NFL) (2001–present); Colorado Rapids (MLS) (2002–2006); Denver Outlaws (MLL) (2006–2019)

Website
- empowerfieldatmilehigh.com

Empower Field at Mile High (Note: Previously known as Broncos Stadium at Mile High, Invesco Field at Mile High and Sports Authority Field at Mile High and commonly known as Mile High, New Mile High or Mile High Stadium) is an American football stadium in the western United States, located in Denver, Colorado. Opened 25 years ago in 2001, its primary tenant is the Denver Broncos of the National Football League (NFL) and it replaced the Broncos' original home, Mile High Stadium.

The stadium is nicknamed "Mile High" due to its predecessor, in reference to Denver's elevation of one mile or 5,280 feet (1,610 m) above sea level. Given the difficulty of competing at altitude, as well as the notoriously loud fans, the Broncos are known to have one of the best home-field advantages in the NFL. Former tenants include the Denver Outlaws lacrosse team and the Colorado Rapids soccer team. It has also played host to many concerts, and was the venue for Barack Obama's acceptance of the Democratic presidential nomination at the 2008 Democratic National Convention.

After only three decades, the venue is expected to be replaced in 2031 by a new stadium in nearby Burnham Yard.

== Financing ==
=== Legislative effort ===
The Broncos' pursuit of the new stadium included a lobbying effort that included 13 lawyers and tens of thousands of dollars. This effort was directed at the passing of SB 171 which put Referendum 4A on the November 1998 ballot. SB 171 was sponsored by Representative Doug Dean (R) from Colorado Springs. Members of the state legislature claimed that this was one of the largest lobbying efforts they had seen.

In November 1998, Denver voters passed referendum 4A which was in favor of the construction of a new football stadium to replace the existing Mile High Stadium. The referendum was included on the ballots of six Colorado counties that comprise the Denver Metropolitan area. The referendum called for the extension of a tenth of a percent sales tax on transactions within the Metro area to go towards the cost of issuing a $224.9 million bond. This tax was originally established in 1990 when the Colorado Rockies sought public financing for Coors Field. Financing and construction for the stadium was monitored by the Metropolitan Football Stadium District (MFSD). The MFSD is a subdivision of the State of Colorado that, "was created for the purpose of planning, acquiring land and constructing a professional football stadium". The MFSD is also responsible for implementing the MFSD tax. The extension of the original stadium tax came into effect on January 1, 2001.

The funding deal between the Broncos and the State of Colorado called for the team to pay 25% of the estimated cost of $400 million while the state would pay the other 75% of the cost. Part of the agreement stipulated that the MFSD would collect half of the ten-year, $120 million naming rights deal with Invesco Funds Group. Upon Sports Authority's bankruptcy, the Broncos agreed to pay the MFSD $3.6 million to assume ownership of the naming rights of the stadium.

== Corporate partners ==
=== Naming rights ===
Invesco paid $120 million for the original naming rights in 2001, before Sports Authority secured them in August 2011.

Despite its sponsor's liquidation and closure in 2016, the Sports Authority name remained on the stadium for two years afterwards because of regulatory hurdles. The Broncos announced on January 2, 2018, that the stadium's exterior signage would be removed. The stadium took on a temporary name, Broncos Stadium at Mile High, for the remainder of 2018—including the 2018 NFL season—and part of 2019 before a new corporate naming rights agreement with Colorado-based Empower was announced on September 4, 2019.

=== Concessions ===
Concessions are currently run by Aramark Corporation. Aramark took over concession at the beginning of the 2019 season as Empower Retirement assumed the naming rights. As part of their offerings, Aramark has partnered with several Denver restaurants to provide a more robust selection of food options. The new partners include Frank Bonanno, a Denver restaurateur known for his many popular restaurants around downtown Denver.

== Improvements ==
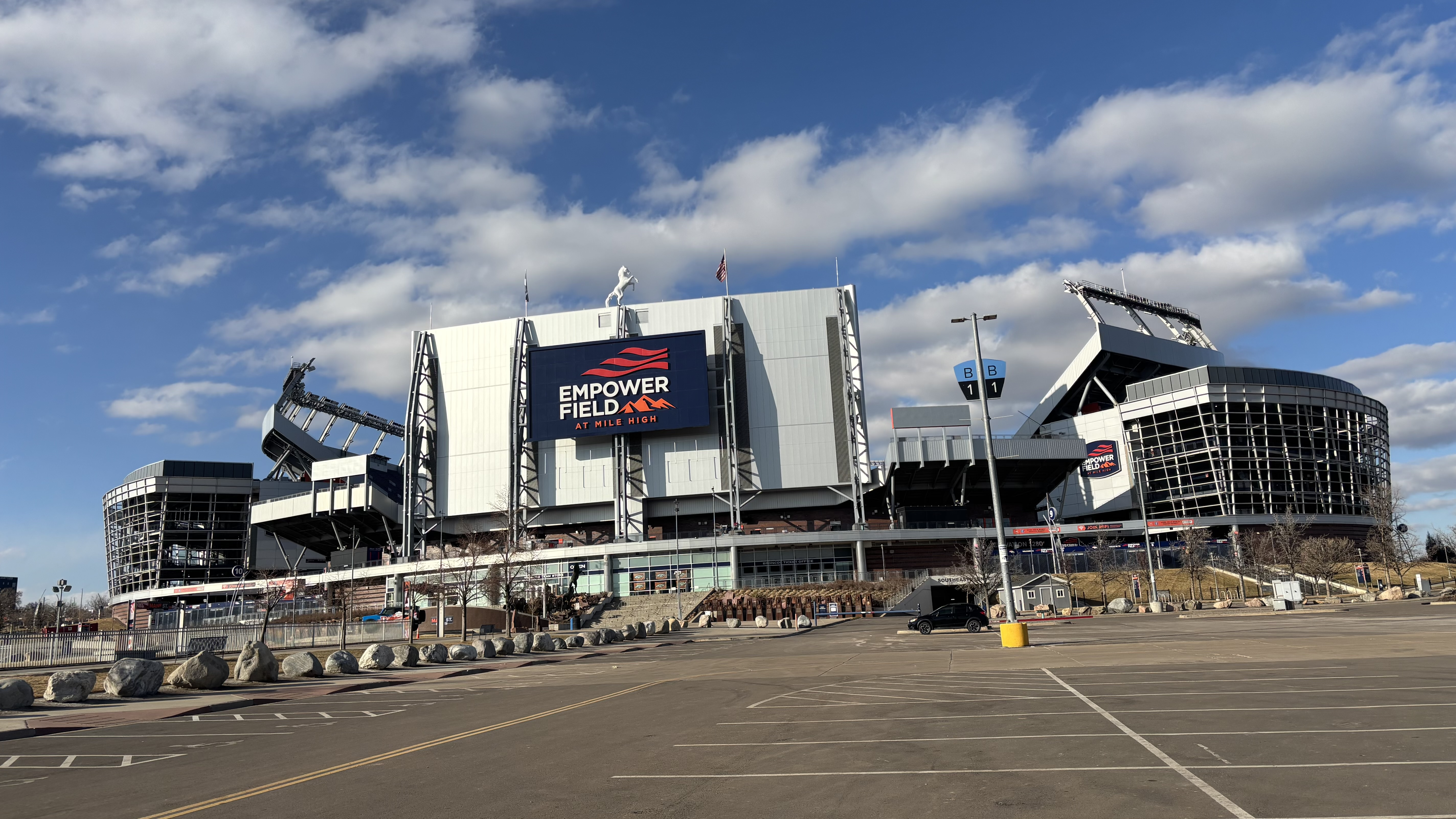
The stadium in February 2025

On December 21, 2012, the Broncos announced a $30 million renovation project prior to the start of the 2013 season, including a new HD LED video board on the stadium's south end zone that tripled the size of the video board used in the early 2000s.

In 2013, it was revealed that a Neil Smith Kansas City Chiefs jersey was buried somewhere near the 50-yard line by a couple of out-of-state contractors during renovations, despite Smith's play on the Broncos' Super Bowl XXXII- and XXXIII-winning teams. The curse the contractors hoped to create did not occur as the Broncos won another Super Bowl two years later, Super Bowl 50.

In an effort to be selected as a host city for the 2026 FIFA World Cup, the MFSD invested $8.3 million on stadium improvements to satisfy FIFA's requirements. Included in the improvements are the addition of LED lights as well as locker room and seating upgrades.

On December 14, 2022, the Broncos announced more than $100 million in upgrades to the stadium that would be completed during the off season and in time for the 2023 season. Upgrades include expanding the video board and an all-inclusive hospitality club on field level. In August 2023, the Broncos debuted the improvements, including the new scoreboard, measuring 225 feet (69 m) wide by 72 feet (22 m) tall, making it the fifth-largest screen in any NFL stadium.

== Controversies ==
Many citizens of the surrounding neighborhoods have expressed discontent with the impact of the stadium on their environment. Residents have complained about the increased traffic and frequent public urination by intoxicated fans on game days.

=== Naming rights ===
During construction of the new stadium, Denver mayor, Wellington Webb opposed the sale of the stadium's naming rights. At this time, the potential partners were AT&T, Janus Capital, and Invesco Funds Group. A group called Friends of Mile High created a poll asking whether fans preferred the old name or would be fine with a corporate sponsor. The poll found that 70% of respondents preferred to keep the name as Mile High despite a potential loss of $89 million in revenue for the state.

Many fans opposed a corporate name and wished to retain the previous venue's name, "Mile High Stadium." The Denver Post initially refused to use the Invesco label and referred to it as Mile High Stadium for several years before changing its policy and adding Invesco to articles.

On August 16, 2011, the Metropolitan Stadium District announced Invesco would immediately transfer the naming rights to Englewood-based Sports Authority in a 25-year agreement worth $6 million per year. In August 2016, the Denver Broncos paid $3,601,890 to the Metropolitan Football Stadium District to purchase the naming rights to the stadium. As the naming rights change began to occur, the MFSD sought permission to install larger signs on the newly named stadium. Residents of the neighborhood sought to block the installation of new signs due to concerns about further light pollution and the aesthetics of the retailer's logo.

In 2016, several Colorado legislators attempted to pass a bill in the Colorado State Legislature that would require the "Mile High" moniker regardless of any naming rights deal, citing the large public contribution to the stadium's construction; the bill failed to pass out of a Senate Committee in May 2016.

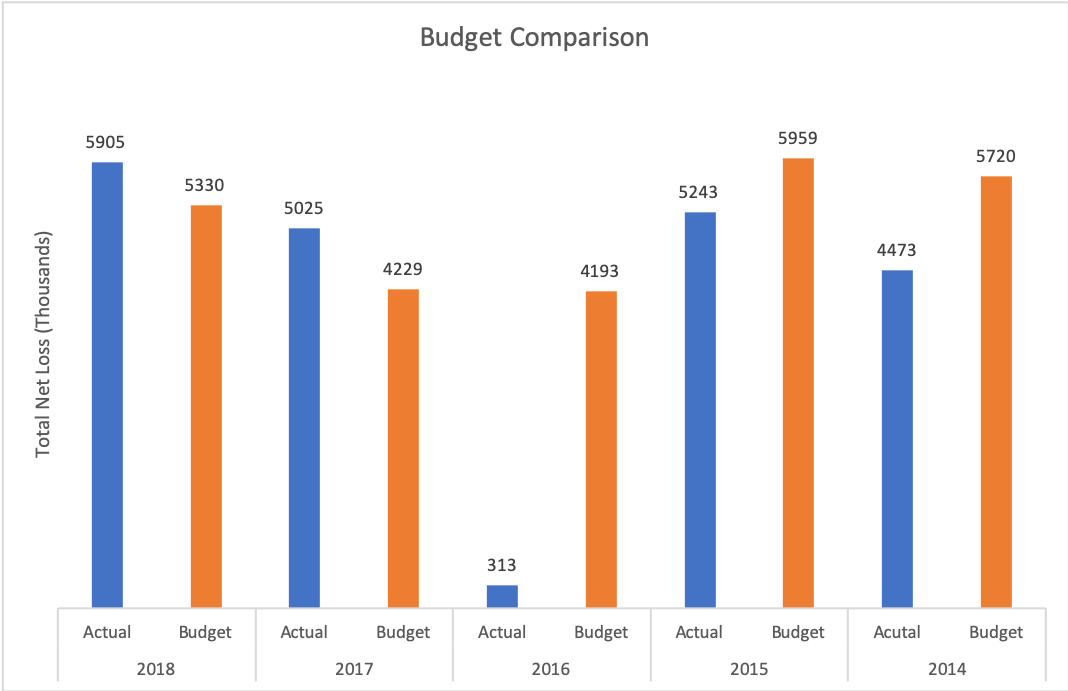
A comparison of the actual loss and the budgeted loss for the Metropolitan Football Stadium District for the years 2014 to 2018.

=== Financing ===
A 2016 study by the Brookings Institution has found that the federal government lost out on significant tax revenue in their deal with the Broncos to pay for the stadium. The study of 36 professional football stadiums found that the tax-exempt municipal bonds caused $49 million in lost tax revenue for the federal government. Additionally, the income tax break that bond holders could claim cost the government an additional $5 million.

== Usage ==
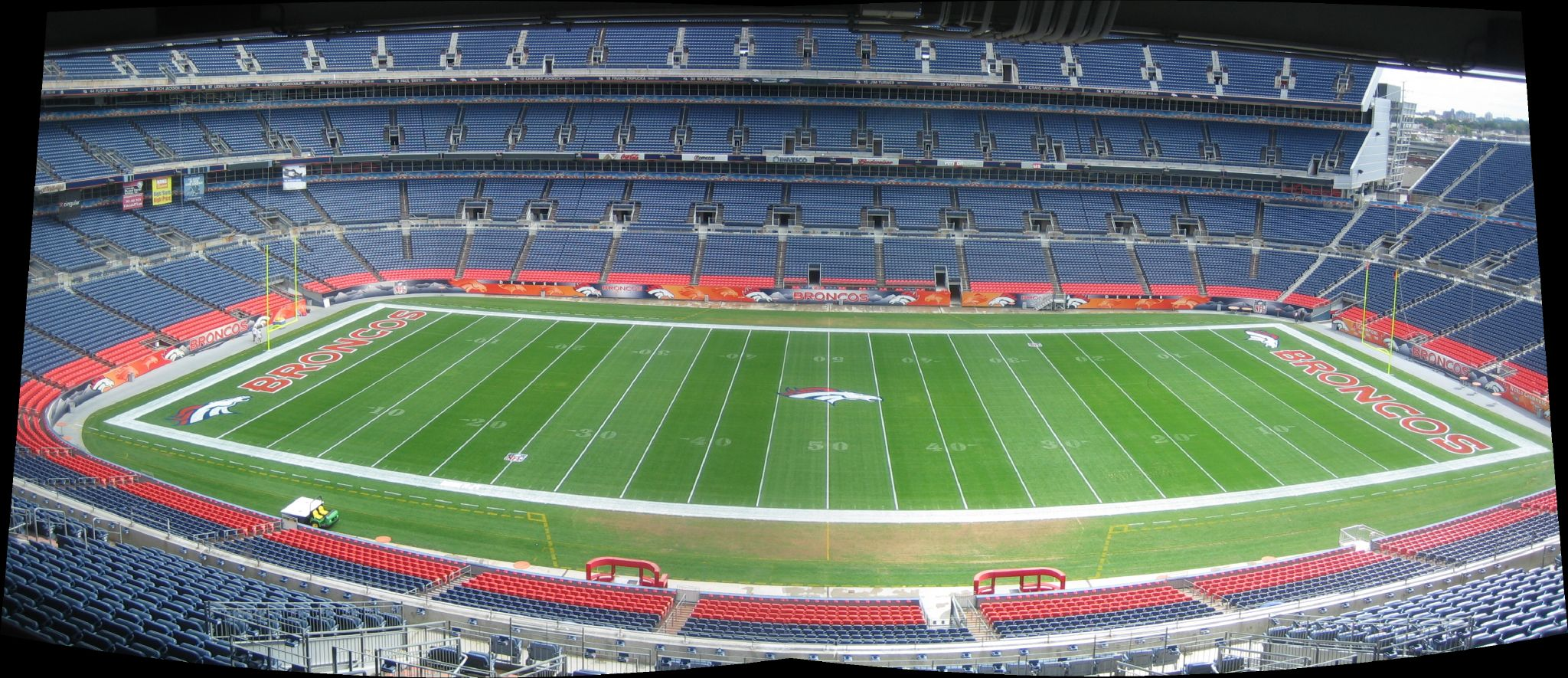
Playing surface for a Denver Broncos game, as seen in 2006

The stadium is used primarily for American football games. It is the home field for Denver's National Football League team, the Denver Broncos. The stadium previously hosted one of the city's Major League Lacrosse teams, the Denver Outlaws. In college football, it has hosted the rivalry game between the Colorado State University Rams and the University of Colorado Boulder Buffaloes. It has also been used for the CHSAA class 4A and 5A Colorado high school football state championship games, and has been used for the CBA Marching Band Finals.

In addition, it has been used for a Drum Corps International (DCI) Championship in 2004 and the annual Drums Along the Rockies competition. It is also used for concerts, music festivals and other events, and was home to the city's Major League Soccer franchise, the Colorado Rapids, before that team built and moved into Dick's Sporting Goods Park in suburban Commerce City.

On June 23, 2018, England played New Zealand in a rugby league match at the stadium. England won the match 36–18.

== Location ==
The construction of the stadium marked the completion of a six-year sporting venue upgrade program in Denver, including the construction of Coors Field and of Ball Arena. As with the other venues, the stadium was constructed to be easily accessible. It sits along Interstate 25 near the Colfax Avenue and 17th Avenue exits. It is also bordered by Federal Boulevard, a major Denver thoroughfare, on the west side. The stadium is served by two light rail stations: Empower Field at Mile High, served by the C, E, and W Lines, and Decatur-Federal, served exclusively by the W Line. The stadium is located in the Sun Valley neighborhood.

In September 2025, the team announced Burnham Yard, a 150-acre preferred site for their new stadium. This will be a privately funded operation by the Walton-Penner Family Ownership group. This will include an overhaul of major infrastructure in the surrounding area and is targeting an open date for the 2031 NFL Season.

== Stadium culture and traditions ==
The interior of the southern end of the stadium in October 2026, during a Thursday Night Football game between the Broncos and Seattle Seahawks. Denver won 17–14 in overtime.

A home game tradition (carried over from the original Mile High Stadium) is the "Incomplete Chant." At Broncos home games, when the opposing team throws an incomplete pass, the stadium announcer will state "Pass thrown by [the opposing quarterback] intended for [the opposing intended receiver] is..." at which time the fans complete the sentence by shouting "IN-COM-PLETE!!". The Broncos filed to register a trademark for the chant in 2020. In a tradition carried over from Mile High Stadium, the stadium's public-address announcer will give the final official attendance for the game, including the number of unused tickets; in response, Broncos fans "boo" the no-shows. During the stadium's first years, in another tradition that was carried over from Mile High, Broncos fans on one side of the stadium would chant "Go" and fans on the other side would respond "Broncos", back and forth chanting for several minutes. That tradition has since died out. Another long-term tradition is famed rowdiness of fans seated in the "South Stands", although this tradition has diminished significantly as well. Finally, especially in the upper two decks, the fans create their own 'Mile High Thunder' (and warm themselves) by stamping their feet on the stadium's floors. The old Mile High Stadium was built with bare metal, and the 'Thunder' reverberated readily. The new stadium was built with steel floors to preserve this unique acoustic feature.

The stadium also continued the tradition of displaying Bucky the Bronco, a 30-foot-high (9.1 m) replica of Roy Rogers' horse, Trigger, on top of the main scoreboard.

The stadium has sold out every Denver Broncos' home game since its inception in 2001, extending the "sold-out" streak that began during the team's tenure at Mile High Stadium, where every home game had been sold out since 1970 (though due to NFL policy, local TV broadcasts of sold-out games did not start until 1973).

== Notable events ==
=== NFL events ===
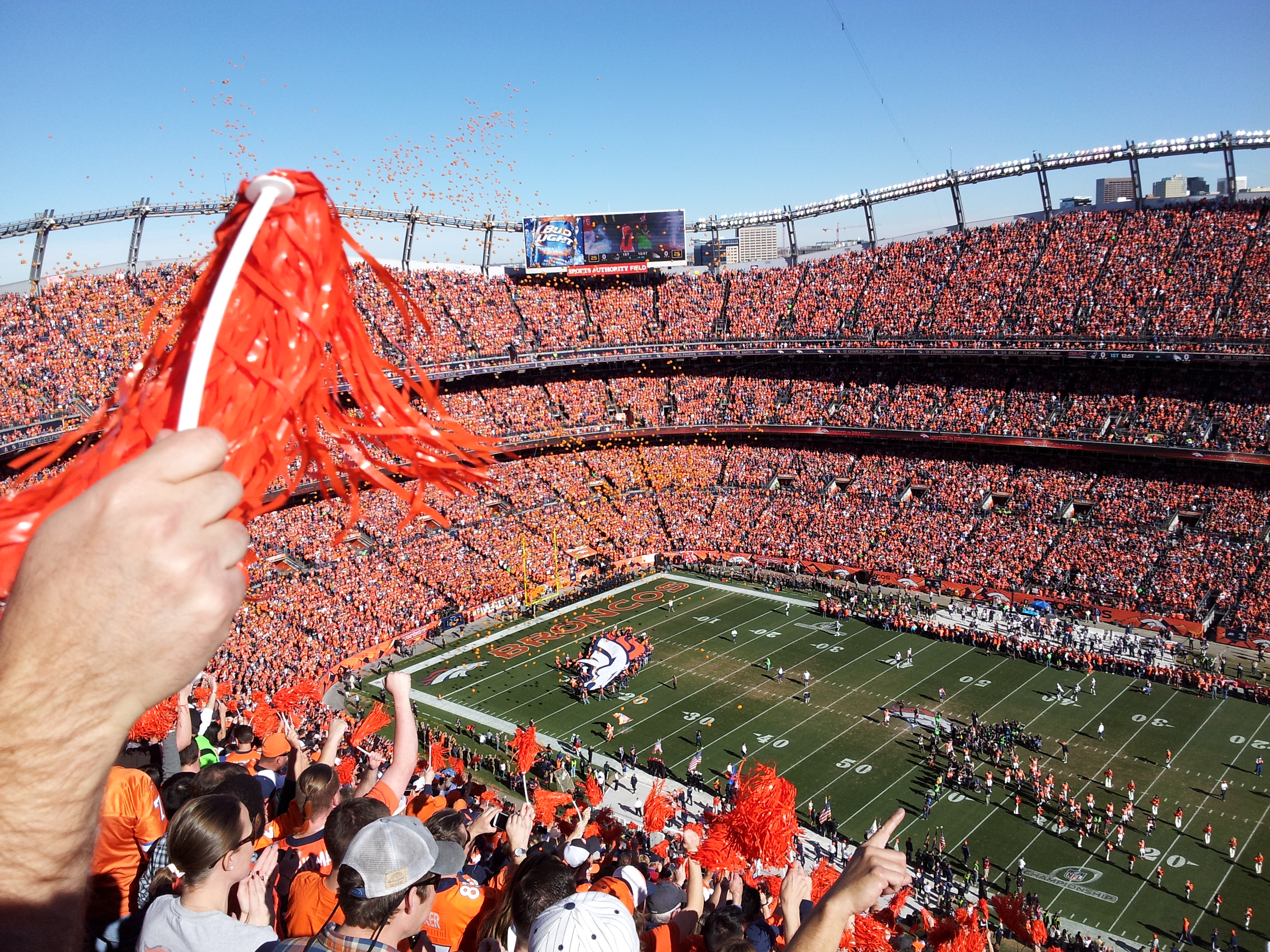
Interior view during the 2013 AFC Championship game

On September 10, 2001, the stadium hosted its first regular season NFL game, in which the Broncos defeated the New York Giants 31–20. In a pre-game ceremony, Broncos legends John Elway, Steve Atwater, Randy Gradishar, Haven Moses, Billy Thompson, Floyd Little, Dennis Smith, and Karl Mecklenburg helped to "Move the Thunder" from the old Mile High Stadium to the new home of the Broncos. As this inaugural game happened to fall on the day before 9/11, it has been referenced by survivor Pasquale Buzzelli in an interview with Joe Budden.

The stadium has hosted several NFL playoff games. It hosted the 2005 AFC Divisional playoff game, in which Denver defeated the New England Patriots 27–13. The following week, it hosted the AFC Championship Game, which the Broncos lost to the Pittsburgh Steelers, 34–17.

On October 29, 2007, a record crowd of 77,160 watched the Broncos lose to the Green Bay Packers 19–13 on Monday Night Football on the first play from scrimmage in overtime.

On November 26, 2009, it hosted its first Thanksgiving game, when the Broncos took on the Giants. The game was televised on NFL Network, which the Broncos won by a final score of 26–6.

On January 8, 2012, the stadium hosted its third NFL playoff game, an AFC Wild Card playoff game against the Steelers. The Broncos won in overtime, 29–23, with an 80-yard touchdown pass from Tim Tebow to Demaryius Thomas on the first play of overtime.

On January 12, 2013, the stadium hosted its fourth NFL playoff game, an AFC Divisional playoff game against the Baltimore Ravens. The Broncos lost to the Ravens 38–35 in double overtime in a game considered highly revered and historically iconic.

On January 19, 2014, the Broncos defeated the Patriots in the AFC Championship Game, 26–16 in front of 77,110 fans in attendance, advancing to their first Super Bowl since they began play in the new stadium.

On January 17, 2016, the Broncos defeated the Steelers in the AFC Divisional playoffs, 23–16 in front of 77,100, advancing to the AFC Championship Game for the 10th time in franchise history.

On January 24, 2016, the Broncos defeated the Patriots in the AFC Championship Game, 20–18 in front of 77,100, advancing to Super Bowl 50, which they won two weeks later.

On October 19, 2025, the Broncos led a historic comeback against the Giants, scoring 33 points in the 4th to win 33-32, in what would be known as the Mile High Meltdown.

On January 17, 2026, the stadium hosted a playoff game for the first time in a decade, with the Broncos defeating the Buffalo Bills in the AFC Divisional Round, winning in overtime 33–30. Denver would fall to New England 10–7 in the AFC Championship Game a week later.

=== Soccer ===
On July 26, 2014, Sports Authority Field at Mile High hosted a soccer match between Manchester United and A.S. Roma which was part of the 2014 International Champions Cup. Manchester United won the match 3–2. On March 28, 2026, a new National Women's Soccer League attendance record was set when 63,004 fans watched Denver Summit FC play the Washington Spirit.

Below is a list of international men's soccer games played at Empower Field at Mile High.

Date	Winning team	Result	Losing team	Tournament	Attendance
April 3, 2002	United States	1–0	Mexico	International Friendly	48,476
June 1, 2011	Mexico	3–0	New Zealand	International Friendly	45,401
July 14, 2013	Panama	0–0	Canada	2013 CONCACAF Gold Cup	30,000
July 14, 2013	Mexico	3–1	Martinique	2013 CONCACAF Gold Cup	30,000
July 26, 2014	(England) Manchester United	3–2	(Italy) A.S. Roma	2014 International Champions Cup	54,116
July 13, 2017	El Salvador	2–0	Curaçao	2017 CONCACAF Gold Cup	49,121
July 13, 2017	Mexico	0–0	Jamaica	2017 CONCACAF Gold Cup	49,121
June 19, 2019	Martinique	3–0	Cuba	2019 CONCACAF Gold Cup	52,874
June 19, 2019	Mexico	3–1	Canada	2019 CONCACAF Gold Cup	52,874
June 3, 2021	United States	1–0	Honduras	2021 CONCACAF Nations League Finals	34,451
June 3, 2021	Mexico	0–0 (5–4) pen.)	Costa Rica	2021 CONCACAF Nations League Finals	34,451
June 6, 2021	Honduras	2–2 (5–4) pen.)	Costa Rica	2021 CONCACAF Nations League Finals	37,648
June 6, 2021	United States	3–2 (a.e.t.)	Mexico	2021 CONCACAF Nations League Final	37,648
June 5, 2024	Uruguay	4–0	Mexico	International Friendly	57,852

=== Rugby league ===
The stadium hosted an international rugby league match between New Zealand and England on June 23, 2018.

Date	Winning Team	Score	Losing Team	Competition	Attendance
June 23, 2018	England	36–18	New Zealand	International Friendly	19,320

=== Concerts ===
The stadium has held several notable concerts.

Date	Artist	Opening act(s)	Tour / Concert name	Attendance	Revenue	Notes
August 11, 2001	Eagles	—	An Evening With the Eagles	54,217 / 54,217	$4,837,465	The first concert at the stadium
August 1, 2003	Metallica	Limp Bizkit; Linkin Park; Deftones; Mudvayne	Summer Sanitarium Tour	—	—	
September 25, 2003	Bruce Springsteen & The E Street Band	—	The Rising Tour	35,679 / 37,500	$2,442,072	
May 21, 2011	U2	The Fray	U2 360° Tour	77,918 / 77,918	$6,663,410	The show was originally to be held on June 12, 2010, but was postponed due to Bono's emergency back surgery.
July 21, 2012	Kenny Chesney; Tim McGraw	Grace Potter and the Nocturnals; Jake Owen	Brothers of the Sun Tour	50,020 / 50,020	$4,401,805	
July 20, 2013	Kenny Chesney; Eric Church	Eli Young Band; Kacey Musgraves	No Shoes Nation Tour	47,895 / 49,103	$3,349,330	
June 6, 2015	Luke Bryan	Florida Georgia Line; Randy Houser; Thomas Rhett; Dustin Lynch; DJ Rock	Kick the Dust Up Tour	50,539 / 50,539	$3,642,005	
August 8, 2015	Kenny Chesney; Jason Aldean	Brantley Gilbert; Cole Swindell; Old Dominion	The Big Revival Tour; Burn It Down Tour	54,674 / 54,674	$5,279,591	
June 7, 2017	Metallica	Avenged Sevenfold; Volbeat	WorldWired Tour	51,955 / 57,027	$6,299,803	
August 2, 2017	Guns N' Roses	Sturgill Simpson	Not in This Lifetime... Tour	41,445 / 44,806	$3,846,068	
May 25, 2018	Taylor Swift	Camila Cabello; Charli XCX	Taylor Swift's Reputation Stadium Tour	57,140 / 57,140	$7,926,366	Swift became the first-ever female artist to have a concert at the stadium.
June 30, 2018	Kenny Chesney	Thomas Rhett; Old Dominion; Brandon Lay	Trip Around The Sun Tour	51,553 / 53,983	$4,442,006	
August 4, 2018	Luke Bryan	Sam Hunt; Jon Pardi; Morgan Wallen	What Makes You Country Tour	51,756 / 60,328	$3,759,849	
June 8, 2019	Garth Brooks	Joe Nichols	The Garth Brooks Stadium Tour	84,000 / 84,000	$6,774,510	
August 10, 2019	The Rolling Stones	Nathaniel Rateliff & the Night Sweats	No Filter Tour	58,846 / 58,846	$13,494,183	This concert was originally scheduled to take place on May 26, 2019, but was postponed due to Mick Jagger recovering from a heart procedure.
July 23, 2022	Red Hot Chili Peppers	Haim; Thundercat	2022 Global Stadium Tour	49,617 / 49,617	$6,748,875	
July 30, 2022	Kenny Chesney	Dan + Shay Old Dominion Carly Pearce	Here and Now Tour			
August 18, 2022	The Weeknd	Kaytranada; Mike Dean	After Hours til Dawn Stadium Tour	TBA	TBA	
June 17, 2023	Illenium	Blanke; William Black	Trilogy: Colorado	54,161	$3,900,000	Largest EDM headliner event in US history
June 24, 2023	George Strait	Chris Stapleton; Little Big Town		59,663 / 59,663	$16,652,960	Second-highest-grossing concert in history as of August 2023
July 14, 2023	Taylor Swift	MUNA; Gracie Abrams	The Eras Tour			First act in history to sell out two shows on a single tour
July 15, 2023	Taylor Swift	MUNA; Gracie Abrams	The Eras Tour			First act in history to sell out two shows on a single tour
August 19, 2023	Ed Sheeran	Khalid; Cat Burns	+–=÷× Tour	85,233 / 85,233	$8,560,475	Holds record for largest crowd. Also, the show ended just after midnight the next day because of a weather delay.
June 14, 2024	Zach Bryan	Sierra Ferrell; Levi Turner	Quittin' Time Tour	110,321 / 110,321	$20,540,397	
June 15, 2024	Zach Bryan	Sierra Ferrell; Levi Turner	Quittin' Time Tour	110,321 / 110,321	$20,540,397	
June 20, 2024	The Rolling Stones	Widespread Panic	Hackney Diamonds Tour	53,780 / 53,780	$15,616,735	The Rolling Stones earned their highest-grossing concert of all time.
June 27, 2024	Morgan Wallen	Jon Pardi; Nate Smith; Bryan Martin	One Night At A Time World Tour			
June 28, 2024	Morgan Wallen	Jon Pardi; Nate Smith; Bryan Martin	One Night At A Time World Tour			
July 27, 2024	Kenny Chesney; Zac Brown Band	Megan Moroney; Uncle Kracker	Sun Goes Down 2024 Tour			
August 3, 2024	Foo Fighters	Pretenders; Mammoth WVH	Everything or Nothing at All Tour			
June 10, 2025	Coldplay	Willow; Elyanna	Music of the Spheres World Tour	62,580 / 62,580	$7,827,735	
June 15, 2025	Post Malone; Jelly Roll		Big Ass Stadium Tour	55,639 / 55,639	$8,527,843	
June 21, 2025	The Weeknd	Playboi Carti; Mike Dean	After Hours til Dawn Tour	63,668 / 63,668	$8,885,868	
June 27, 2025	Metallica	Limp Bizkit; Ice Nine Kills	M72 World Tour	151,692 / 154,378	$17,742,639	
June 29, 2025	Metallica	Pantera; Suicidal Tendencies	M72 World Tour	151,692 / 154,378	$17,742,639	
August 2, 2025	The Lumineers	Nathaniel Rateliff & The Night Sweats				
May 29, 2026	Morgan Wallen	Brooks & Dunn; Gavin Adcock; Vincent Mason	Still The Problem Tour			
May 30, 2026	Morgan Wallen	Ella Langley; Gavin Adcock; Vincent Mason	Still The Problem Tour			
June 26, 2026	Usher; Chris Brown			50,276 / 50,276	$7,456,411	
July 4, 2026	Ed Sheeran	Myles Smith; Aaron Rowe	Loop Tour			
July 28, 2026	AC/DC	The Pretty Reckless	Power Up Tour			
August 13, 2026	Zach Bryan	MJ Lenderman; Fey Fili	With Heaven On Tour			
August 14, 2026	Zach Bryan	MJ Lenderman; Fey Fili	With Heaven On Tour			
June 19, 2027	Luke Combs					
July 17, 2027	Kenny Chesney	Eric Church Sheryl Crow				

=== Other notable events ===
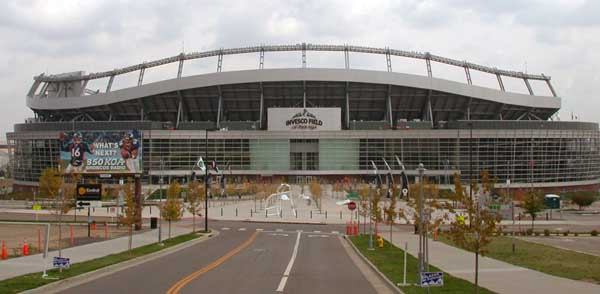
The main entrance of the stadium, when it was known as Invesco Field at Mile High

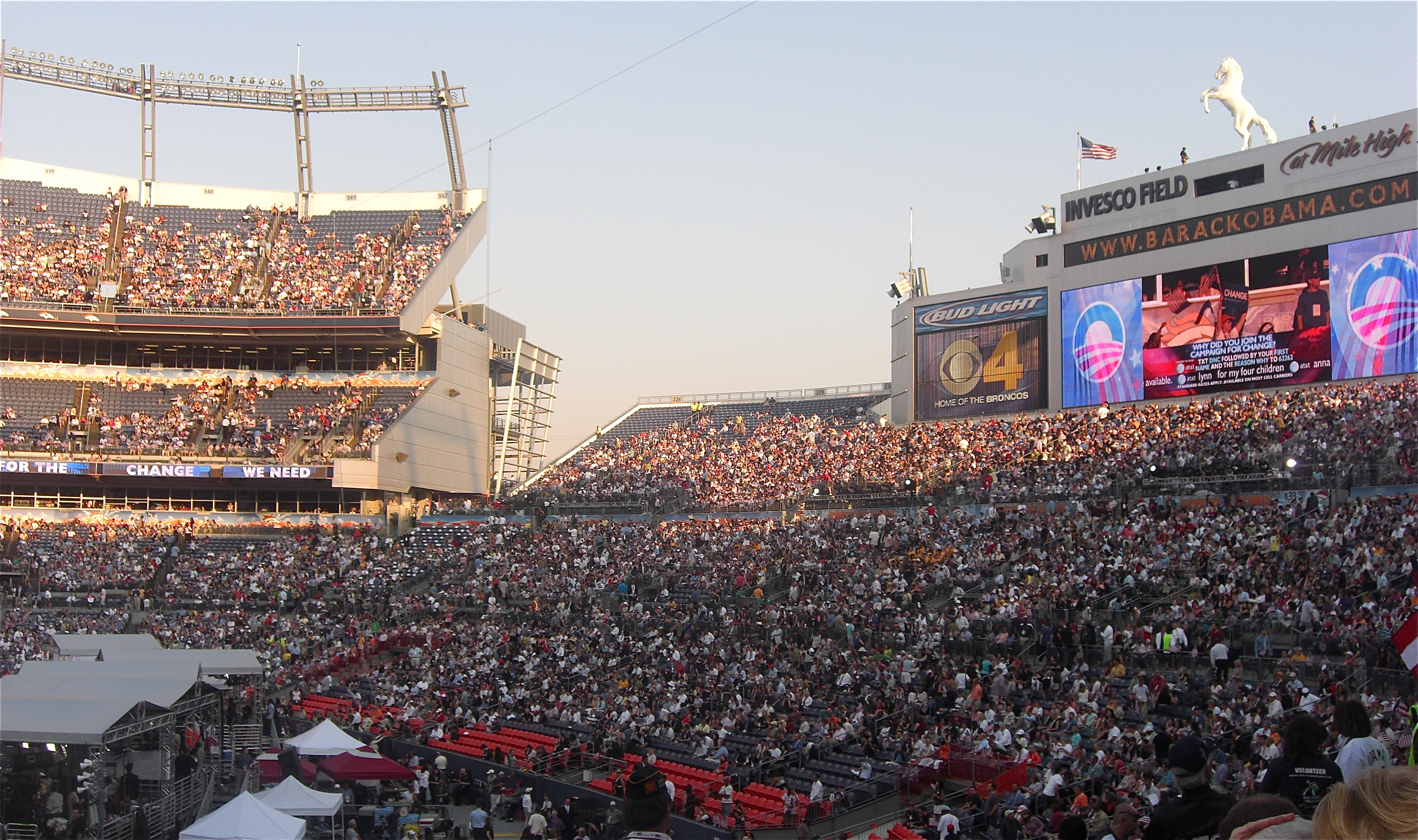
The south end zone as it looked during the final day of the 2008 Democratic National Convention

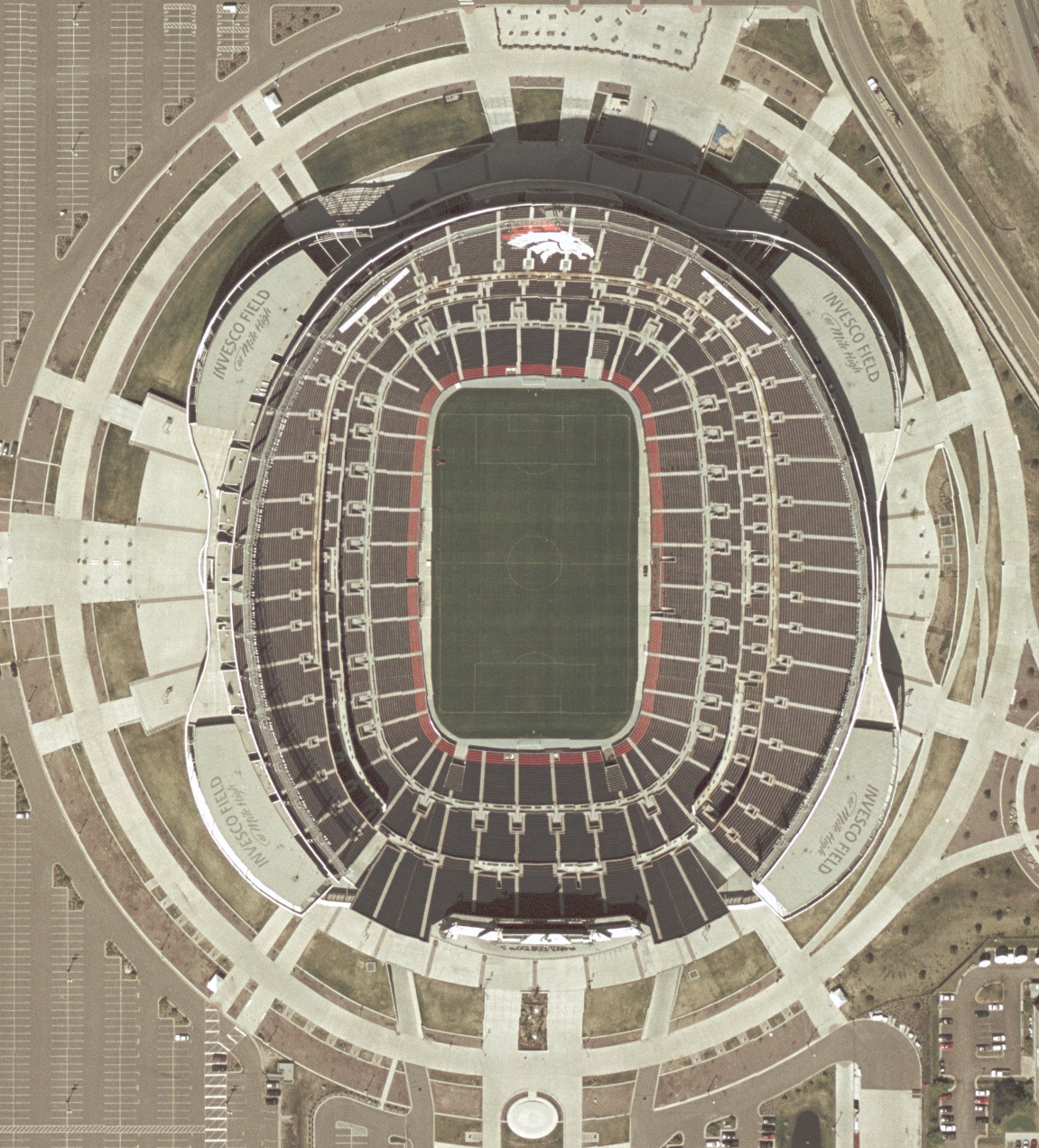
Satellite view of stadium

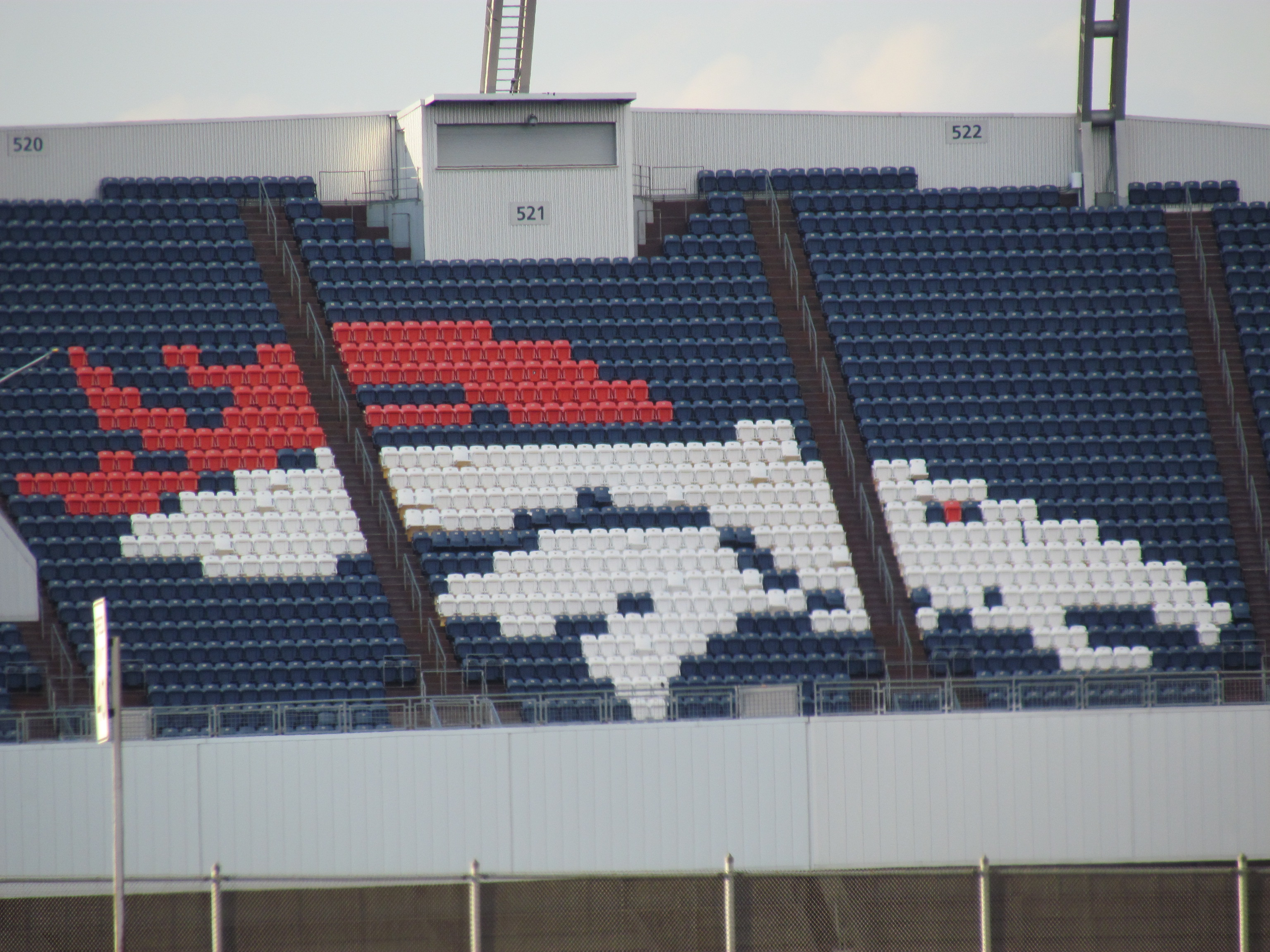
Detailed view of seats colored to form the Denver Broncos logo

The stadium has hosted other sports events. The first football game held (college, on September 1, 2001; attendance 75,022) was the Rocky Mountain Showdown, when the University of Colorado Buffaloes defeated the Colorado State University Rams 41–14. On July 2, 2005, it hosted the 2005 Major League Lacrosse All-Star Game. In 2006, Major League Lacrosse placed the expansion Outlaws in Denver.

In August 1977, 1978 and 2004, it hosted the Drum Corps International (DCI) World Championships, and every July hosts Drums Along the Rockies, which is a major competition in the annual DCI summer tour. Drums Along the Rockies is the longest-running event held at any Mile High named stadium, from 1963 through 2019. Although canceled in 2020 due to the COVID pandemic, the event returned in 2021.

On August 28, 2008, Democratic presidential nominee Barack Obama accepted the Democratic Party's nomination for President of the United States here, moving the 2008 Democratic National Convention from Ball Arena. Approximately 84,000 people attended Obama's speech, exceeding the normal capacity of the stadium due to the placement of audience on the field.

On April 13, 2019, the stadium hosted its first AMA Supercross Championship event.

On April 27, 2019, the stadium hosted its first Monster Jam show. On April 23, 2022, it hosted another.

The stadium was a candidate venue for the 2026 FIFA World Cup; however, it was not chosen by FIFA as one of the 16 venues to host the tournament.

== Denver Broncos Ring of Fame ==
The Denver Broncos Ring of Fame was created in 1984 by team owner Pat Bowlen to honor former players and administrators who played significant roles in the franchise's history. The names and years of service (and in most cases, jersey numbers) of the men inducted into the ring are displayed on the Level 5 facade of the stadium. There is no specific number of new members that may be chosen for induction in any given year; in many years, no new members were inducted.

Inducted or Enshrined in the Pro Football Hall of Fame

Denver Broncos Ring of Fame
No.	Name	Position(s)	Seasons	Inducted
23	Goose Gonsoulin	S	1960–66	1984
87	Rich Jackson	DE	1967–72	1984
44	Floyd Little	RB	1967–75	1984
87	Lionel Taylor	WR	1960–66	1984
–	Gerald Phipps	Owner	1961–81	1985
12	Charley Johnson	QB	1972–75	1986
70	Paul Smith	DE	1968–78	1986
18	Frank Tripucka	QB	1960–63	1986
36	Billy Thompson	S	1969–81	1987
7	Craig Morton	QB	1977–82	1988
25	Haven Moses	WR	1972–81	1988
15	Jim Turner	PK	1971–79	1988
53	Randy Gradishar	LB	1974–83	1989
57	Tom Jackson	LB	1973–86	1992
20	Louis Wright	CB	1975–86	1993
7	John Elway	QB; General manager	1983–98; 2011–2020	1999
77	Karl Mecklenburg	LB	1983–95	2001
49	Dennis Smith	S	1981–94	2001
65	Gary Zimmerman	OT	1993–97	2003
27	Steve Atwater	S	1989–98	2005
30	Terrell Davis	RB	1995–2001	2007
84	Shannon Sharpe	TE	1990–99, 2002–03	2009
80	Rod Smith	WR	1994–2006	2012
66	Tom Nalen	C	1994–2007	2013
21	Gene Mingo	RB, K, RS	1960–64	2014
–	Dan Reeves	Head coach	1981–92	2014
80	Rick Upchurch	WR, RS	1975–83	2014
–	Pat Bowlen	Owner	1984–2019	2015
1	Jason Elam	PK	1993–2007	2016
73	Simon Fletcher	LB/DE	1985–95	2016
47	John Lynch	S	2004–07	2016
—	Red Miller	Head coach	1977–80	2017
24	Champ Bailey	CB	2004–2013	2019
18	Peyton Manning	QB	2012–15	2021
88	Demaryius Thomas	WR	2010–18	2025

While the Ring of Fame was carried over from the old stadium to the new, the names were re-ordered to separate the inductees who served the team during the pre-Pat Bowlen (the team's owner until 2019 and founder of the Ring) era from those who served during Bowlen's ownership. One of the most noticeable changes was the move of John Elway's name to the center of the ring, located directly between the goalposts of the north end zone.

== Colorado Sports Hall of Fame Museum ==
The Colorado Sports Hall of Fame Museum opened in August 2001. It is located at Gate #1 on the west side of the stadium.

== 2022 fire ==
A fire broke out on March 24, 2022, destroying several sections of third row seats and fourth-level suites, though no injuries were reported. The fire caused damage to approximately "1,000 feet of seating." The cause of the fire was determined to be from a welding torch being used on an expansion joint. The fire also forced Empower Field at Mile High staff to reorganize events scheduled to take place at the stadium. The damage was said to be a "real challenge" to repair in time for the next Denver Broncos regular season, due to damage to steel risers and difficulties in procuring replacement materials.

== See also ==
- Ball Arena – Multi-purpose indoor arena in Denver
- Coors Field – Baseball stadium in Denver, Colorado
- Dick's Sporting Goods Park – Soccer stadium in Commerce City, Colorado, US
- Lists of stadiums
- McNichols Sports Arena – Demolished indoor arena in Denver, Colorado
- Mile High Stadium – Former stadium in Denver, Colorado, US
- National Sports Center for the Disabled – U.S. non-profit organization

Events and tenants
Preceded by Mile High Stadium	Home of the Denver Broncos; 2001–present	Succeeded by Current
Preceded by Mile High Stadium	Home of the Denver Outlaws; 2006–2019	Succeeded by Last Venue
Preceded by Mile High Stadium	Home of the Colorado Rapids; 2002–2006	Succeeded by Dick's Sporting Goods Park
Preceded by Citrus Bowl	Host of the Drum Corps International; World Championship; 2004	Succeeded by Gillette Stadium
Preceded by Heinz Field; Gillette Stadium; Gillette Stadium; Arrowhead Stadium	Host of AFC Championship Game; 2006; 2014; 2016; 2026	Succeeded by RCA Dome; Gillette Stadium; Gillette Stadium; TBD
Preceded by None	CONCACAF Nations League Finals Venue; 2021; Empower Field at Mile High	Succeeded by TBD
