= Sheridan station =

Sheridan station may refer to:

- Sheridan station (CTA), an 'L' station in Chicago, Illinois
- Sheridan station (RTD), a light rail station in Denver, Colorado
- Sheridan Street station, a commuter rail station in Hollywood, Florida
- Christopher Street–Sheridan Square station, a subway station in New York City, New York
- Fort Sheridan station, a commuter rail station in Fort Sheridan, Illinois
- Oxford–City of Sheridan station, a light rail station in Sheridan, Colorado
