= Decatur–Federal station =

Light rail station in Denver, Colorado

Decatur•Federal
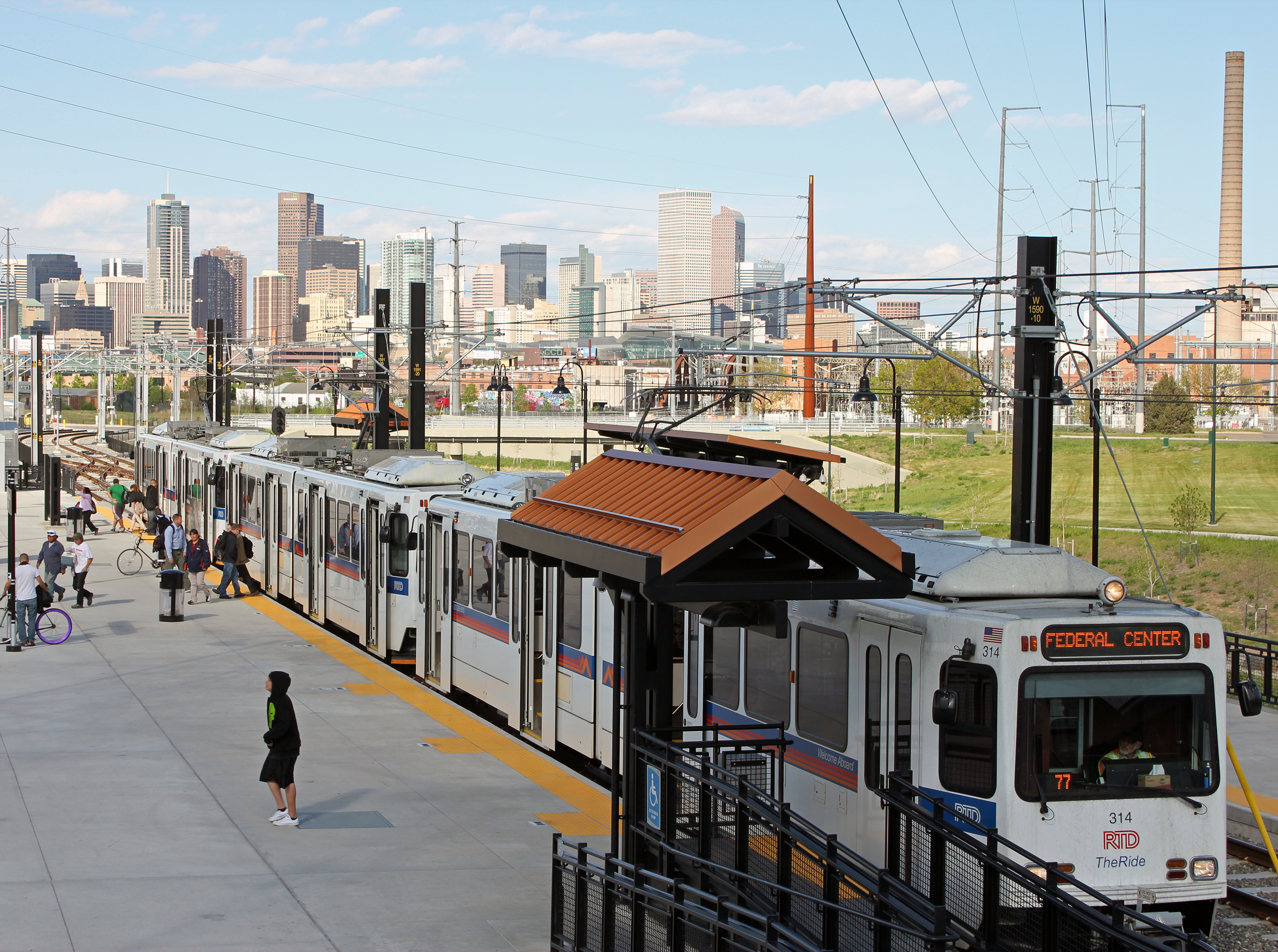
- Decatur–Federal station platform, May 2013

General information
- Other names: Decatur•Federal
- Location: 1310 North Federal Boulevard; Denver, Colorado
- Coordinates: 39°44′14″N 105°01′27″W
- Owner: Regional Transportation District
- Line: West Corridor
- Platforms: 2 side platforms
- Tracks: 2
- Connections: RTD Bus: 15L, 16, 30, 31, Platte Valley FlexRide

Construction
- Structure type: At-grade
- Parking: 474 spaces
- Cycle facilities: 10 racks and 20 Lockers
- Accessible: Yes

Other information
- Fare zone: Local

History
- Opened: April 26, 2013; 13 years ago

Passengers
- 2025: 1,480 (average daily)
- Rank: 24 out of 75

Services
Preceding station	RTD	Following station
Knox toward JeffCo Gov't Cntr•Golden	W Line	Auraria West toward Union Station
Location

Decatur–Federal station (sometimes stylized as Decatur•Federal) is a light rail station on the W Line of the RTD rail system. It is located between Decatur Street and Federal Boulevard, after which the station is named, in the Sun Valley neighborhood of Denver, Colorado. It is one of two light rail stops that serve Empower Field at Mile High, the home stadium of the Denver Broncos. The station opened on April 26, 2013, and was built as part of the FasTracks public transportation expansion plan.

== Station layout ==
1F

Platform Level

SH 88 / Federal Boulevard; Empower Field at Mile High; bus bays; parking
Side platform, doors will open on the right
Westbound
← toward Jeffco Government Center-Golden (Knox)
Eastbound
toward Union Station (Auraria West) →
Side platform, doors will open on the right

The station sits alongside the banks of the Lakewood Gulch, near the point where it meets the South Platte River. The station is adjacent to Rude Park to the south and Paco Sanchez Park to the west.

Empower Field at Mile High is located approximately 2,100 feet north of the station, on the other side of Colfax Avenue. Despite not being the primary station serving the stadium, it is only around 200 feet further from it than Empower Field at Mile High station and is 2 stops closer on the W Line to points west (such as Lakewood and Golden). The station has a multi-gate bus transfer plaza served by RTD bus routes, and a 474 space park and ride lot.
