= Lakewood–Wadsworth station =

Light rail station in Lakewood, Colorado

Lakewood•Wadsworth
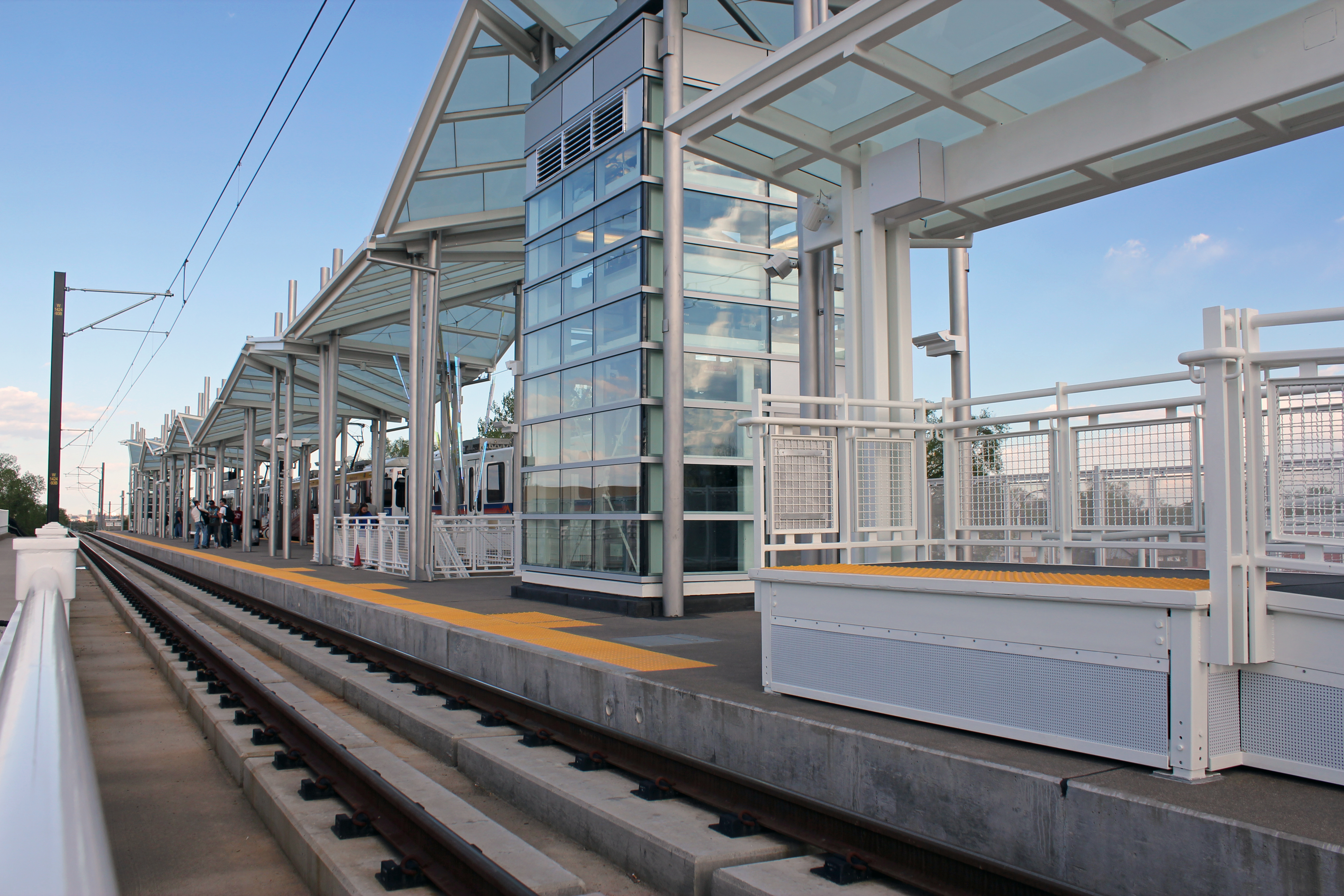
- Lakewood–Wadsworth station platform, located on a bridge over Wadsworth Boulevard

General information
- Location: 1298 Wadsworth Boulevard; Lakewood, Colorado
- Coordinates: 39.7366°N 105.0814°W
- Owner: Regional Transportation District
- Line: West Corridor
- Platforms: 1 island platform
- Tracks: 2
- Connections: RTD Bus: 9, 76

Construction
- Structure type: Elevated
- Parking: 1,000 spaces
- Cycle facilities: Racks and lockers
- Accessible: Yes

Other information
- Fare zone: Local

History
- Opened: April 26, 2013; 13 years ago

Passengers
- 2025: 1,625 (average daily)
- Rank: 21 out of 75

Services
Preceding station	RTD	Following station
Garrison toward JeffCo Gov't Cntr•Golden	W Line	Lamar toward Union Station
Location

Lakewood–Wadsworth station (sometimes stylized as Lakewood•Wadsworth) is a light rail station on the W Line of the RTD rail system. It is located along an elevated viaduct over West 13th Avenue and Wadsworth Boulevard in Lakewood, Colorado. The station opened on April 26, 2013, and was built as part of the FasTracks public transportation expansion plan.

== Station layout ==
2F

Platform Level

Westbound
← toward Jeffco Government Center-Golden (Garrison)
Island platform, doors will open on the left
Eastbound
toward Union Station (Lamar) →
1F
SH 121 / Wadsworth Boulevard; bus bays; parking garage

The station is located two blocks south of West Colfax Avenue, and is the site of transit-oriented development. A 1,000 space park and ride garage sits adjacent to the station to its northeast. Bus connections can be found on either side of Wadsworth Boulevard.
