= Sun Valley, Denver =

Neighborhood in Denver, Colorado, United States

Coordinates: 39.7356°N 105.0218°W

Sun Valley on this map of Denver's neighborhoods

Sun Valley is a neighborhood in central Denver, Colorado, bordered by I-25 on the east, Federal Blvd. on the west, 6th Avenue on the south, and 20th Ave. on the north. It is located in the area known as West Denver.

== Neighborhood characteristics ==
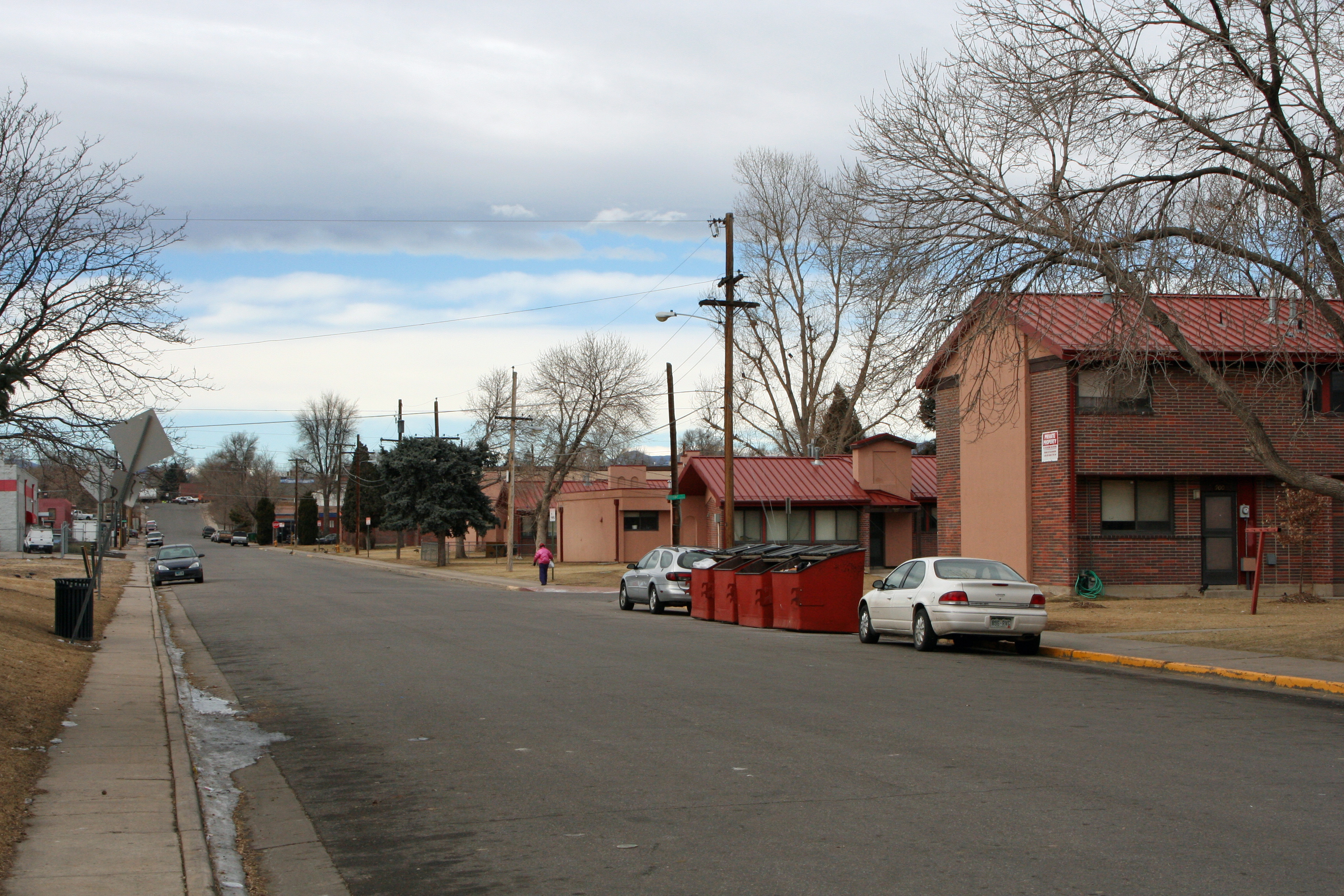
A view of a street in Denver's Sun Valley neighborhood. On the right is some of the area's public housing.

Much of Sun Valley's population (94% according to the 2000 census) resides in 10 blocks dominated by publicly subsidized housing. Only about 5% of the neighborhood's population live in owner occupied units. Much of the rest of the neighborhood consists of industrial areas, parks, city service buildings and Empower Field at Mile High and its surrounding parking lots. According to the 2000 census, Sun Valley's population was 1,496, representing a 2.6% increase over the 1990 population. Children make up 54% of the population, making Sun Valley the only Denver neighborhood where minors outnumber adults.

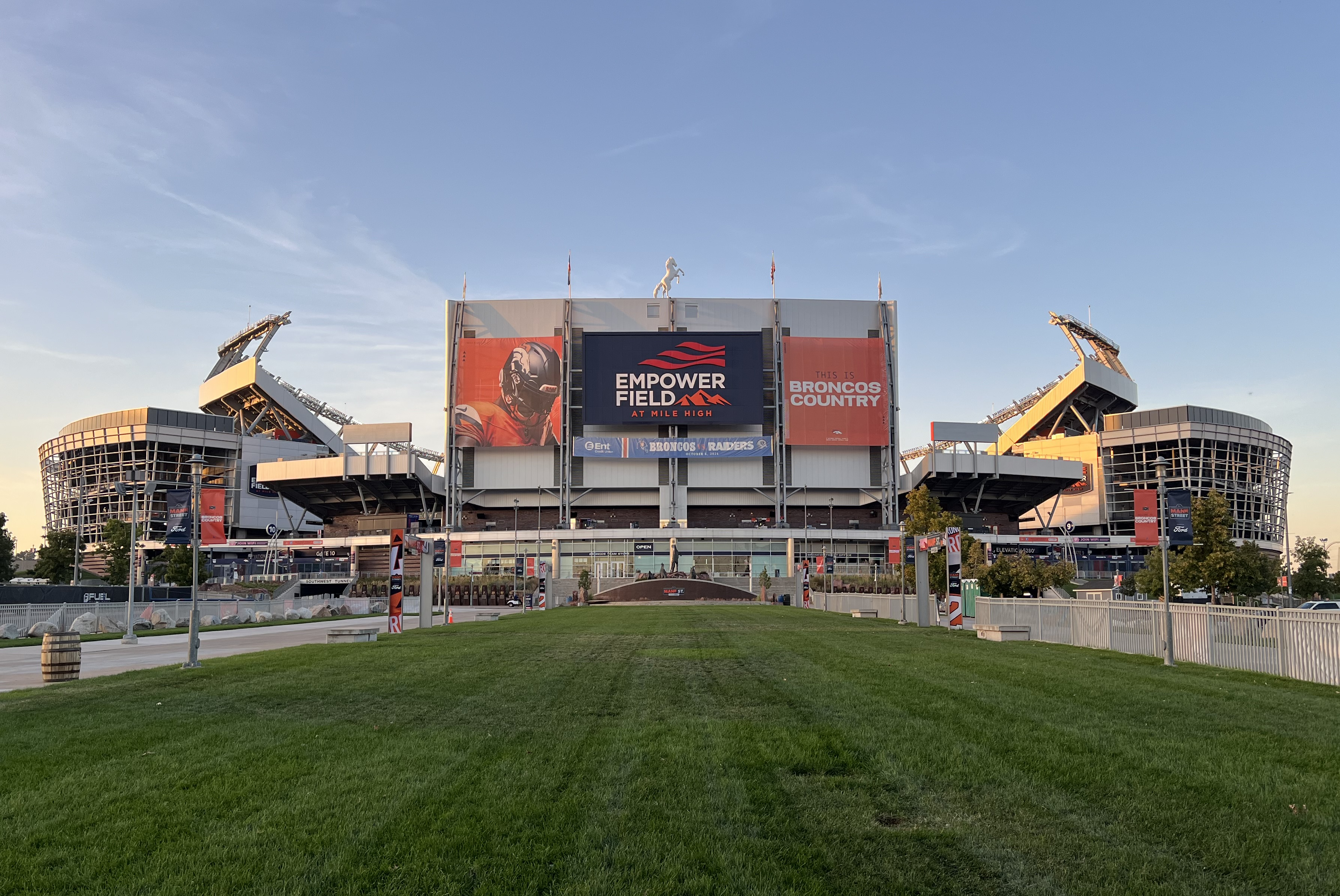
The Sun Valley neighborhood includes Empower Field at Mile High, an American football stadium.

Lakewood Gulch traverses the neighborhood, ending at the South Platte River just south of Colfax Avenue. The gulch travels through Rude Park at the west side of the neighborhood. The park contains a recreation center, bike paths, and a baseball field. The bike path meets the gulch between Decatur Street and the South Platte, but has been closed since 2007 because of a flash flood there that took the life of a toddler. Sun Valley contains a single stop (the Decatur-Federal station) of the FasTracks West Corridor Light Rail line at Decatur Street.

== Demographics ==
The 2000 Census found that Sun Valley is overwhelmingly made up of families with children as 70% of all Sun Valley households were families with children less than 18. Median age was 15.7. In large part the high number of children with families is due to the publicly subsidized housing dominant in the neighborhood which gives preference to low-income families. Indeed, the poverty rate in Sun Valley is five times higher than the city of Denver as a whole with 71.5% of its residents living in poverty compared with 14.3% of all Denverites.

The Sun Valley neighborhood consists of Census tract 8 (See: http://projects.nytimes.com/census/2010/map). The demographics of the tract were 8% White, 26% Black, 54% Hispanic, 8% Asian, 1% Native American, and 3% Multiracial. The population was 1,448, and the population density was 2,261 people per square mile, with most of the population being concentrated in the public housing centered on 10th Avenue. There were 501 housing units, of which none were vacant.

== See also ==
- Bibliography of Colorado
- Geography of Colorado
- History of Colorado
- Index of Colorado-related articles
- List of Colorado-related lists
  - List of neighborhoods in Denver
  - List of populated places in Colorado
- Outline of Colorado
