= Lamar station (RTD) =

Light rail station in Lakewood, Colorado, United States

Lamar
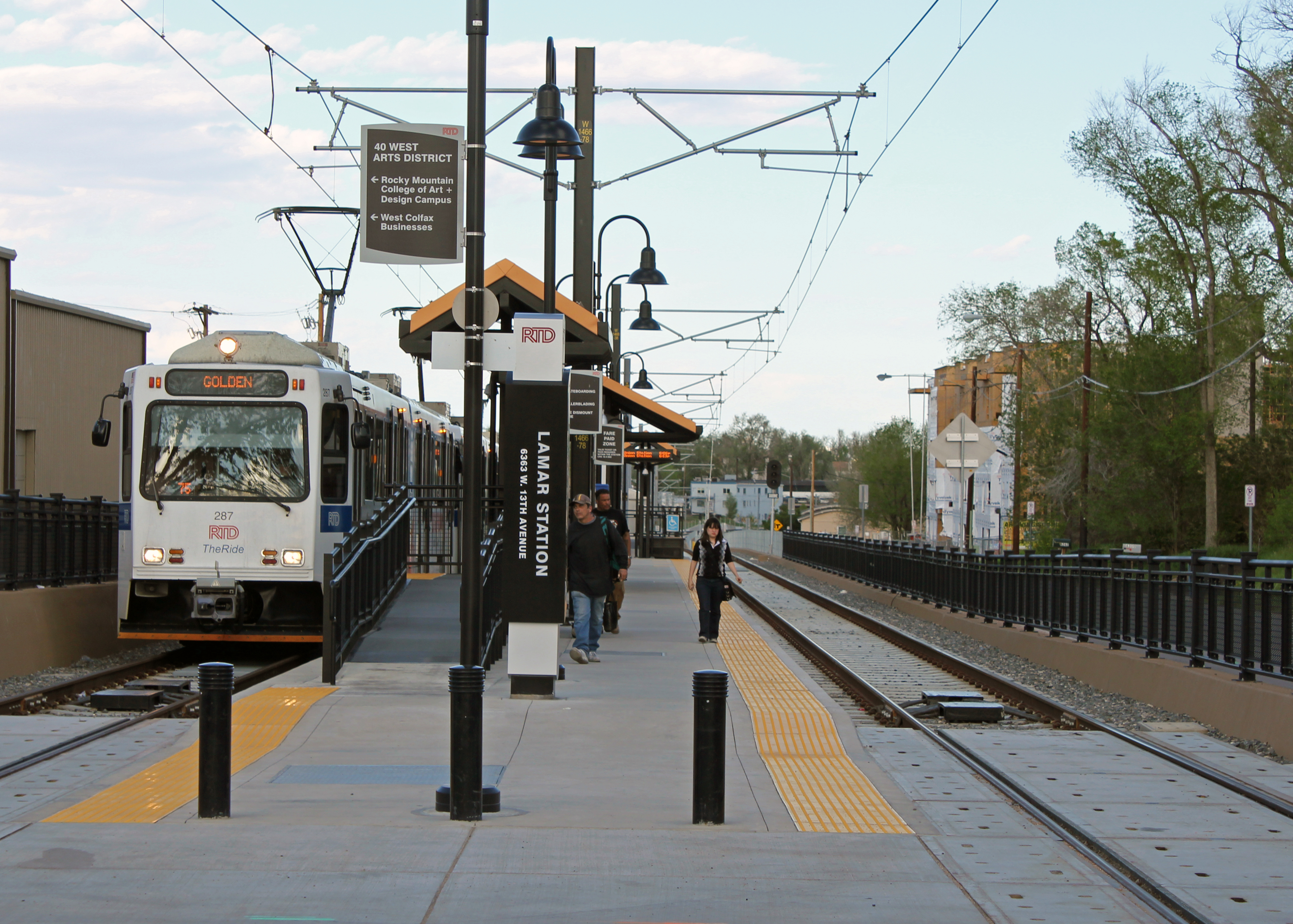
- Lamar station platform, May 2013

General information
- Location: 6363 W 13th Avenue; Lakewood, Colorado
- Coordinates: 39.7367°N 105.0666°W
- Owner: Regional Transportation District
- Line: West Corridor
- Platforms: 1 island platform
- Tracks: 2
- Connections: RTD Bus: 9

Construction
- Structure type: At-grade
- Accessible: Yes

Other information
- Fare zone: Local

History
- Opened: April 26, 2013; 13 years ago

Passengers
- 2025: 781 (average daily)
- Rank: 42 out of 75

Services
Preceding station	RTD	Following station
Lakewood–Wadsworth toward JeffCo Gov't Cntr•Golden	W Line	Sheridan toward Union Station
Location

Lamar station is a light rail station on the W Line of the RTD rail system. It is located near the intersection of West 13th Avenue and Lamar Street, after which the station is named, in Lakewood, Colorado. The station opened on April 26, 2013, and was built as part of the FasTracks public transportation expansion plan.

== Station layout ==
1F

Platform Level

← Lamar Street and bus bays, west end of platform
Westbound
← toward Jeffco Government Center-Golden (Lakewood-Wadsworth)
Island platform, doors will open on the left
Eastbound
toward Union Station (Sheridan) →

The station is located within Lakewood's 40 West Arts District, and is approximately 1,300 feet south of a large shopping center on West Colfax Avenue, anchored by Casa Bonita. It is about 0.7 miles (1.1 km) from the campus of the Rocky Mountain College of Art and Design, which is located north of the aforementioned shopping center.

The area around Lamar station has seen transit-oriented development, including three joint housing and retail buildings. The W Line bikeway runs along the north side of the station, while painted bike lanes run north from the station to West Colfax Avenue.
