= W Line (RTD) =

Light rail line in the Denver metropolitan area

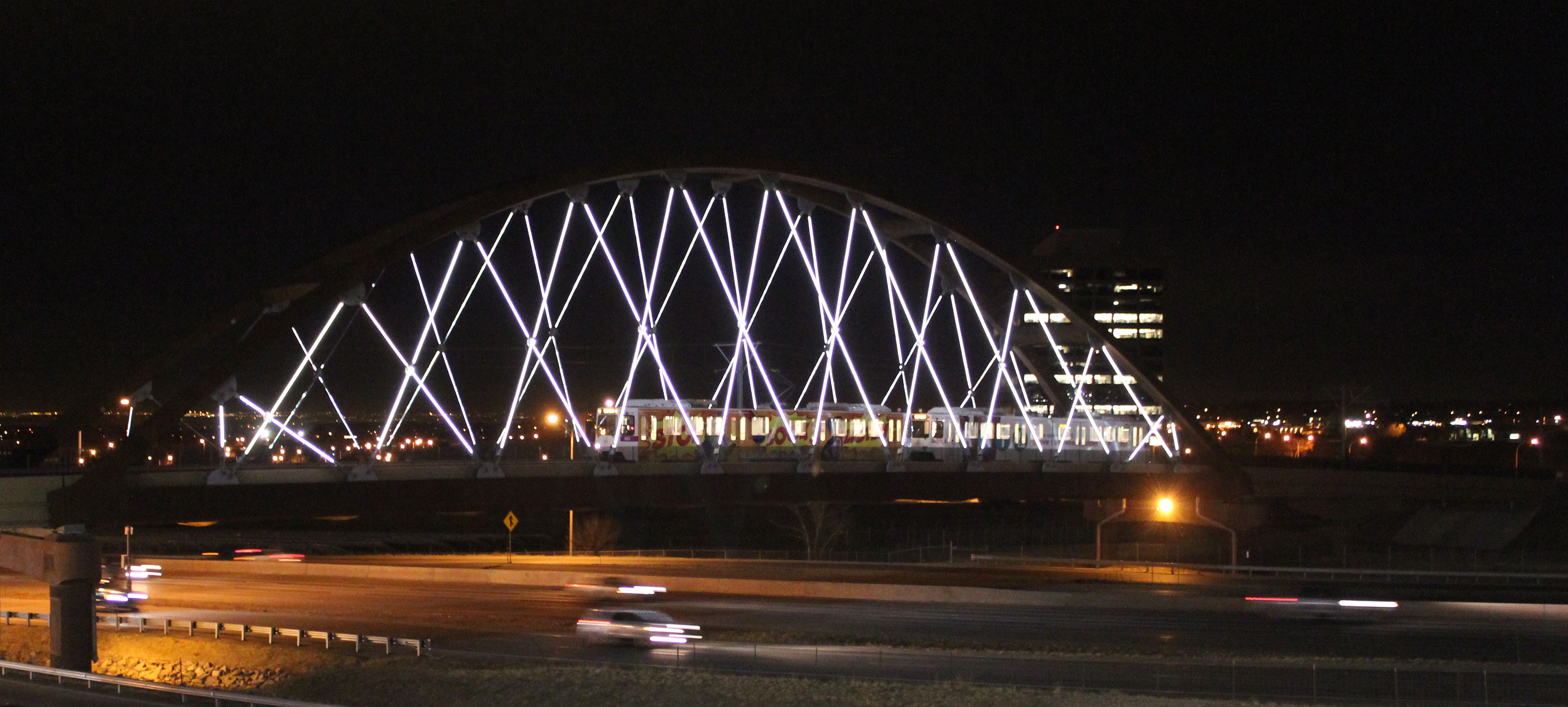
- W Line bridge over 6th Avenue near the Federal Center

Overview
- Other name: West Line
- Owner: Regional Transportation District
- Locale: Denver Metropolitan Area
- Termini: Jefferson County Government Center–Golden Federal Center (weekend alternating); Union Station
- Stations: 15
- Website: Official website

Service
- Type: Light rail
- System: RTD Rail
- Operator: Regional Transportation District
- Daily ridership: 8,696 (2023)
- Ridership: 3,174,000 (FY2023, annual)

History
- Opened: April 26, 2013; 13 years ago

Technical
- Line length: 12.1 mi (19.47 km)
- Number of tracks: 1–2
- Track gauge: 4 ft 8 1/2 in (1,435 mm) standard gauge
- Electrification: Overhead line, 750 V DC
Route map
W Line highlighted in blue

The W Line is a Regional Transportation District (RTD) light rail line that serves stations in Denver, Lakewood, and Golden, Colorado. The line began service on April 26, 2013, with the completion of the West Line of the FasTracks project. The W Line was the first part of FasTracks to break ground and begin operations. It is colored teal on system maps.

== History ==
The Denver, Lakewood and Golden Railroad started operations in the area in 1893, switching to electric traction by 1909 as the Denver and Intermountain Railroad. The route ran from the downtown Denver interurban loop, along Lakewood Gulch and 13th Avenue, continuing out to Golden. Interurban service continued until 1950, when all Denver area trolley and interurban service ceased.

Plans to resurrect a railway line from Denver to Golden were advanced in the mid-1970s and in the 1980s RTD purchased the right-of-way to an unused rail corridor between the two cities. A study conducted in 1997 stated the need for a rapid transit corridor through the region, and settled on 13th Avenue as the locally preferred alternative. An environmental impact statement was started in 2001 and finished with a record of decision in 2004. A "rail-pulling" ceremony was held on the 13th Avenue corridor on May 16, 2007, and construction started in earnest in early 2008.

As project costs climbed above the initial estimates, cuts were made, including reducing the line from a double track to a single-track operation from west of the Federal Center Station to the end of the line at the Jefferson County Government Center. The first full test run of the line happened on January 3, 2013, in anticipation of the official opening, April 26, 2013, eight months ahead of schedule.

== Route ==
The western terminus of the W Line is at Jeffco Government Center–Golden station in Golden. The line travels east alongside the US 6 freeway before dipping south at Federal Center station. East of Federal Center, the line expands from single-track to double-track. From there, the line then curves back north along the Remington spur before returning east, following 13th Avenue to the Lakewood Industrial Park at Oak station. At Lamar station, the line meets Lakewood Gulch. It follows Lakewood Gulch east to Decatur-Federal station, where it crosses over the South Platte River, under Interstate 25, then over the Colorado Joint Line, where it meets the C and E Lines just south of Auraria West station. The three lines travel north to Union Station, where they terminate at the light rail plaza.

The single-track section between Jeffco Government Center-Golden and Federal Center limits headways to no better than every 15 minutes over that section of the line. On weekends, every other westbound W Line train terminates at Federal Center, further limiting headways over this stretch to every 30 minutes. The W Line is also the only RTD light rail line to not enter the downtown loop or connect to a line that does. Passengers wishing to access the downtown loop must either do so via the 16th Street FreeRide at Union Station, or make a free out-of-system transfer between Auraria West and Colfax at Auraria via the Auraria Campus.

The W Line is the first light rail route in metro Denver to make extensive use of gated grade crossings within its right-of-way (there were only four such grade crossings on the previously existing network). Some of the route goes through residential areas and concerns about noise led to an innovative solution for the warning system at crossing gates. The warning bells will adjust their volume in response to the ambient noise resulting in 50-70 dB during the evening hours compared to the standard volume of 90-100 dB.

== Stations ==
Station	Municipality	Opened	Major connections & notes
Jefferson County Government Center–Golden	Golden	April 26, 2013	Park and ride: 705 spaces
Red Rocks College	Lakewood	April 26, 2013	
Federal Center	Lakewood	April 26, 2013	Park and ride: 1,000 spaces
Oak	Lakewood	April 26, 2013	Park and ride: 200 spaces
Garrison	Lakewood	April 26, 2013	
Lakewood–Wadsworth	Lakewood	April 26, 2013	Park and ride: 1,000 spaces
Lamar	Lakewood	April 26, 2013	
Sheridan	Denver/Lakewood	April 26, 2013	Park and ride: 800 spaces
Perry	Denver	April 26, 2013	
Knox	Denver	April 26, 2013	
Decatur–Federal	Denver	April 26, 2013	Park and ride: 1,900 spaces
Auraria West	Denver	April 5, 2002	Regional Transportation District C Line (RTD) E Line (RTD)
Empower Field at Mile High	Denver	April 5, 2002	Regional Transportation District C Line (RTD) E Line (RTD)
Ball Arena–Elitch Gardens	Denver	April 5, 2002	Regional Transportation District C Line (RTD) E Line (RTD)
Union Station	Denver	April 5, 2002	California Zephyr; 16th Street FreeRide
