= Villa Park, Denver =

Neighborhood of Denver, Colorado, United States

Coordinates: 39.7306°N 105.0395°W

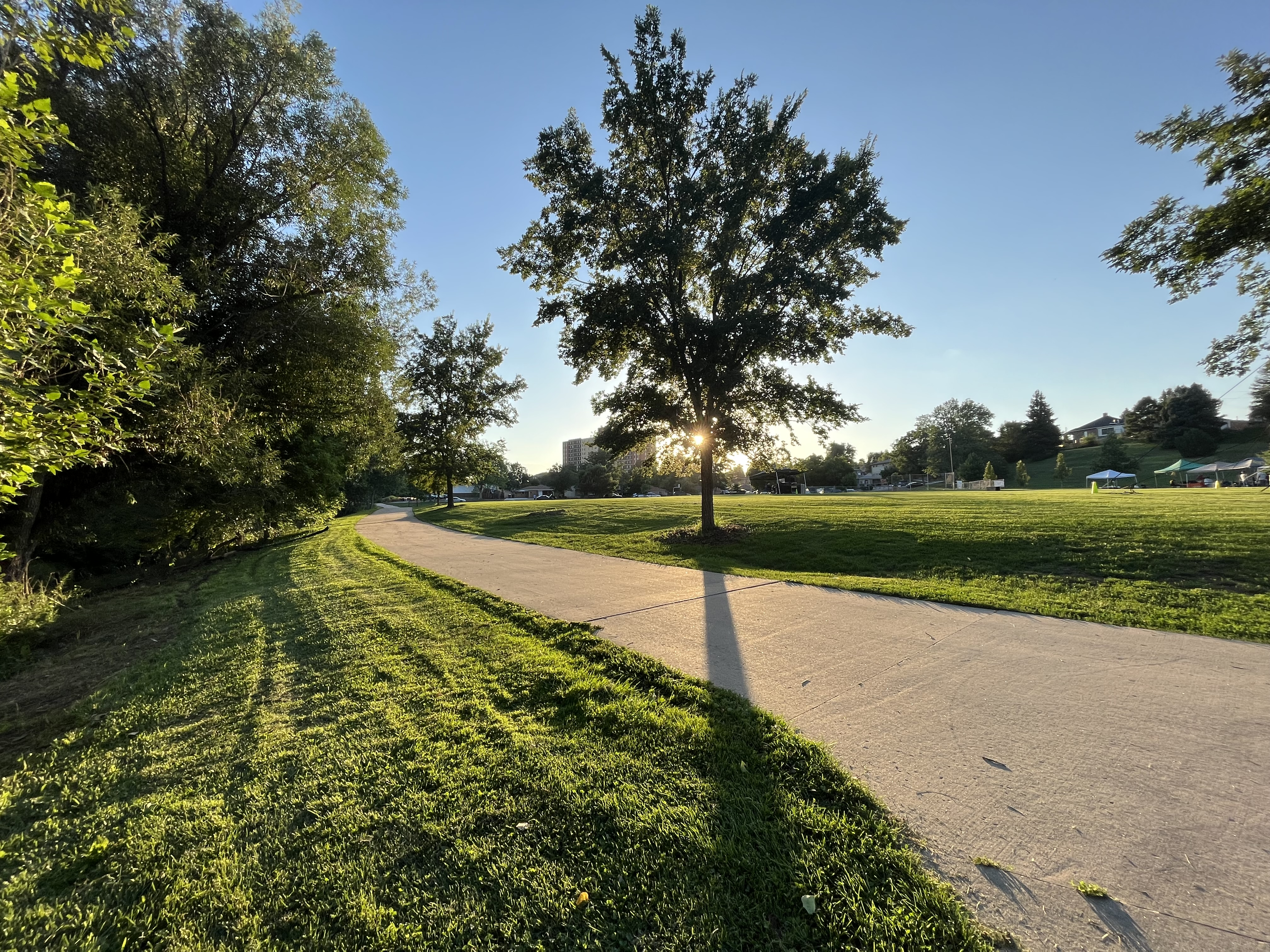
Summer in Joseph P. Martinez Park, located in the Villa Park neighborhood of Denver, Colorado.

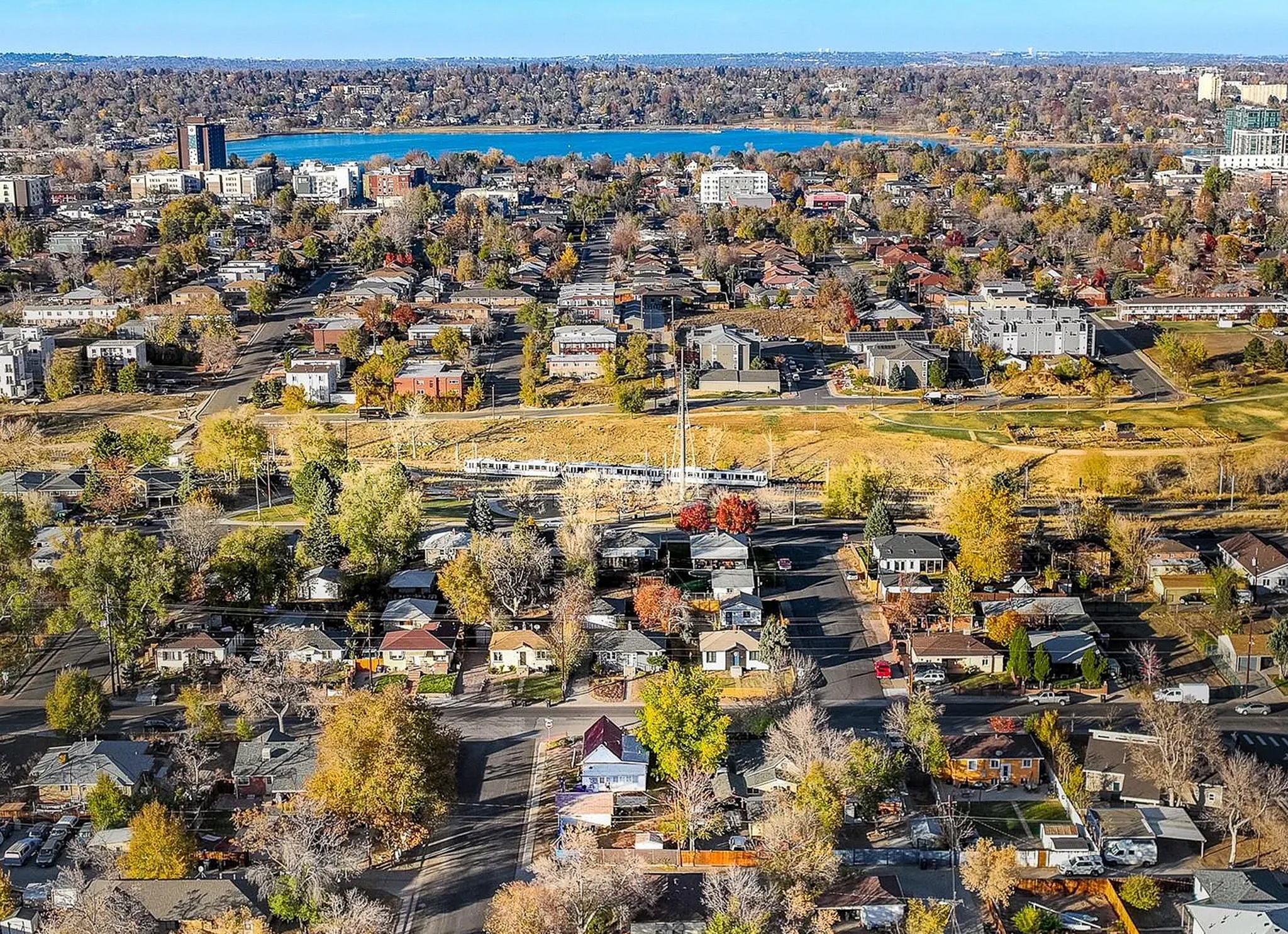
Villa Park overlooking the West Colfax and Sloan's Lake neighborhoods.

Villa Park is a neighborhood in the city of Denver, Colorado. Its hilly topography provides panoramic views of downtown Denver and of the Rocky Mountains, particularly from Lakewood / Dry Gulch Park, which divides the neighborhood diagonally.

== Geography ==
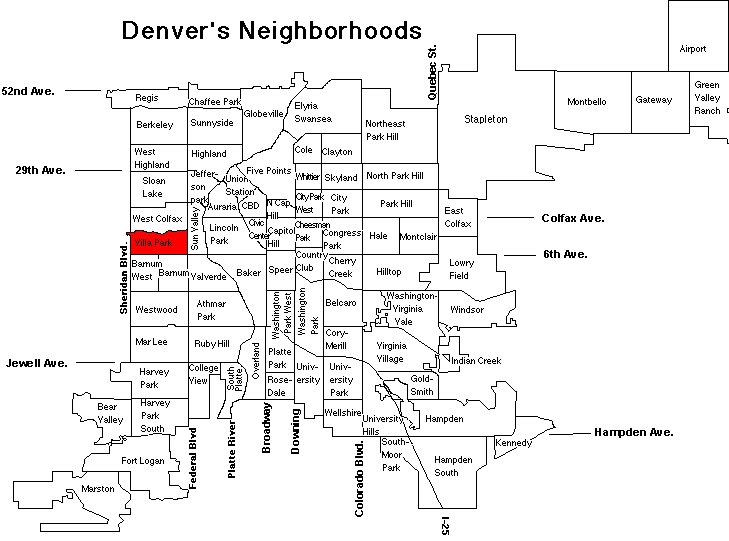
A map of Denver highlighting the location of the Villa Park neighborhood.

The neighborhood is located in the area traditionally known as West Denver, about two to three miles (5 km) west of Downtown Denver. The neighborhood is bounded on the north by Lakewood Gulch, on the east by Federal Boulevard, on the south by the 6th Avenue Freeway, and on the west by Sheridan Boulevard, except for a small notch occupying a few square blocks that protrudes to the westward of Sheridan Boulevard between 10th Avenue and Lakewood Gulch. Generally, Sheridan Boulevard is the border between Jefferson County and the City and County of Denver. Feeder streets include 10th Avenue, Perry Street and Knox Court, the few streets with bridges across the major geographic barriers within the neighborhood.

The neighborhood contains three small creeks: Lakewood Gulch, which provides the northern border for the neighborhood, Dry Gulch and Weir Gulch. The confluence of Lakewood and Dry gulches is located in the neighborhood near the intersection of 10th Avenue and Osceola Street. Martinez, Paco Sanchez, Lakewood/Dry Gulch, and Barnum North parks straddle the creeks as they meander through the neighborhood. Much of the areas around the creeks have a typical riparian environment and are more natural than many other areas of the city as a result. Several bike and pedestrian paths also follow the creeks and connect the neighborhood with the rest of the city. Because of the creeks and a general elevation gain towards the west, Villa Park is a very hilly neighborhood.

== Character ==
According to the Piton Foundation, the 2017 population of the neighborhood was 9,400. The neighborhood is about 70 percent Latino, 26 percent white and the rest from other ethnicities. The neighborhood also has a large immigrant community with more than 27 percent of residents born in another country. The most common age group is 25-34, making up about 20 percent of the neighborhood's population. The neighborhood's population is mostly middle class with an average income of about $49,000. Around 25 percent of Villa Park's population is below the poverty line. Crime rates are close to Denver averages except for somewhat higher rates of burglary.

The neighborhood consists chiefly of single-family homes, with some townhomes, apartment buildings and several apartment complexes. Villa Park offers residents an urban-suburban mix feel. Commercial development exists primarily on the major thoroughfares of Sheridan and Federal Boulevards with smaller commercial areas along Sixth and 10th Avenues and Knox Court. In early 2013, the west corridor of the FasTracks was completed, running through Lakewood Gulch. The RTD W Line provides light rail service to the neighborhood with stops at Knox Court, Perry Street and Sheridan Boulevard. It is the first completed project of the FasTracks system.

On March 28, 2023, the Denver City Council approved the West Area Plan, which includes Villa Park.

The neighborhood has a community group named Villa Park Neighborhood Association (VPNA).

== History ==
In 1871, developers bought more than 1,000 acres (4.0 km^{2}) of land in the area that now includes Villa Park and the Barnum neighborhoods. Original plans called for a subdivision with artificial lakes, ravines and beautiful landscape design by Frederick Law Olmsted, the man who designed Central Park. The plan never came to fruition and the land was sold to a group led by Judge Hiram Bond who operated a cattle brokerage there until 1878. At that time it was sold by Bond to Helen Barnum Hurd Buchtel, the daughter of circus owner Phineas Barnum, whose family was active in Denver real estate. Because of unfavorable geography, the Villa Park was slow to develop with only about 66 buildings in the area by the 1900 census. Single-unit construction continued slowly into the 1950s when most of the neighborhood had been fully developed. In the 1960s and 1970s, more multi-unit building construction occurred in Villa Park, primarily in the western side of the neighborhood.

== See also ==
- Bibliography of Colorado
- Geography of Colorado
- History of Colorado
- Index of Colorado-related articles
- List of Colorado-related lists
  - List of neighborhoods in Denver
  - List of populated places in Colorado
- Outline of Colorado
