= Lakewood Gulch =

River valley in Denver, Colorado, USA

Coordinates: 39.7378°N 105.0222°W

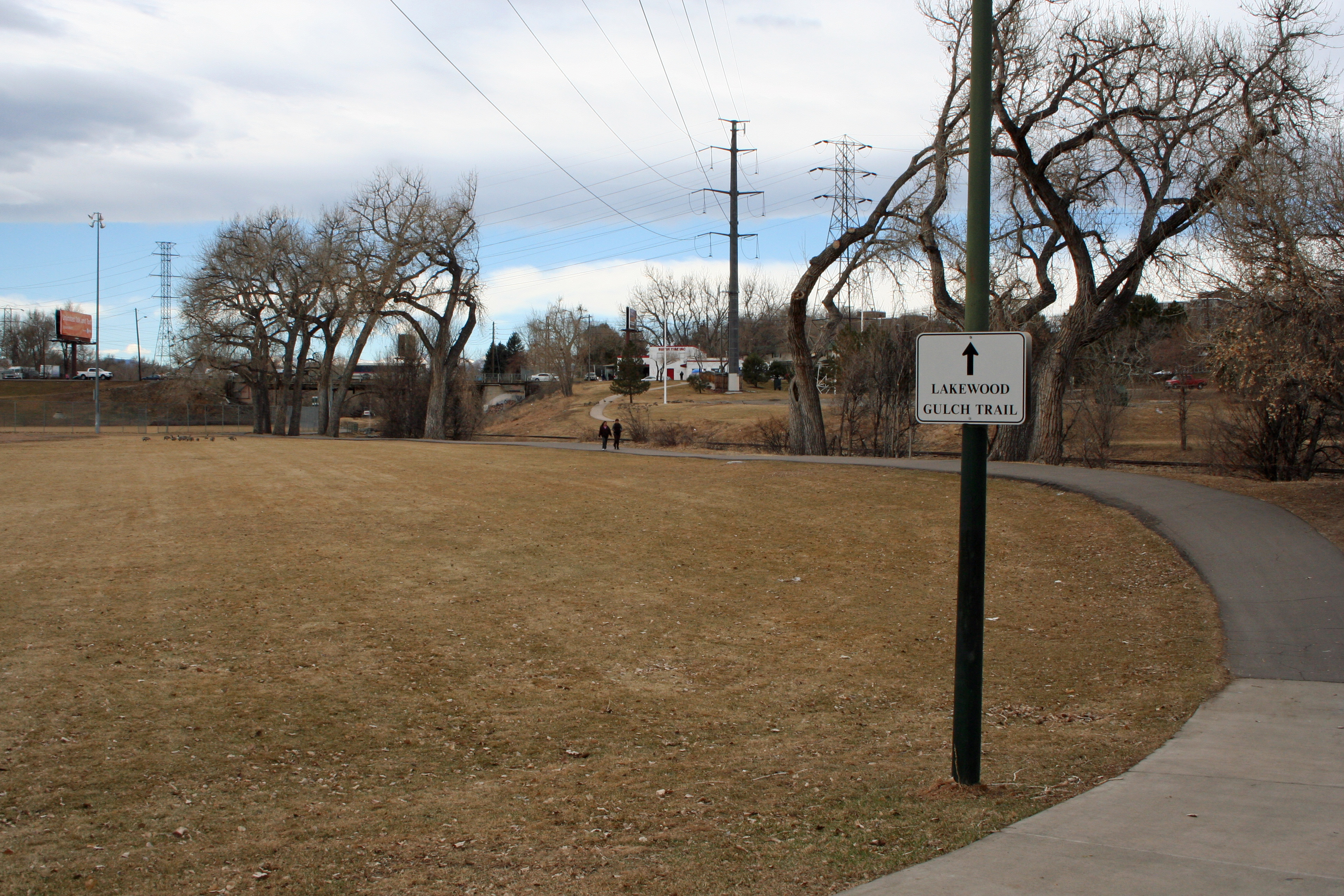
A view of Lakewood Gulch in Denver looking west. The bridge in the background is Federal Boulevard as it goes over the gulch.

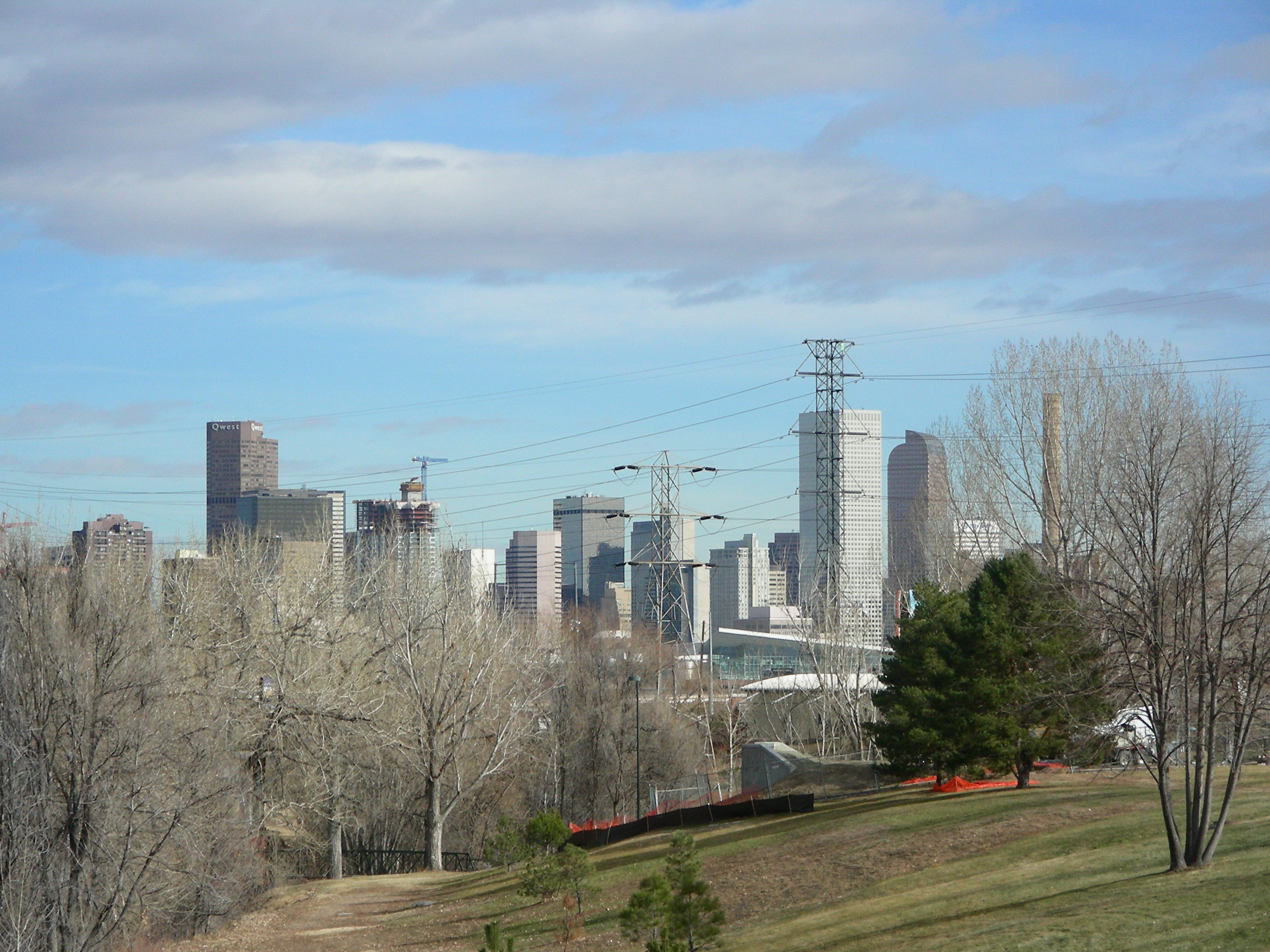
Lakewood Gulch. in the area of Knox Ct. Looking East

Lakewood Gulch drains a section of Lakewood and west Denver, Colorado into the South Platte River. It is the historic location of the old Interurban Shortline Railway and, in 2008, is a greenbelt that includes Rude Park, Sanchez Park and Lakewood Gulch Park. The gulch passes through Lakewood from west to east before entering the Denver neighborhoods of Sun Valley and Villa Park. It formerly contained a part of the route of the heritage streetcar Platte Valley Trolley. The Denver sections of the creek have an adjacent bike path. According to the Jefferson County Colorado Place Names Directory, "Lakewood Gulch originates on the north east foot of Green Mountain in Lakewood, flows east through Sixth Avenue West Park and Red Rocks Community College and continues east through Lakewood into Denver, where it joins the South Platte River southwest of the intersection of I-25 and Colfax Avenue."

On May 16, 2007, a mother and her toddler got trapped in a flash flood of Lakewood Gulch when they attempted to escape hail in a small tunnel adjoining the creek as it travels under Decatur Street in Denver. The mother lost the grip of her toddler's stroller and the child was swept downstream where he was found dead a few miles away on the banks of the South Platte River. The last half-mile of the creek, where the incident took place, is inside of a concrete lined channel known to occasionally flood. After the incident, the bike path adjoining the creek in this area has been permanently closed.

The FasTracks West Corridor of the Denver RTD was built on the land adjoining and within Lakewood Gulch. The "W" light rail line opened for passenger service on April 25, 2013.

== See also ==
- List of rivers of Colorado
