= FasTracks =

Transit expansion project in Denver, CO

FasTracks is a proposed multibillion-dollar public transportation expansion plan under construction in metropolitan Denver, Colorado, United States. Developed by the Regional Transportation District (RTD), the plan consisted of new commuter rail, light rail, and express bus services. Six new light rail, electric commuter rail and diesel commuter rail lines with a combined length of 122 miles (196 km) was to be constructed under the plan. It would have expanded on previous transportation projects, notably T-REX, and includes 57 new transit stations and stops, 21,000 new parking spaces, 18 miles (29 km) of a bus service between Denver and Boulder and the renovation of Denver Union Station as a multi-modal transportation hub.

In February 2026, RTD board chair Patrick O'Keefe said that the plan will never be finished due to lack of funding and outdated design plans. In an interview with Colorado Public Radio, O'Keefe stated that alternative plans for highspeed rail in the Denver Metro should be considered.

Originally envisioned to cost $4.7 billion and to be completed in 2017, voters in the eight counties that comprise the RTD approved a 0.4 percent sales tax increase in 2004. By 2010, the budget grew to $6.5 billion while projected revenues dropped to $4.1 billion. The project was not expected to be finished until after 2050. Alternative funding sources, such as public-private partnerships, have been sought.

The first of the six new lines envisioned in the plan, the West Corridor light rail line to Golden, Colorado, opened for revenue service on April 26, 2013. By mid-2014, construction was underway on the five other rail lines. Two commuter rail lines opened on their long-anticipated dates in 2016: the East Rail Line to Denver International Airport and the portion of the Northwest Rail Line to south Westminster. The I-225 Rail Line through Aurora opened on February 24, 2017, and the Gold Line to Wheat Ridge opened on April 26, 2019. In addition, the North Metro Rail Line to Thornton opened in 2020.

Denver Union Station underwent $200 million worth of facility improvements to turn it into the hub for new commuter and light rail lines as well as bus service in downtown Denver. The underground 22-bay bus concourse at Union Station opened on May 11, 2014, while the restaurants, bars, and hotel officially opened July 26, 2014.

== Progress ==
FasTracks is being funded with federal appropriations, private contributions, and a region-wide sales tax increase. The project was allowed to begin when the sales tax portion of its funding was approved by Denver metro area voters in November 2004. The tax went into effect in January 2005.

In 2006, engineering design of the initial segment, the West Rail Line, was begun.

By spring of 2006, the environmental impact statements of all other proposed lines were underway. The municipal governments of Denver, Boulder, and Lakewood had launched detailed studies of community redevelopment possibilities around station locations. The cities of Westminster, Thornton, Aurora, Greenwood Village, Englewood, Sheridan, and Arvada are also planning transit oriented development areas around some of their proposed rail stations.

Central to the regional nature of the service package is Union Station. Special studies of its redevelopment and adaptation for multiple transport modes were conducted and engineering design work and property development work was underway in 2006.

In May 2007, a $1.5 billion budget overrun was reported. Despite service and construction reductions, by January 2010 the budget had grown to $6.5 billion (a $1.8 billion overrun). At the same time, sales tax revenue forecasts for 2017 were projected to come in much less than originally anticipated leaving the project $2.45 billion short.

On April 13, 2010, the RTD board of directors decided to postpone asking voters to further increase the current sales tax. If the tax increase fails to be implemented, the full build-out of the FasTracks plan may not take place until 2042.

On August 31, 2011, US Transportation Secretary Ray LaHood announced that the US Department of Transportation had approved a $1 billion grant to the Eagle P3 project, which consists of the East and Gold commuter rail lines, covering half of the $2 billion cost of the construction of the two lines.

In March 2012, RTD received an unsolicited proposal to build the I-225 Corridor line from Kiewit Infrastructure Co. After determining the proposal had merit and seeking other bids, RTD selected Kiewit to build the line. In 2013, RTD received a second unsolicited proposal this time to build the North Metro Line. RTD sought bids to build the line out in multiple phases. After receiving four bids, RTD selected the partnership of Graham Contracting Ltd., Balfour Beatty Rail Inc. and Harmon Contractors Inc. (GBBH), the same group that had submitted the unsolicited proposal.

On April 26, 2013, the first completed segment of the FasTracks regional transit-expansion plan was opened to the public, the W Line.

In November 2014, the first commuter rail cars arrived in Denver from the Hyundai–Rotem USA plant in Philadelphia, PA.

In February 2026, RTD board chair Patrick O'Keefe stated that the project would likely never be finished and alternative Denver Metro rail options should be considered.

== Project details ==
=== Eagle public-private partnership ===
The Eagle public–private partnership (P3) combines two commuter rail lines, the East Line to DIA and the Gold Line to Wheat Ridge, plus a section of the Northwest Line up to Westminster, and a maintenance facility into a single contract. Denver Transit Partners, the consortium of companies RTD selected to lead the Eagle P3 project, is responsible for the design, construction, financing, operation and maintenance of the rail lines in the contract.

Construction broke ground on the Gold Line on August 26, 2010. In August 2011, Secretary of Transportation Ray LaHood committed $1 billion in federal money to the Eagle P3 project. In December LaHood approved a $280 million loan to advance construction. As of June 2013, the project is on track to open the rail lines under contract in 2016.

==== East Rail Line (commuter rail) ====
Being constructed as part of the Eagle P3, the East Rail Line is a 23.6-mile (38.0 km) commuter rail line between downtown Denver, Aurora, and Denver International Airport using electric multiple unit (EMU) commuter trains. To expedite travel time between downtown Denver and Denver International Airport, only six stations will be located on the line. Construction started in August 2010, and the line opened to the public on April 22, 2016.

==== Gold Line (commuter rail) ====
The second full line funded under the Eagle P3, the Gold Line is an 11.2-mile (18.0 km) commuter rail corridor that will run from Denver Union Station to Wheat Ridge, passing through Adams County and Arvada. As with the East Corridor, the RTD Board of Directors chose EMU commuter trains to run on the Gold Line. Seven new stations—with an already existing station at Union— were built for the line. It opened on April 26, 2019.

=== I-225 Corridor (light rail) ===
The I-225 Corridor is 10.5-mile (16.9 km) light rail line running through Aurora and facilitate a circumferential link between the Southeast Corridor and the East Line. The project will include seven new stations and provide 1,800 new parking spaces. Construction began in the spring of 2012 on a short section of the line as part of a joint contract with CDOT. Following an unsolicited proposal from Kiewit Infrastructure Co. funding was secured for the full line which opened on February 24, 2017.

=== North Metro Corridor (commuter rail) ===
The North Metro Corridor is a commuter rail line that runs along an existing railroad right-of-way from Denver to 160th Avenue in Thornton. The line has eight stations on its 18.4-mile (29.6 km) route. In 2009, RTD paid $117 million to purchase the right-of-way from Union Pacific in preparation for the buildout of the North Metro line. However, with the global recession of 2009, the North Metro Corridor became a victim of financial setbacks and it was feared that the line would not be built until 2044. RTD was able to avoid delaying the construction of the line when it accepted an unsolicited offer in 2013 to build out the full line in two stages. The first phase was completed in 2020.

=== Northwest Rail Corridor (commuter rail) ===
The Northwest Rail Corridor is a commuter rail project between Denver, Boulder, and Longmont. The completion of the proposed 41-mile (66 km) line, would consist of seven stations. The route would follow an existing railroad right-of-way from BNSF. The only segment of the line that has been completed to date has been up to Westminster Station. The station sits just south west of Federal and 72nd in Westminster. The line runs from Denver's Union Station to south Westminster, with plans for future segments in the distant future. The project was and still is a construction project part of the Eagle P3 project. Future segments are in an unknown phase at the moment and no construction has started on any other segments on the line. The remaining segments are currently predicted for completion by the year 2044. The announcement angered many voters in the cities and suburbs north of Denver who had approved a sales tax increase in 2004 to fund the FasTracks project.

The downturn in the economy and significant cost increases and delays associated with building and operating the Northwest Corridor led to the initiation of the year-long "Northwest Area Mobility Study". This was an effort between northwest area governments and transportation partners that set out to recommend alternatives to the voter approved commuter rail line that could have possibly brought near-term mobility improvements to the northwest area. The study concluded in 2014 and made a number of recommendations that were adopted by the RTD Board of Directors in June 2014. One of the recommendations adopted was an interim express bus service called "Flatiron Flyer". In summer 2018, the U.S. 36 Mayors and Commissioners Coalition was gathering support from other members to ask RTD to provide an estimate for at least weekday rush hour commuter rail service along the original corridor to Longmont. The "Peak Service Plan" would carry 1,400 passengers per weekday.

=== West Corridor (light rail) ===
Preliminary work on the West Corridor light rail line began on May 16, 2007. During early stages of development, it was decided that the line from the Federal Center to the Jefferson County Government Center would be reduced to a single track to help cut costs. According to RTD, this change would reduce train headways from 15 minutes to 5 and make it easier for the line to run along the side of U.S. 6. Upon the completion of construction the line was designated the "W Line". The 12.1 mile light rail line was opened to the public on April 26, 2013, and is the first completed segment of the FasTracks regional transit-expansion plan.

=== US 36 Corridor ===
This is an 18-mile (29 km) long express bus line, branded "Flatiron Flyer", running along US 36 between Denver and Boulder, Colorado with six stops planned along the route. A joint project between CDOT and RTD, the road was widened by 40 feet in each direction to allow the addition of a high-occupancy vehicle lane instead of the trains voters approved. The project was completed in two phases, with the first phase completed in May 2010. The second phase began construction in July 2012 and opened to the public in 2016. Sections of the road subsequently collapsed in summer 2019.

=== Extensions (light rail) ===
There are plans for extensions to a few existing light rail lines; they include a 2.5-mile (4.0 km) extension to the Southwest Corridor, extending the line to the southwest corner of Lucent Boulevard and C-470. A 2.3-mile (3.7 km) extension to the Southeast Corridor into Lone Tree which opened to the public in May 2019; and a 0.8-mile (1.3 km) extension to the Central Corridor to connect the 30th & Downing station with the East Corridor commuter rail line at the intersection of 38th and Blake.

== Economic growth/development ==
According to RTD (2012), when new development occurs near stations, it increases the likelihood that residents and workers will choose transit as their transportation mode. This reduces the growth in vehicle miles traveled (VMT) and auto trips on a constrained roadway system while, at the same time, accommodating new growth.

RTD has conducted a Quality of Life (QoL) study for the neighborhoods' impacted by FasTracks with baseline data collection starting in 2006 and continuing bi-annually to the present. The QoL study tracks a number of economic and community development indicators.

== Rolling stock ==
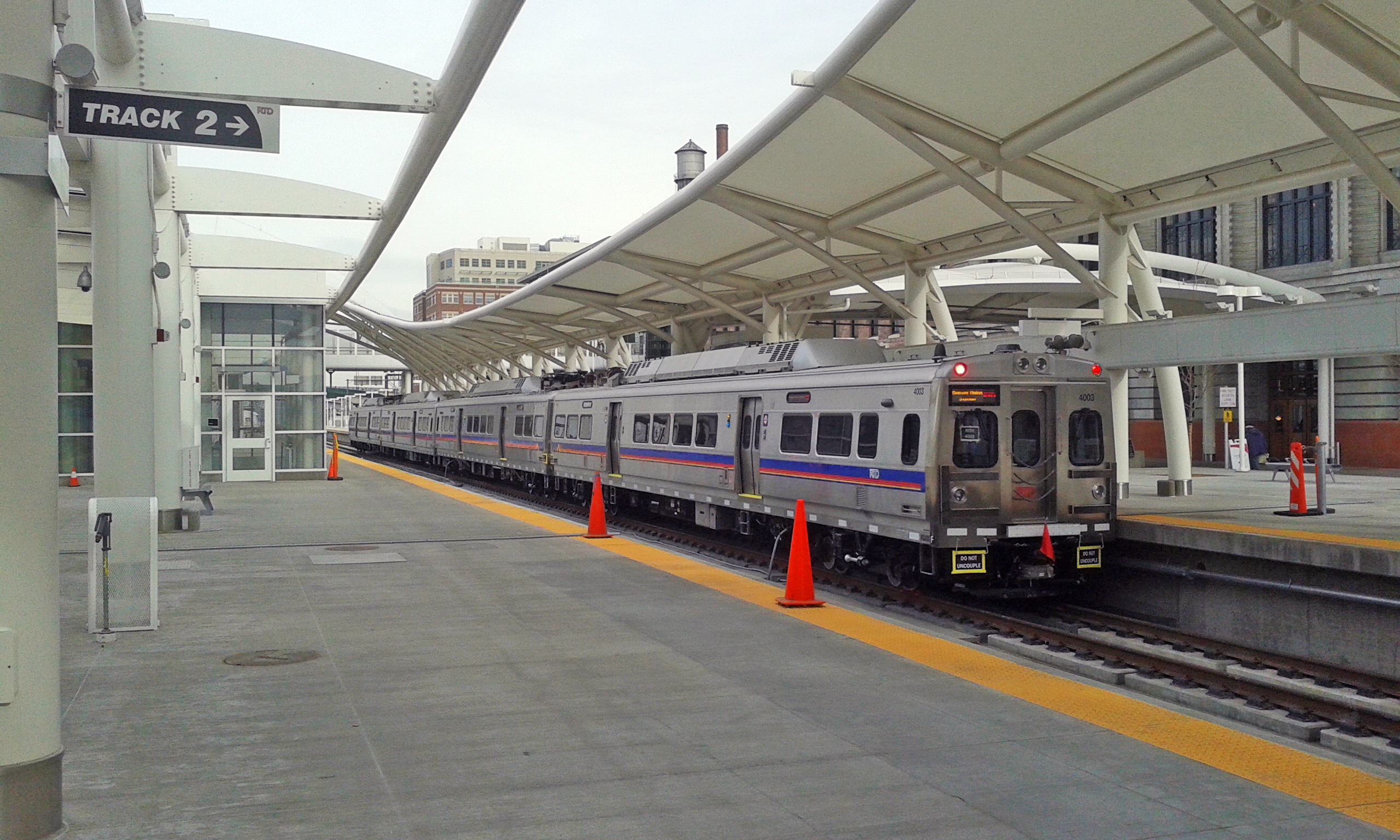
RTD Silverliner at Denver Union Station.

As of 2015, FasTracks has on order 66 Hyundai Rotem Silverliner V electric multiple unit rail cars operated in a married pair configuration. These cars were initially developed by Rotem for Philadelphia's SEPTA Regional Rail in 2009, with RTD's order coming a year later in 2010. RTD's numbered 4001 through 4066, possess a number of differences from the ones operated by SEPTA, most notably the lack of low platform steps and full-width cabs.

All trains operating on the commuter rail lines will be equipped with positive train control.

== Criticism ==
=== Denver Union Station Design ===
The Regional Transportation District (RTD) and Denver Union Station Project Authority (DUSPA) has received significant criticism for the redevelopment of the Denver Union Station. Many public transportation advocates and planning experts maintain that the project precludes impending access of high-speed rail technology and north–south passenger rail routes such as Front Range Rail, is designed to present logistical complications for both rail and bus commuters, lacks integration of bicycle facilities and an intercity bus station, and is being modeled to perform as a stub-end terminal for current and future intercity rail routes. Many citizens and public transportation advocates have also expressed frustration with the high cost associated with the project's design and its direct impact on the agency's ability to complete all rail lines that were a part of the original voter-approved FasTracks project proposal. In 2009, the Colorado Rail Passenger Association, a local rail transportation advocacy group, filed a lawsuit against the Federal Transportation Administration for its acceptance of DUSPA's Environmental Impact Statement, which suspiciously omitted several impactful statements and comments that were contributed by the members of the community.

=== Eminent domain ===
The Regional Transportation District have used eminent domain to condemn properties in the path of transportation projects. Several property owners have protested the taking of their properties for FasTracks lines.

=== Federal Station relocation ===
The Regional Transportation District proposed relocating the Gold Line Federal Station from the previously approved east side site to the west side of Federal Boulevard. Some residents opposed the move on the grounds that was only to benefit a developer who owned property near the west side site, and revitalization of the community would be better served by the east side location. RTD supported the move because the east side location was a former waste dump, and that the west side location would be more accessible for the community.

On December 15, 2010, RTD announced that the Federal Station would remain on the east side of Federal and not be moved to the west side. The Adams County Commissioners, who had originally requested the change, withdrew their support under pressure from residents of a subdivision near the west site, who opposed the private developer's plan to build higher-density housing and commercial buildings around the new station site.

=== Indefinite Northwest Rail Line delay ===
Originally, the voter-approved plan called for a 41-mile (66 km) high-capacity commuter rail line running from Denver Union Station to Longmont, passing through North Denver, Adams County, Westminster, Broomfield, Louisville and Boulder. Back in early 2008, the diesel-powered heavy rail service was expected to start running in late 2014 or early 2015 - roughly ten years after the FasTracks vote - initially with 58 trains a day, ramping up over a decade to 84 trains by 2025. The completion of this original plan has been delayed until 2044 due to lower tax revenues and higher costs than expected.

In January 2016, RTD introduced a new express bus system in the US 36 Corridor, parallel to the Northwest Rail corridor. Branded "Flatiron Flyer", it travels in high-occupancy toll lanes along US 36 between Denver and Boulder. The consolidation of current express service between Denver and Boulder into this one system attracted criticism from Boulder residents, since increased frequencies were balanced with some service cuts - particularly to service patterns making the least number of stops between Boulder and Denver. Additionally, the ITDP classified the system as "not bus rapid transit", due to the use of lanes shared with private cars along US 36, the lack of street level boarding/alighting and the lack of an off-board fare system. A plan to allow Flatiron Flyer US 36 buses on shoulders during high-traffic periods required the 2016 state legislature to pass such authorization (passed on January 13, signed by the governor on March 9), effective May 1.

== See also ==
- Regional Transportation District
