= E1000 =

E1000 may refer to:

- Cholic acid
- Epic E1000, an American turboprop aircraft design
- E1000 series, a train used by the Taiwan Railways Administration
