= EMU3000 series =

Passenger train in Taiwan

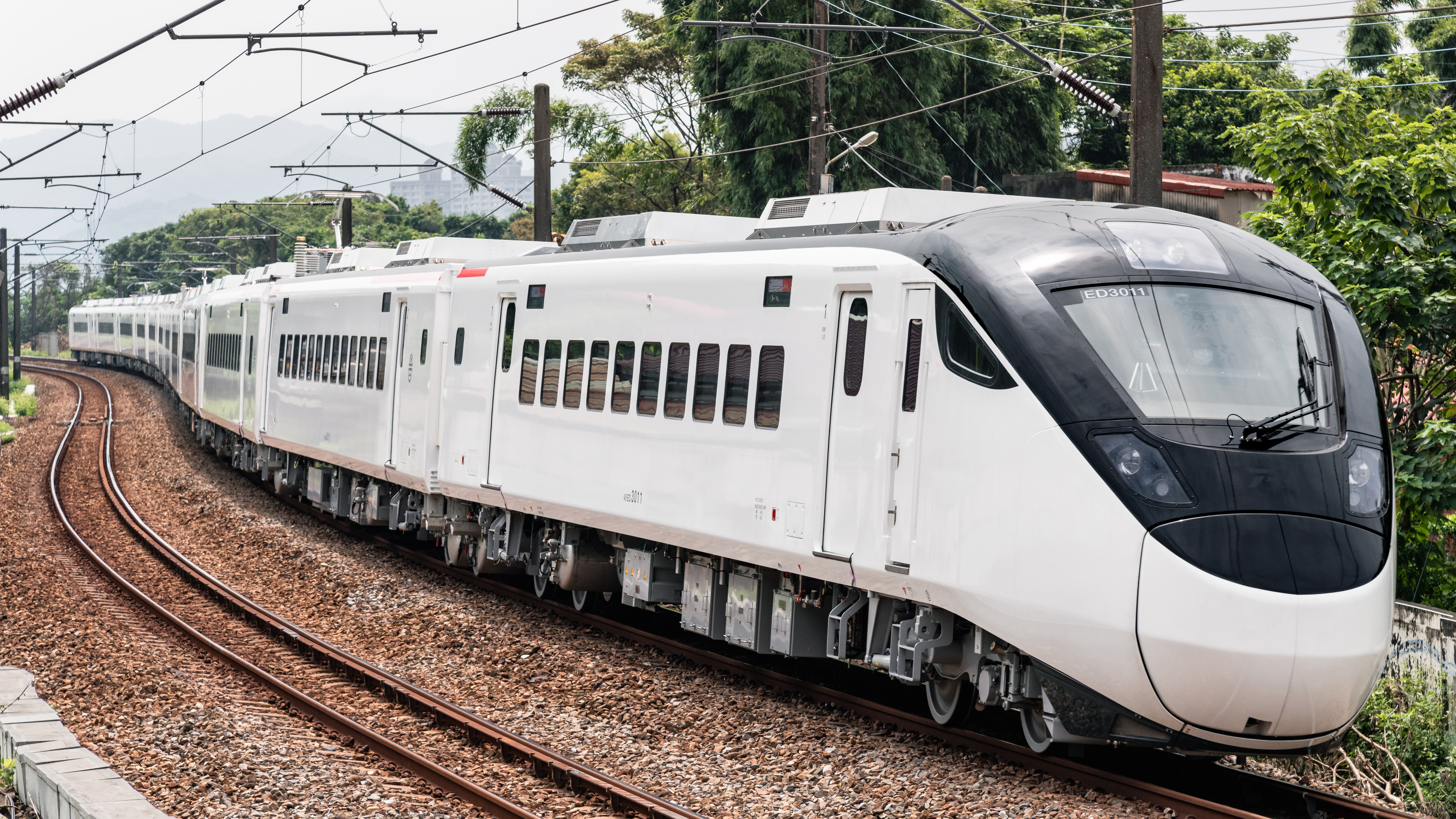
- Set 01 testing near Yingge

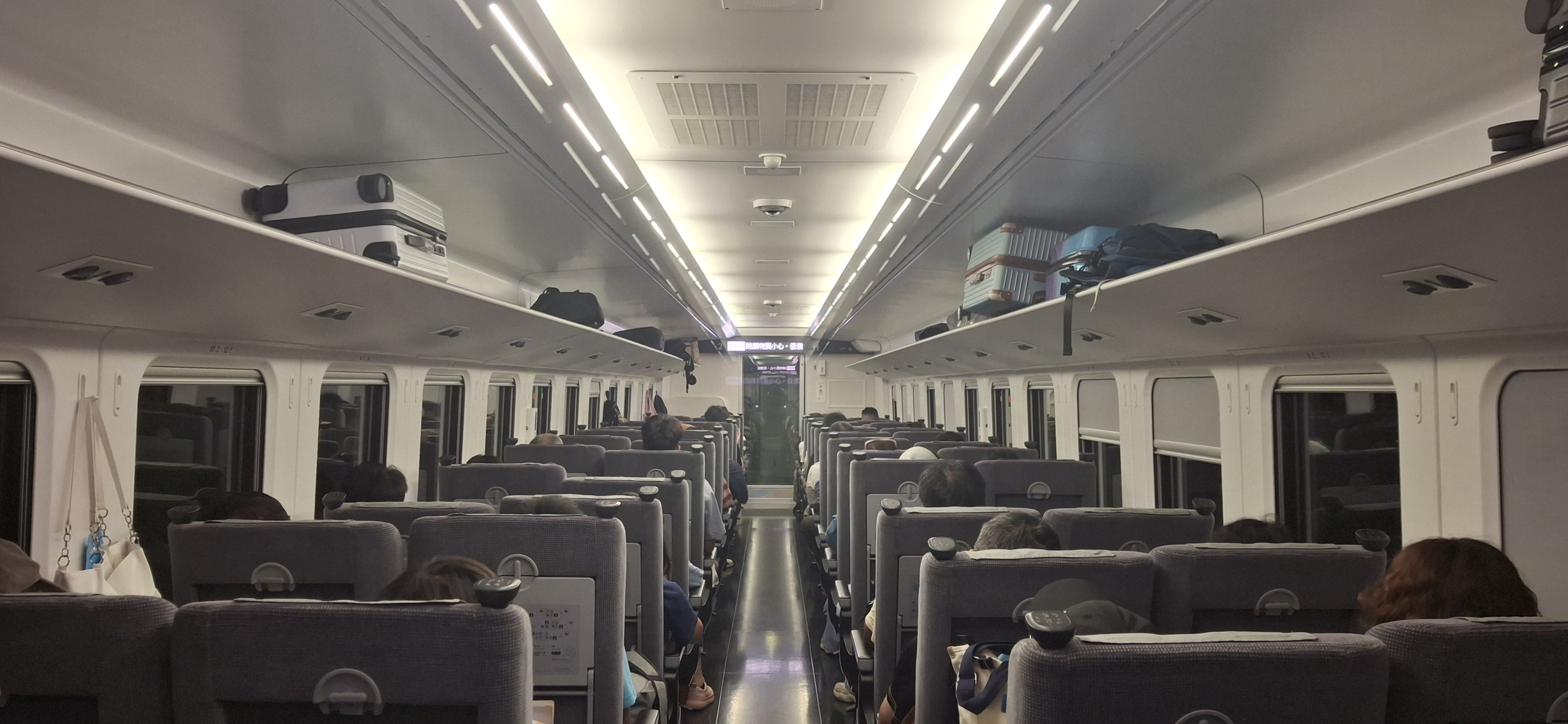
- Train Interior
- Manufacturer: Hitachi Rail
- Built at: Kasado, Kudamatsu, Yamaguchi, Japan
- Family name: AT300 (rolling stock); Tze-chiang limited express (service)
- Constructed: 2021–2024
- Entered service: 8 December 2021 (testing); 29 December 2021 (official)
- Number built: 600 vehicles (50 sets)
- Number in service: 600 vehicles (50 sets)
- Formation: 12 cars per trainset
- Fleet numbers: EMU301x–EMU350x
- Capacity: 538 seated per train
- Operator: Taiwan Railway Corporation

Specifications
- Car body construction: Aluminium alloy, double-skin
- Train length: 245.7 m (806 ft 1 1/4 in)
- Car length: 21.35 m (70 ft 9/16 in) (ED); 20.3 m (66 ft 7 3/16 in) (EM/EP/ET)
- Width: 2.91 m (9 ft 6 9/16 in)
- Height: 3.75 m (12 ft 3 5/8 in) (ED); 3.49 m (11 ft 5 3/8 in) (EM)
- Maximum speed: Service: 130 km/h (81 mph); Design: 150 km/h (93 mph)
- Weight: 545 t (536 long tons; 601 short tons)
- Traction system: Hitachi CII-HR1420F hybrid SiC-IGBT–C/I
- Traction motors: 24 × Hitachi HS32532-10RB 190 kW (255 hp) asynchronous 3-phase AC
- Power output: 4.56 MW (6,115 hp)
- Acceleration: 0.7 m/s^{2} (2.3 ft/s^{2}) (0–30 km/h (0–19 mph)); 0.3 m/s^{2} (0.98 ft/s^{2}) (0–130 km/h (0–81 mph))
- Deceleration: 1 m/s^{2} (3.3 ft/s^{2}) (service); 1.2 m/s^{2} (3.9 ft/s^{2}) (emergency)
- Electric system: 25 kV 60 Hz AC (nominal) from overhead catenary
- Current collection: Pantograph
- UIC classification: 2′2′+Bo′Bo′+2′2′+Bo′Bo′+2′2′+Bo′Bo′+2′2′+Bo′Bo′+Bo′Bo′+2′2′+Bo′Bo′+2′2′
- Bogies: KH-279 (powered), KH-280 (trailer)
- Safety system: ATP (ERTMS/ETCS Level 1)
- Track gauge: 1,067 mm (3 ft 6 in)

Notes/references
- Sourced from unless otherwise stated.

The EMU3000 series is a series of electric multiple unit trains operated by the Taiwan Railway Corporation (TR). The trains are built by Hitachi Rail as inter-city trains and entered passenger service on 29 December 2021.

== History ==
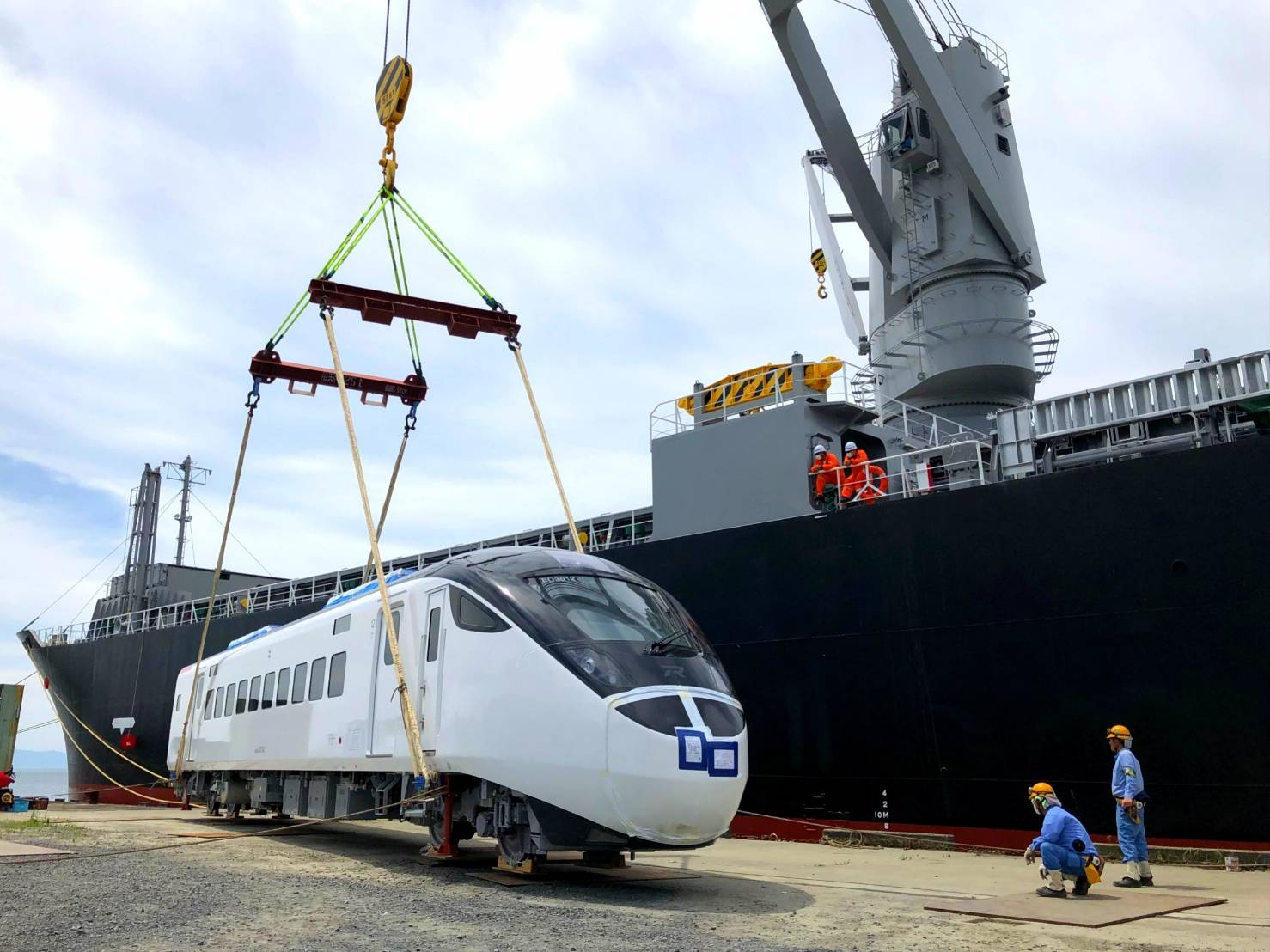
The first EMU3000 series train being loaded in the Port of Kudamatsu.

The EMU3000 series was purchased as part of the then Taiwan Railways Administration's (TRA) plan to replace its aging fleet by 2024. That plan called for the purchase of 600 intercity cars, 520 commuter cars (EMU900 series), 102 locomotives, and 60 un-electrified passenger cars. Additionally, the EMU3000 series was expected to increase TRA's service capacity in Eastern Taiwan, where demand for tickets is high and often sell out around major holidays.

Bidding for the intercity trains commenced in October 2018 and saw entries from two companies, Hitachi and Stadler. The TRA announced that Hitachi won the bid in December, and a contract was signed in January 2019 for NT$44.3 billion. The train's design was revealed to the public in November 2020.

The EMU3000 series are assembled in Hitachi's Kasado Plant in Kudamatsu, Yamaguchi Prefecture. While the first group of trains were slated to arrive in June 2021, the COVID-19 pandemic pushed back the trains' delivery. The first train was unloaded in the Port of Hualien on 31 July 2021. The remaining trains are scheduled to arrive by 2024.

== Features ==
The EMU3000 series runs in a 12-car formation, which is four cars longer than TR's last two intercity EMUs, the TEMU1000 series and the TEMU2000 series, which consist of 8 cars only. The train's exterior is designed around the concept of "silent flow" that is black and white with red accents. The interior of the train contains a total of 538 seats. The EMU3000 has a business class car branded as the Teng-yun Cabin (Chinese: 騰雲座艙; pinyin: Téngyún Zuòcāng) with larger seats, charging ports, internet access, and complimentary drinks and snacks.

Unlike its predecessors, the EMU3000 series does not have a tilting mechanism. According to Wang Kwo-tsai, the Minister of Transportation and Communications, improvements to track conditions in the past few years means that the tilting mechanism is unnecessary.
