= E1000 series =

Passenger train in Taiwan

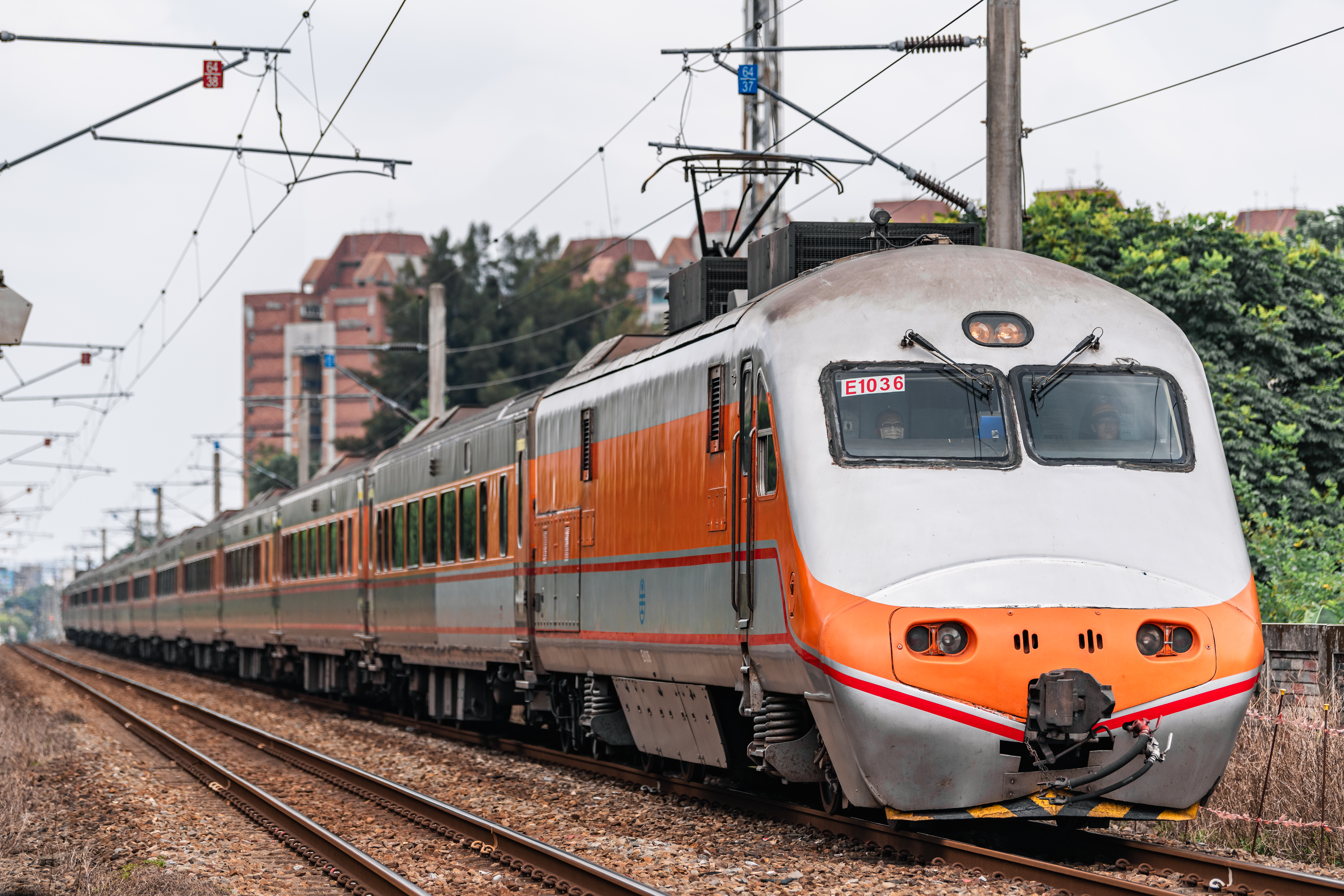
- In service: 1996–2026
- Manufacturers: Union Carriage & Wagon, GEC-Alsthom (locomotives); Hyundai Precision & Industries, Tang Eng Iron Works (passenger cars)
- Constructed: 1996–1997
- Entered service: 26 September 1996
- Number built: 64 locomotives
- Number in service: 60 locomotives (as at the end of 2022)
- Number scrapped: 3
- Predecessor: EMU100
- Successor: E500, EMU3000
- Fleet numbers: E1001–E1064

Specifications
- Train length: 17,211 mm (56 ft 5.6 in)
- Width: 2,885 mm (9 ft 5.6 in)
- Height: 4,265 mm (13 ft 11.9 in)
- Maximum speed: 130 km/h (81 mph)
- Weight: 60 t (59.1 long tons; 66.1 short tons)
- Axle load: 15 t (14.8 long tons; 16.5 short tons)
- Traction system: GEC Alsthom GTO–C/I
- Traction motors: 4 × GEC Alsthom 6FRA 3031 550 kW (740 hp) 3-phase AC induction motor
- Power output: 2.2 MW (3,000 hp)
- Tractive effort: 16,735 kgf (164,110 N; 36,890 lbf)
- Electric system: 25 kV 60 Hz AC (nominal) from overhead catenary
- Current collection: Pantograph
- UIC classification: Bo′Bo′
- Track gauge: 1,067 mm (3 ft 6 in)

The E1000 locomotive, commonly known as the PP Tze-chiang, is a series of electric push-pull trains used by the Taiwan Railway, operated as part of the Tze-chiang limited express service. The locomotives were built by Union Carriage & Wagon and GEC-Alsthom, while the passenger cars were built by the South Korean manufacturer Hyundai Precision & Industries and Tang Eng Iron Works.

== History ==
The E1000 series was built to replace the EMU100 series. In 1994, the TRA came to an agreement with a South Korean manufacturer Hyundai Precision & Industries to build 64 locomotives and 400 passenger cars for $7.2 billion NTD. Hyundai manufactured the passenger cars, while the locomotives were built by Union Carriage & Wagon and GEC-Alsthom. The first arrived in April 1996 and passenger services commenced on September 26 of the same year.

At the time of the units' arrival, trains were popular since they were first to use a streamlined design, contrasting with the boxy design of its predecessor. However, the TRA soon reported that the trains suffered from frequent traction motor failures and insufficient power delivery due to poor maintenance, oftentimes requiring a third locomotive to be attached to the rear as a backup. Due to the poor quality of stainless-steel painting processes at the time of production, the coaches were also not painted, but rather had stickers applied, which began to fade, mottle, and peel after exposure to weather and sunshine in service. The multitude of problems plaguing the class earned them the derisive nickname "Beggar Gang Train" among enthusiasts and the press. The poor state of repair, combined with paying-off of the maintenance contract's performance bond following Hyundai's merger with Rotem, and subsequent withdrawal of support staff from Taiwan in 2003, prompted TRA to sue the company in 2005 for $1.7 billion NTD in damages; however, the lawsuit never came to fruition. Nevertheless, in response, Minister of Transportation and Communications Lin Ling-san banned South Korean companies from participating in future transportation bids until problems with the E1000 and other South Korean-produced equipment are resolved. The two reached an agreement of $300 million NTD in 2018.

By 2010, remedial work to the locomotives done under supervision of Alstom had improved reliability, and the carriages began undergoing repainting to resolve the paint issues. Despite the problems, however, the E1000 series has been a regular fixture within the Tze-chiang family since entry into service owing to the large class size, and with the electrification of railroads, the E1000 has begun to replace DMU on East Coast Tze-chiang services. In a report from 2015 the TRA listed the E1000 series as one of the trains to be replaced in the near future as it approaches its 30-year lifespan. Starting from late 2024, E1000 series locomotives have started being replaced by Taiwan Railways E500 series locomotives manufactured by Toshiba, while retaining their original passenger coaches for regular Tze-Chiang Limited Express services.

== Features ==
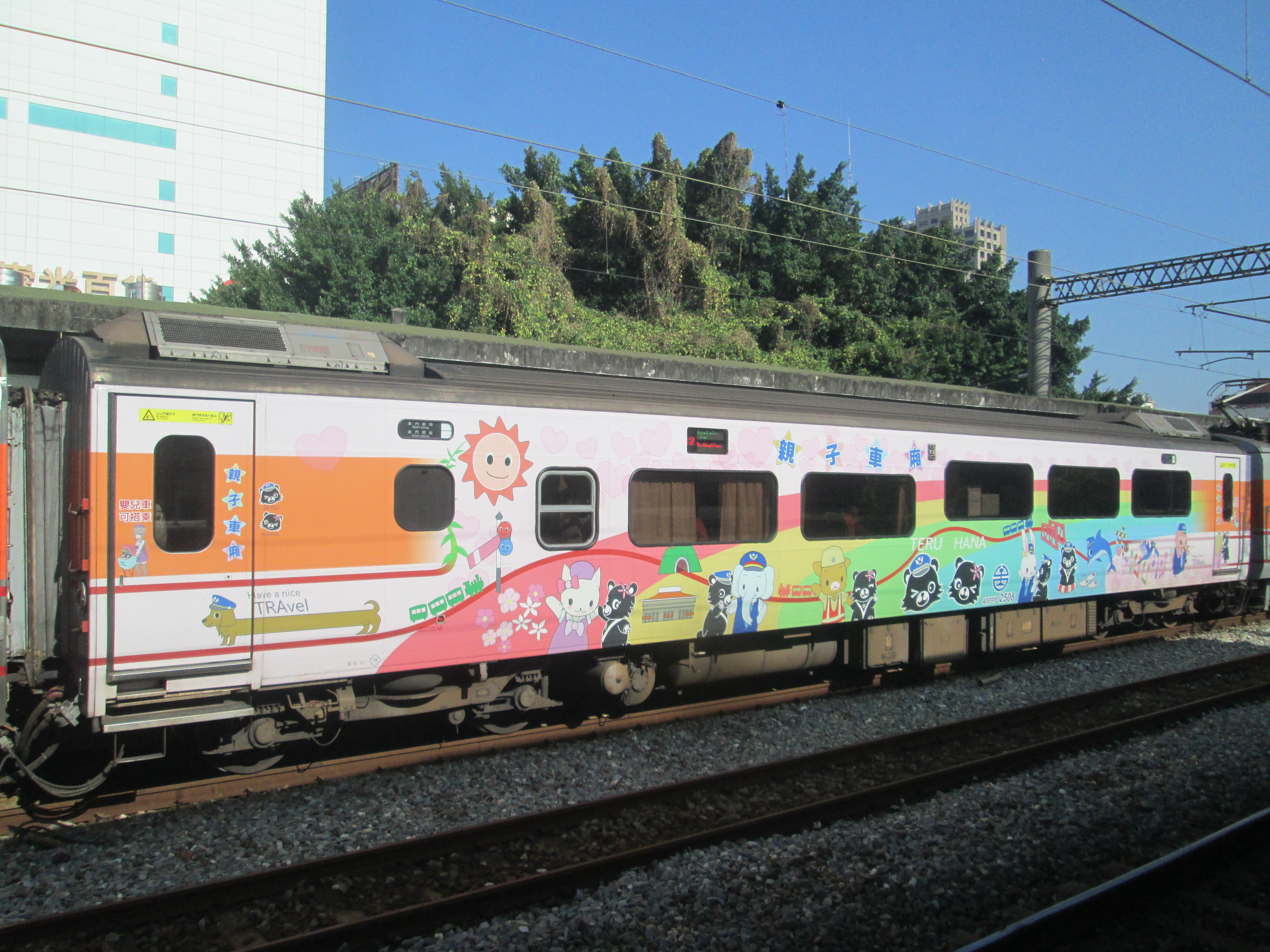
Livery of a family car

The E1000 series is configured in a push-pull arrangement, with a locomotive at each end of the train. Electricity is delivered via overhead lines, and each locomotive features four motors for a combined 2,336 kilowatts (3,133 hp) per locomotive. The trains are designed to run in 12-15 passenger car configurations. The bogies were supplied by Krauss-Maffei, while the braking system are supplied by Knorr-Bremse.

=== Dining cars and reconfiguration ===
Originally, the E1000 series featured 32 dining cars. When the TRA phased out on-board dining, the cars were briefly used as baggage cars. Currently, 11 of the dining cars are reconfigured as handicapped-accessible passenger cars, while 20 of the cars are reconfigured as "family cars", which feature a different seat layout, a children's play area, and breastfeeding rooms.

== See also ==
- Taroko Express
- Puyuma Express
