= Tze-chiang limited express =

Taiwanese passenger train service

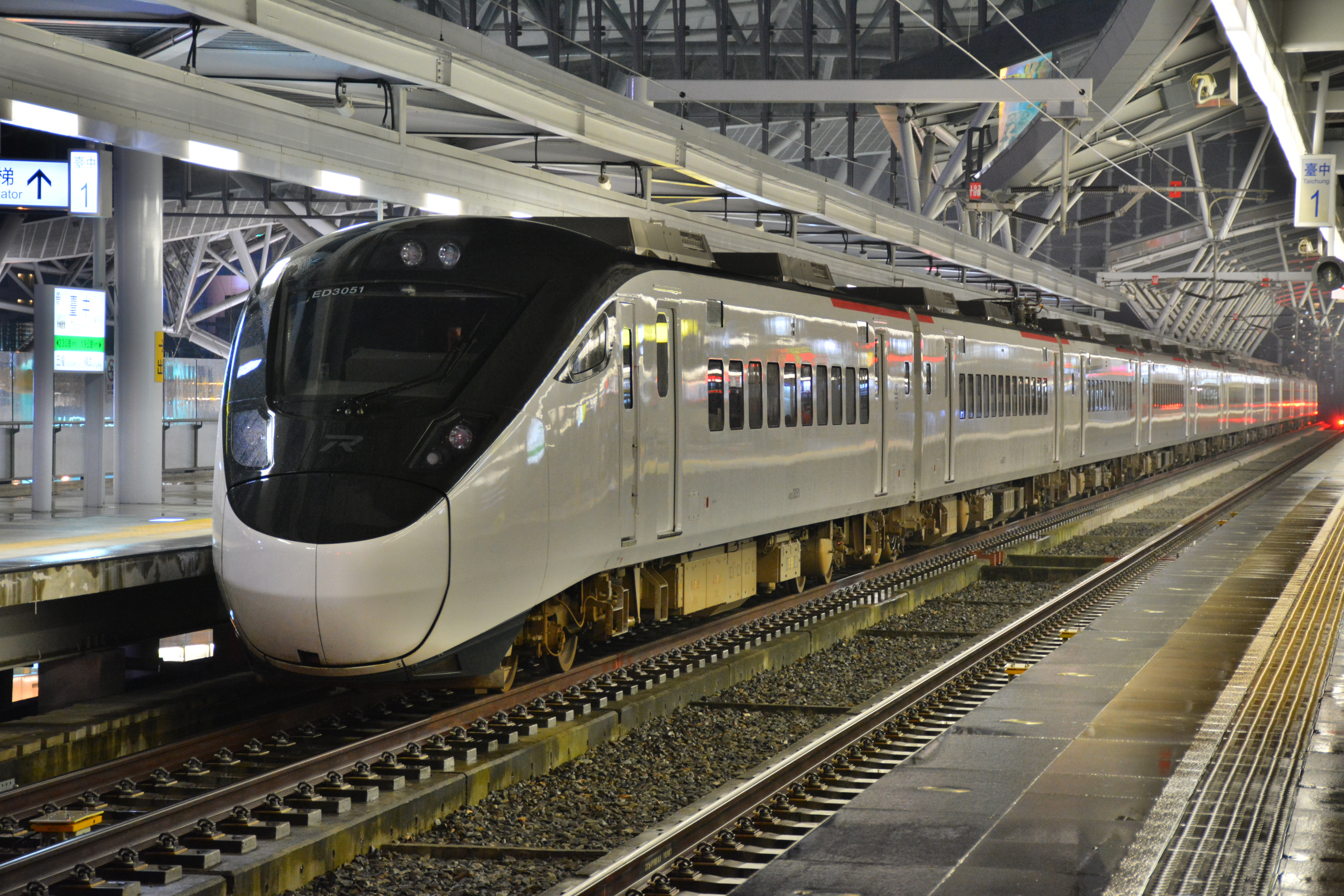
- An EMU3000 trainset on a Tze-Chiang Limited Express run, arriving at Taichung Station
- Traditional Chinese: 自強號
- Simplified Chinese: 自强号
Transcriptions
Standard Mandarin
- Hanyu Pinyin: Zìqiáng hào
- Bopomofo: ㄗˋ ㄑㄧㄤˊ ㄏㄠˋ
- Wade–Giles: Tzŭ^{4}-ch‘iang^{2} hao^{4}
- IPA: [tsɨ̂.tɕʰjǎŋ xâʊ]
Yue: Cantonese
- Yale Romanization: Jihkèuhng houh
- Jyutping: zi6 koeng4 hou6
- IPA: [tsi˨.kʰœŋ˩ hɔw˨]
Southern Min
- Hokkien POJ: Chū-kiông hō
- Tâi-lô: Tsū-kiông hō

Tze-Chiang (Chinese: 自強號; pinyin: Zìqiáng hào), also Tzu-chiang or Ziqiang, is a type of limited express train service operated by Taiwan Railway (TR). Of the five service classes operated by TR, the Tze-Chiang service is the fastest. Ticketing is done on the basis of mileage (NT$2.70 per km with a 10 km minimum fee as of 2026).

This service is operated with 5 different trainsets: the E1000 series, EMU3000, TEMU1000 (Taroko Express), DR3100, and the TEMU2000 (Puyuma Express). The now-retired EMU100 was the first trainset built for this service, which was used for 30 years, and was withdrawn from service on June 15, 2009.

== Introduction ==
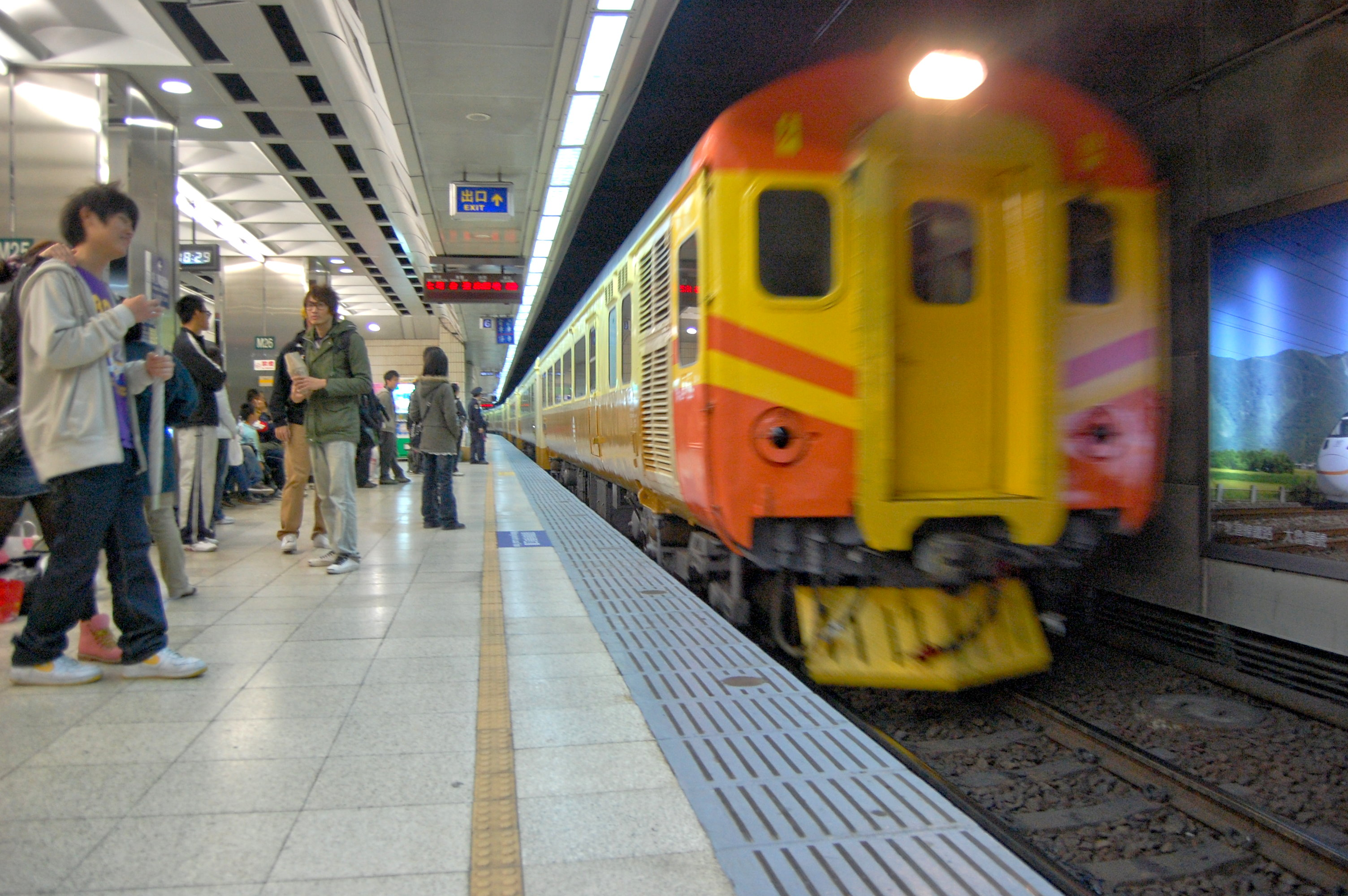
Taipei Main Station's less-crowded underground platform with a British Rail Engineering Limited EMU100.

Taiwan Railways' West Coast Mainline (WCML) Electrification Project was completed in 1978, leading wholesale timetable recast on the WCML. At about the same time, the new EMU100 vehicles ordered for express passenger service on the WCML was introduced. Up until this point, the highest-class passenger train on the WCML had been the diesel and electric locomotive hauled Kwan-Kung (Tourist) Express, which was phased out of service on 25 April 1978. All express passenger schedules were re-allocated to a new class of deluxe electric express service, and the Chu-Kuang Express (introduced earlier in 1970).

Tze-chiang was so-named from a phrase in an address that Chiang Kai-shek, the former President of Republic of China (Taiwan), delivered to his countrymen on 26 October 1971 in response to United Nations Resolution 2758, in which he urged the country to "Respect the Homeland, Strengthen Self ("Tzu-chiang"); Respond to Change without Fear." U.N. Resolution 2758 formally recognised Beijing as the government of "China" and de-recognized Taipei, at the same time revoking Taipei's U.N. membership. For this reason, the Tzu-chiang is also sometimes referred to as the "Self-Strengthening Express".

The EMU100 "electric express" was formally introduced on 15 August 1978 at a fare of NT$1.32 per kilometer. The first services operated between Taipei and Taichung (via Coast Line), and as electric catenaries were erected, switched to operating via Mountain Line. As the service was extended to Chiayi and Tainan, the service was formally christened "Tze-Chiang Limited Express". As electrification progressed, the service was eventually extended to between Keelung and Kaohsiung.

After 1980, other equipment was introduced and assigned to Tze-Chiang service, including EMU200, EMU300, E1000 Push-Pull, TEMU1000 tilting train on electrified lines, and DR2800, DR2900, and DR3000 on non-electrified lines. From 6 July 1991 through 31 March 1992, the Taiwan Railways Administration (TRA) piloted business class service on selected departures. However, due to low ticket sales, the experiment was terminated. In 2010, TRA redesignated certain former business class coaches (BCK) on the Chu-Kuang Express as Tzu-chiang.

As of 2013, the next generation of tilting trains, designated the TEMU2000 series, has been introduced into commercial service. They are intended to replace the DR2800, DR2900, and DR3000 series of DMUs as the Eastern Line's electrification completes.

== History ==
=== First generation Tzu-chiang (EMU100) ===
In the early 1970s, the West Coast Mainline Electrification Scheme was already planned. Taiwan Railways had ordered 94 electric locomotives, and also 13 five-car electric multiple unit sets from General Electric Company. Identified as the EMU100 series, the set included driving power coach 50EP100, motor coach 55EM100, two trailers 40ET100, and driving trailer 40ED100. The sets were assembled by British Rail Engineering Limited's York Carriage Works in 1976. Throughout 1978 the sets were delivered to Taiwan for testing and acceptance.

Although full service was inaugurated on 15 August 1978, within a month the EMU100 units had been temporarily sidelined due to air conditioning trouble and various component issues. The 50-ton motor power coach (50EP100), which contained the 25 kV AC main transformer, was too heavy and caused bogie suspension stress issues, and was a safety concern when operating at high speeds. After four month of intensive troubleshooting involving TRA Mechanical section and the original equipment manufacturers, the vehicles were re-launched on 2 January 1979 in revenue passenger service. It was not until 1 July 1979, when the West Coast Mainline Electrification Project had reached substantial completion throughout its entire project length, had Tzu-chiang been able to reach its full potential of operating at 120 km/h. Taking 4 hours and 10 minutes between Taipei and Kaohsiung, the EMU100 broke prior service speed records set by the White Steel Train DR2700 diesel multiple unit operating as the Kuang-Hwa Express, and became TRA's newest-generation premier express.

=== Second generation Tzu-chiang (EMU200) ===
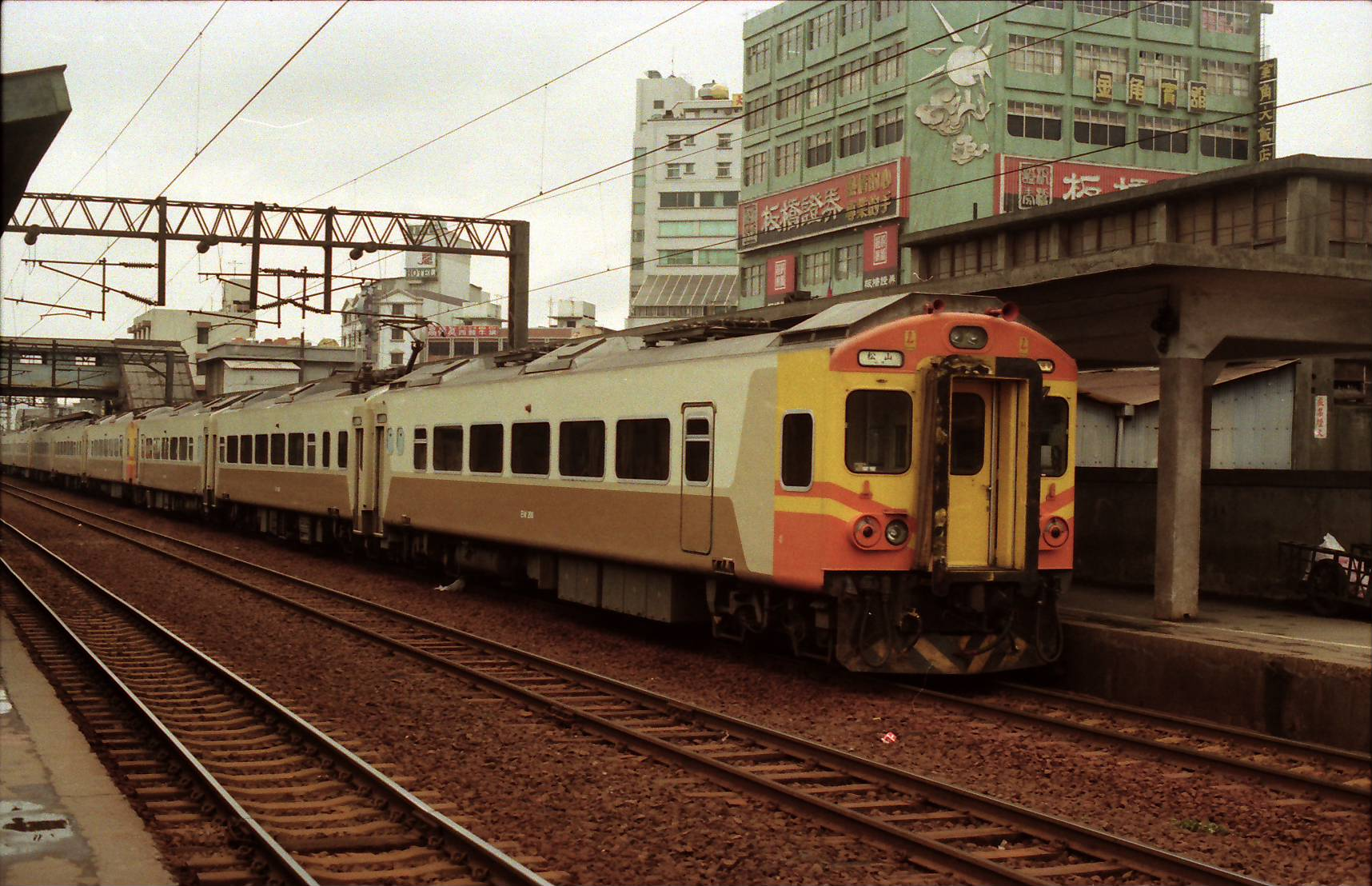
Trainset number 206 of EMU200, at Banqiao station on the ground level, Western Line, Taiwan Railway Administration, 1989.

In the mid-1980s, Taiwan experienced significant economic growth and increased living standards. As people became more affluent, the Tzu-chiang train was no longer considered a privilege of the elite. The EMU100 often operated at full capacity, in sold out conditions. TRA thus planned to purchase a second generation of Tzu-chiang EMUs, to improve service frequency and relieve congestion. In the Budget Year 1984–85, funds were made available to order 11 sets of three-car EMU200 units from Union Carriage & Wagon works of South Africa.

This order of Tzu-chiang EMUs were configured in three car sets, including driving motor coach (with conductor's or guard's office) 55EMC200, transformer power 45EP200, and driving motor coach 55EM200. The new EMUs were delivered in 1986, with eight sets delivered assembled, but three sets delivered as kits and assembled locally by Tang Eng Iron Works as a technology-transfer program. Most had been accepted into service by June 1987.

=== Tzu-chiang's Socimi complications (EMU300) ===
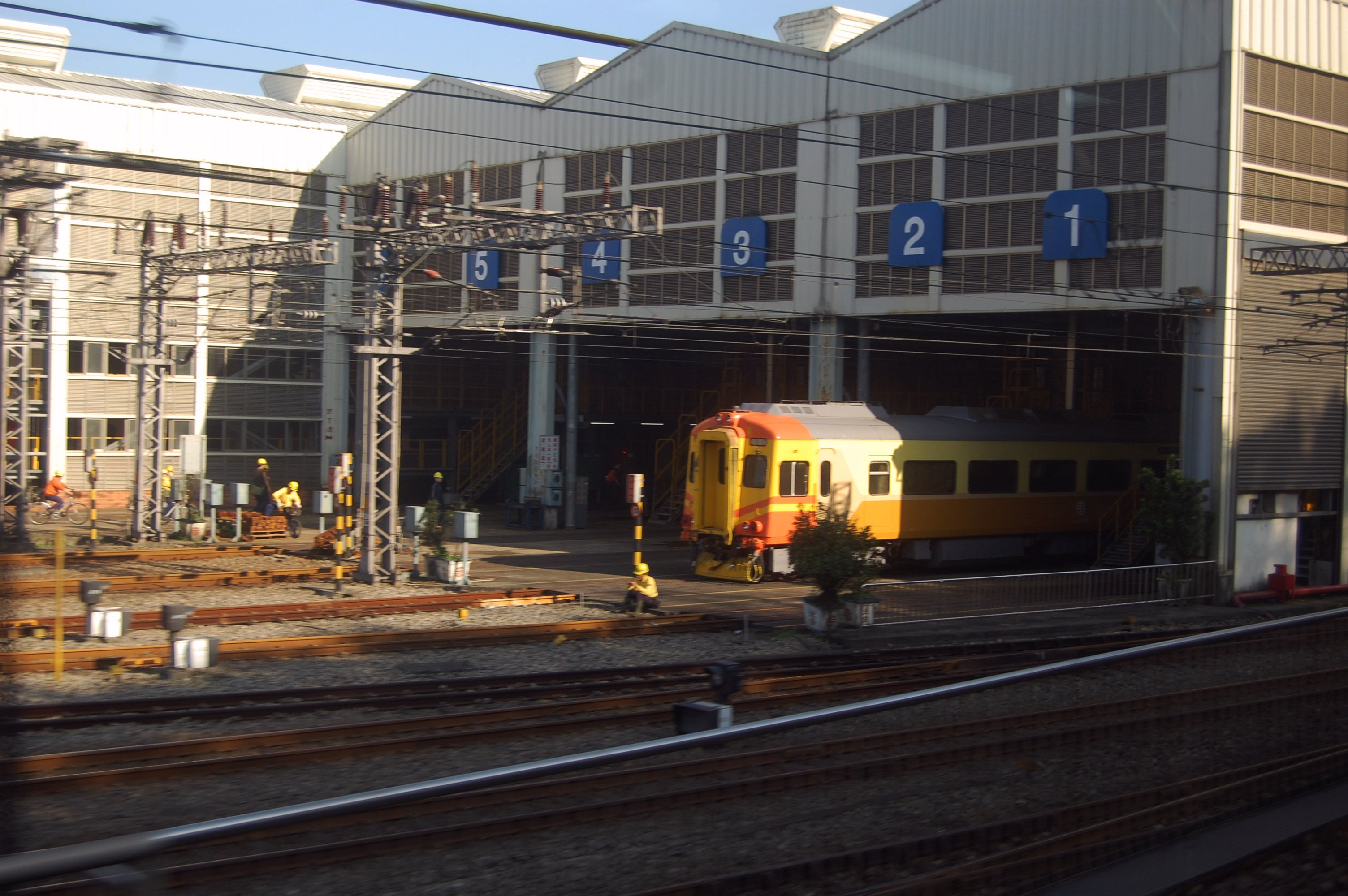
Underground urban trackage and run-through services in Taiwan make efficient use of assets and available track capacity. An Italian Socimi EMU300 trainset is being prepared at the Qidu carbarn

During the 1985 bidding for EMU200, due to various procurement irregularities, the Italian Socimi carbuilder protested the award. TRA chose to use funds from Budget Year 1986 and place a further order for EMU300 with Socimi even before all EMU200 sets were accepted for service. The further order was intended for extra capacity relief. The carbody was built by Socimi in Milan, Italy, whereas the British firm of Brush Traction in Loughborough supplied electrical equipment. Based on the TRA Four Year Car Equipment Strategy, the EMU300 was considered a "complication" (節外生枝).

Tzu-chiang EMU300 was a fleet of eight sets (24 cars), including driving motor coach (with guard's office) 50EMC300, transformer power coach 45EP300, and driving motor coach 50EM300. During 1988, most of the carbody and electrical equipment were completed and shipped to Taiwan for testing. However, after delivering the last set of the order (EMU308), Socimi unexpectedly declared bankruptcy and ceased operations. This resulted in an immediate parts shortage, therefore almost as soon as delivered, EMU308 was sacrificed to provide parts (termed a 'Christmas Tree').

Despite these issues, the TRA had high expectation for the EMU300, due to its 130 km/h service capability. During the 2 September 1989 schedule revision, the EMU300 was assigned to direct and semi-direct Tzu-chiang Express, stopping at fewer stations than regular Tzu-chiang. Train No. 1019 was scheduled for 3 hours and 47 minutes between Taipei and Kaohsiung (via Coast Line), breaking the previous speed record set by the EMU100. Amongst railfans, the EMU300 became something of an urban legend, often unofficially called Tzu-chiang Super Express or Tzu-chiang Tokkyu. Even after the introduction of the much more powerful E1000 Push-Pull trainset, remanufactured EMU200 trainsets, and TEMU series of tilting trains, this speed record remained unbroken.

Around the same time, TRA began ordering the first of several series of DMUs, starting with the DR2800 series from Tokyu Car, a derivative of the American Budd Company's proven Rail Diesel Car design, introducing the new service to non-electrified lines. These were followed up with the DR2900 series, built with a modified exterior but to the same essential by Nippon Sharyo. A subsequent order incorporated enough differences to warrant a separate designation, and these were labelled the DR3000 class despite being of the same design. The final series of DMUs for this service would be the DR3100 series, ordered in the early 2000s as a way to minimize development costs for the concurrent DR1000 series of commuter DMUs, with which they shared many characteristics, both in appearance and machinery. With the entire length of TRA's main lines electrified, there have been no subsequent orders for DMUs.

=== Fleet expansion and modernization (E1000 and EMU200 rebuild) ===
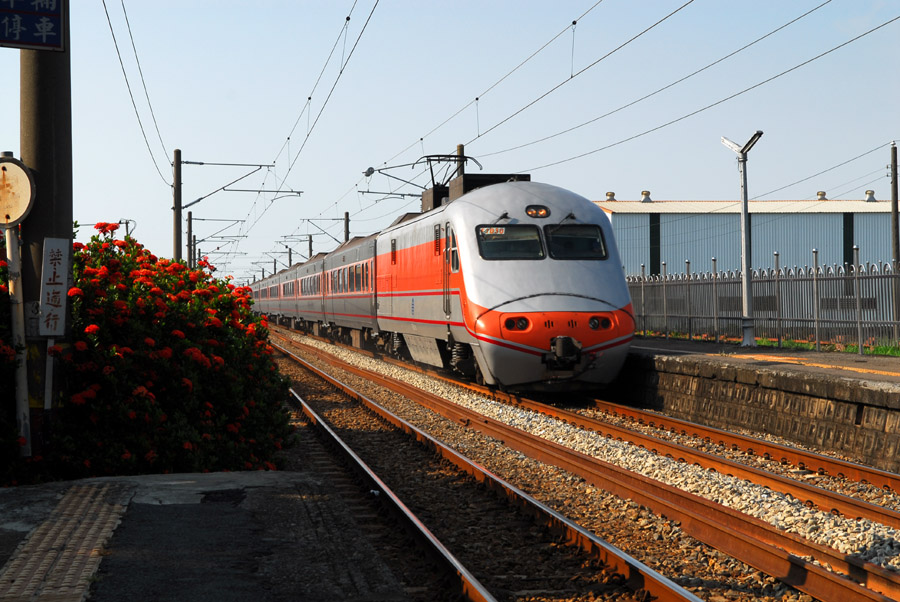
E1000 push-pull Tzu-chiang at Liaoying Station

In 1996, as part of a massive modernization program, TRA placed an order for 64 electric locomotives from Union Carriage & Wagon and 384 passenger cars from Hyundai Precision and Industries to expand the service. Rated at 6600 hp apiece, the E1000 was and still is TRA's most powerful locomotive. The units were arranged into trainsets of fourteen units, with two locomotives bracketing 12 coaches. As part of TRA's attempt to attract riders in 2002, 32 restaurant cars were ordered to supplement the trainsets. However, with the elimination of dining service, these were converted to baggage cars. With the withdrawal of the EMU100 series from regular service, the E1000 has established itself as the backbone of the TRA's long-distance fleet, though it has found its role undermined by delivery of the TEMU lineup.

Allegedly, TRA encountered legal troubles with Hyundai during the delivery of the cars, as the order had been placed with Daewoo shortly before the company merged with the rolling stock division of Hyundai P&I and formed what became Hyundai Rotem. The latter disagreed with the terms of the contract, and a lawsuit was filed by TRA. However, the suit was settled out-of-court, with Hyundai Rotem given the go-ahead to finish TRA's massive order of EMU500-series commuter trains from Daewoo, while TRA was given the option to purchase new EMU600 series trains and received its E1000 cars under the original contract.

In 2008, TRA commissioned the first of its rebuilt EMU200 trainsets as part of an internal rebuild program. The program consisted of forming a single 9-car trainset out of what was previously 3 3-car trainsets, and to this end the majority of the EMU200 cabs were converted to coaches, with the remainder receiving a completely re-designed front end. The trains were also fitted with completely new interiors, LED displays, and other systems, however the project ran severely over-budget, which resulted in upgrades to the original EMUs' electrical and propulsion systems never being carried out. The new EMUs debuted in a red-and-white livery and were redesignated in the 1200 series for unknown reasons, hence the designation EMU1200 has also been used to refer to the re-manufactured units.

Within several years of entering service, however, serious design faults emerged with the rebuilt EMUs. Most notably, their original electrical components, though refurbished, had never been designed to withstand the additional load created by the train's new systems, and as a result the trains suffered frequent failures of their electrical systems. While the EMU1200 remain in service, as of 2015 this is by the barest margin; only one of the 9-car sets was operational.

=== New EMUs (TEMU1000, TEMU2000, and EMU3000) ===
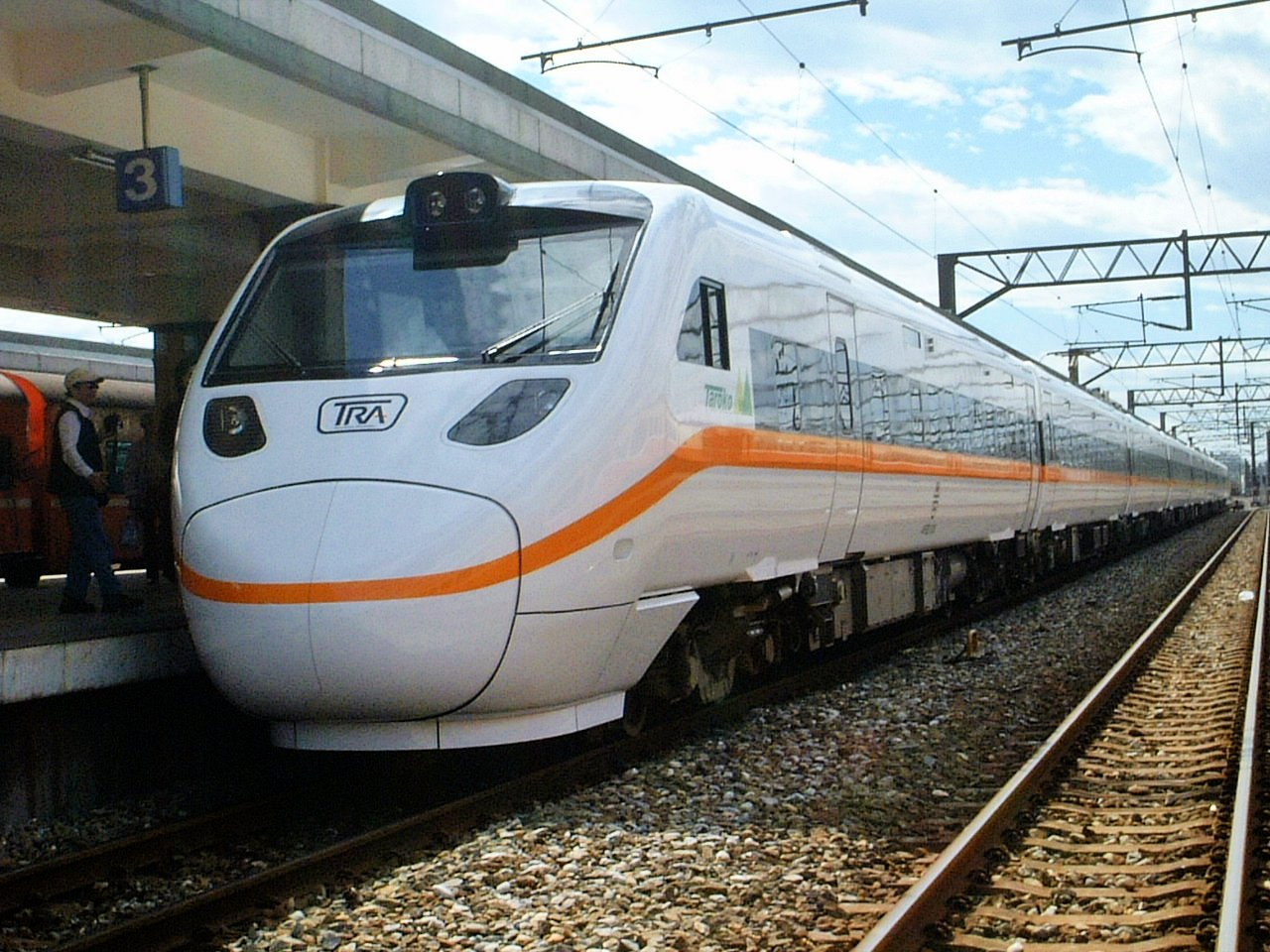
A TEMU1000 Taroko Express.

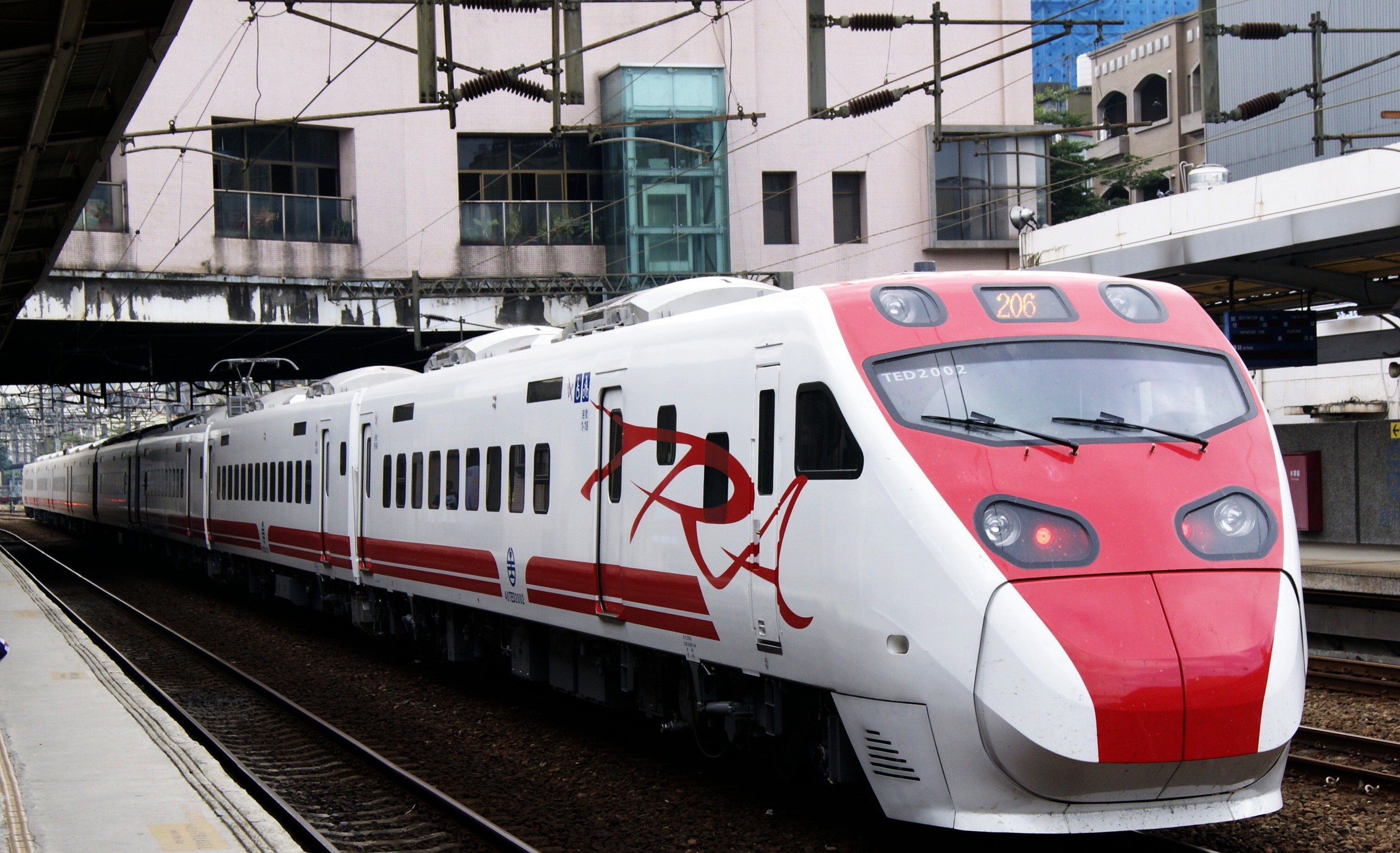
A TEMU2000 Puyuma Express.

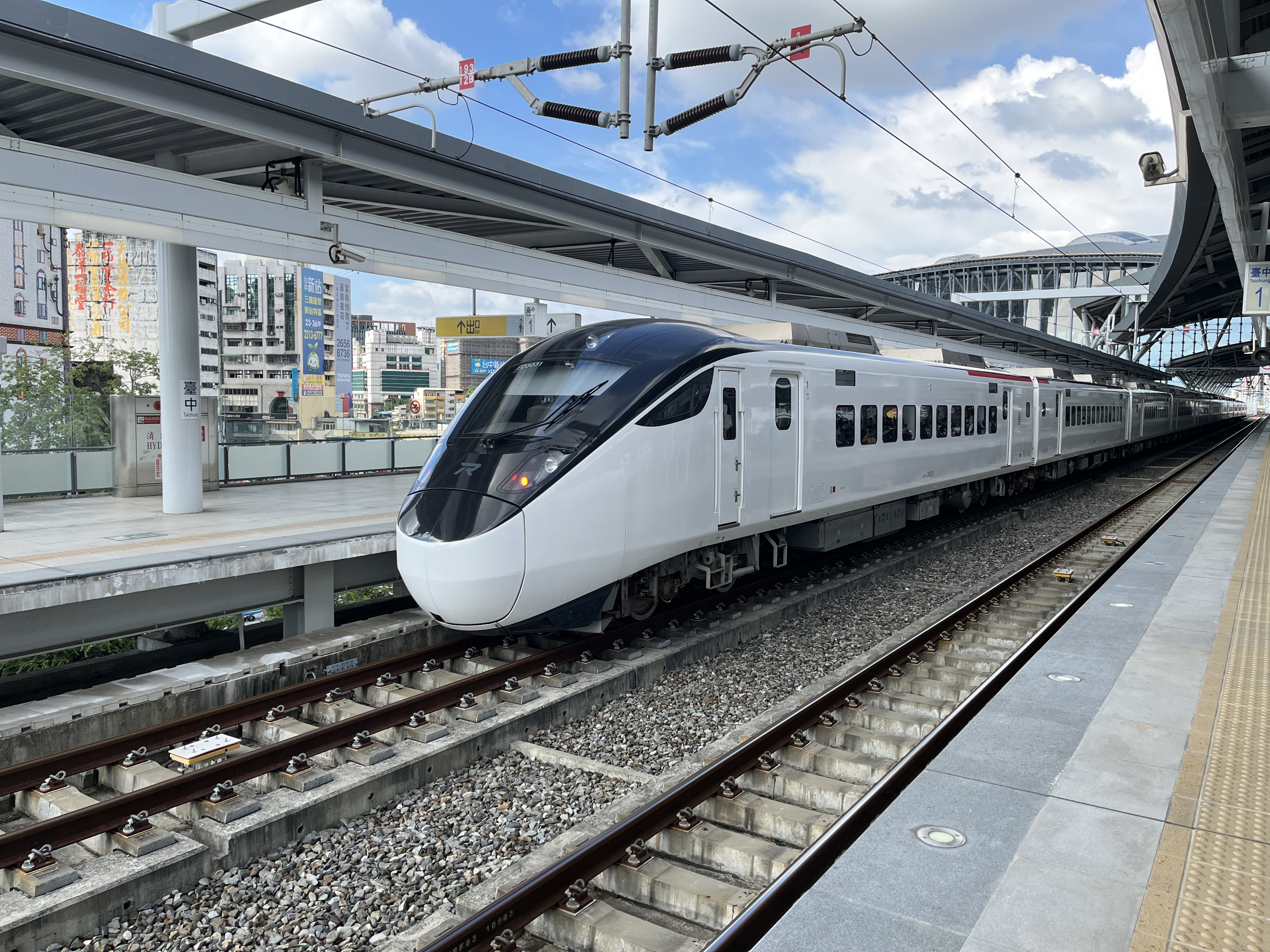
The latest EMU3000 entered passenger service on 29 December 2021.

In 2006, TRA took delivery of its first tilting trains, the TEMU1000, a series based on the JR 885 series. With a maximum operational speed of 130 km/h and the ability to round curves 25 km/h faster than the TRA's other trains, the TEMU1000s were ideal for services on the Yilan Line, with its many curves. Though initially christened under the banner of Taroko Express, the trains were soon relegated to regular Tze-Chiang service-level, the only difference between them and other trains being their routes: between Taipei/Hsinchu/Shulin and Hualien and Kaohsiung and Changhua, though some have been seen on longer-distance runs from Kaohsiung to Hualien now that the EMU200 and EMU300 series trains are being withdrawn.

Impressed with the TEMU1000 series, TRA placed an order for 34 second-generation TEMU2000 series trainsets in 2010, with deliveries beginning in 2012. The TEMU2000 is based loosely off of the N700 Shinkansen, however it is for the most part an independent design. The TEMU2000 entered commercial service on 6 February 2013. They have supplemented also supplemented the E1000 series and their older cousins in long-distance service. Similarly to the TEMU1000, the trainsets are dubbed Puyuma Express, though, like the Taroko title the TEMU1000s bear, it does not have any practical meaning.

In 2018, TRA announced that they will acquire newer EMUs used on the Tze-chiang services to replace the aging fleet of E1000s push-pull trains. The new sets, the EMU3000 series, which consists of 12 cars per set, entered service in August 2021, and deliveries are expected to be completed by 2024. Similar to Taiwan High Speed Rail's 700T Series, and unlike the older sets, the EMU3000 has a business class car with larger seats, charging ports, internet access, and complimentary drinks and snacks.

== Naming ==
Taiwan Railways in 1976 chose the name Tzu-chiang through the use of a riders' panel, based on forty internally selected names given in interviews of over 3,000 randomly selected riders, tallied and reported to the provincial government for final decision. These internally selected names included Kai-Shek (Chung-Cheng), President (Zong Tong), Fearless (Wu De), Humble (Ji Che), Divine State (Shen Ju), Counterattack (Fan Gong, a reference to the national desire to take military action against Mainland China at that time), East China Sea (Tong Hi), Safety (Ping An), Etiquette (Lee Yee), Human Rights (Ren Chen), Victory (Sheng Li), Freedom (Zee Yu), Complexity of God (Fu Shen), Practical (Tah She), Four Virtues (Sss Wae), etc. The statistics showed that Tzu-chiang, Victory, and Freedom were the top choices gathering 33% of votes each. TRA reported this finding to Provincial government, and the provincial chairman Hsieh Tung-Min at the time chose the name Tzu-chiang, hoping that these cars will Respect the Homeland, Strengthen Self (Tzu-chiang); Respond to Change without Fear (莊敬自強，處變不驚), and can Self-Strengthen Without Rest (自強不息).

Taiwan Railway printed various Edmondson tickets during the early days of Tzu-chiang operations. Some tickets were printed in a landscape form factor (rather than the usual portrait), and are termed 'Wide Tze Chiang' by ticket collecting enthusiasts. In the early days of Tzu-chiang, the timetable showed a variety of inconsistent names, such as "Electric Special Express", "Tzu-chiang Special Express", etc.

== Operations ==
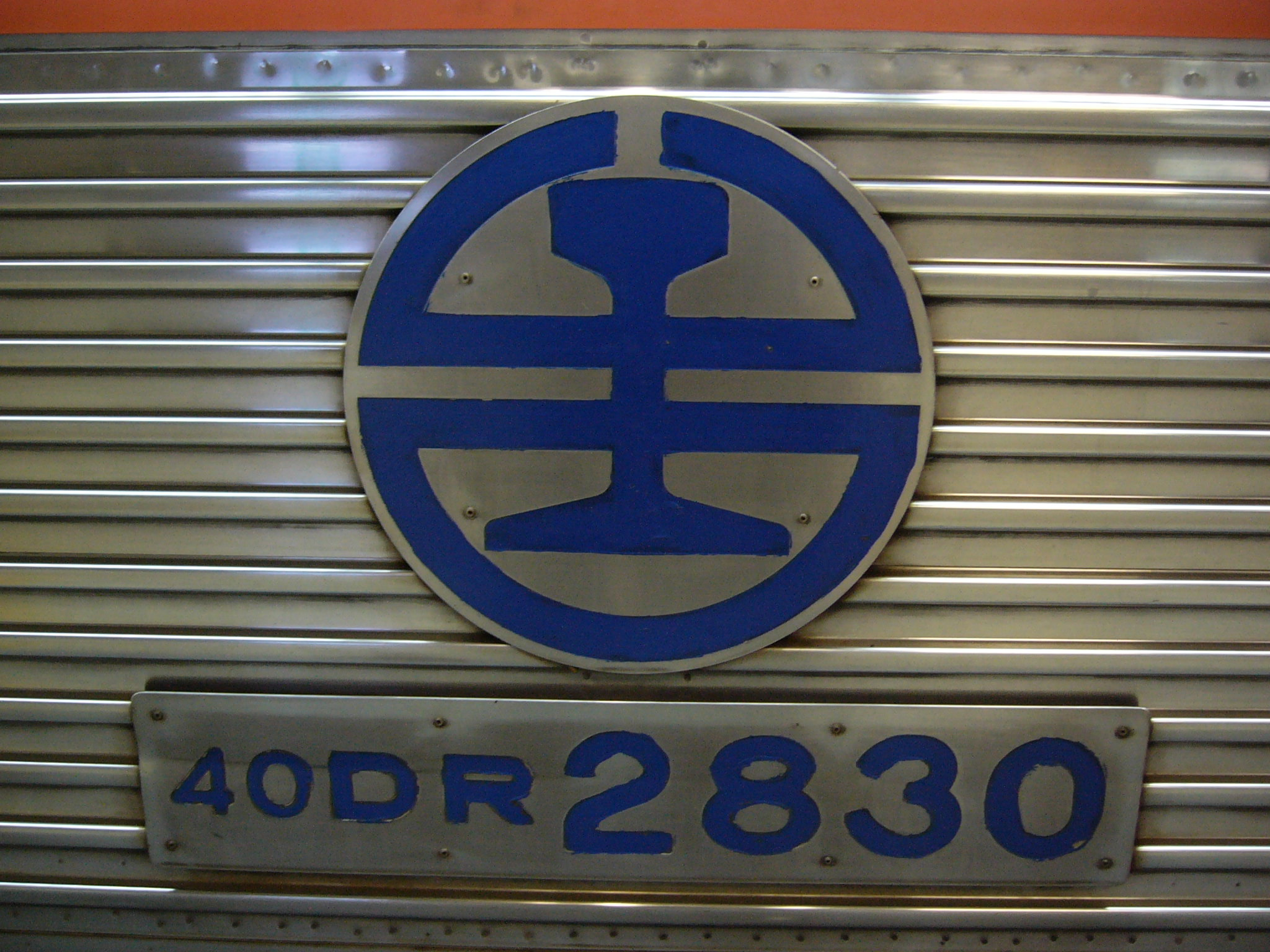
Identification plate and the TRA logo on a "Budd Car" DR2800 diesel multiple unit (Fabricated under licence by Tokyu Car.)

Although different equipment is used to fulfill express schedules, the same fare is charged for the service. Based on 2008 fare tariff, the per-mile fare basis was NT$2.27 per kilometer. Taipei (via West Coast Mainline) to Kaohsiung is NT$845; to Pingtung is NT$893; (via East Coast Mainline) to Hualien is NT$441, and (via diesel DMU service) to Taitung is NT$786. Although Tzu-chiang is formally classified as a long-distance train, TR also sells unreserved tickets and contactless fare media (e.g. EasyCard) is accepted, as well as regional Taiwan commuter Passes (TPASS) provided that one's journey starts and ends at a station covered by said region's TPASS. Therefore, many Taiwanese passengers use trains classified in this class as a commuter train. This unreserved or contactless fare ticketing system is not valid for any Tzu-Chiang services operated by Taroko Express, Puyuma Express, or EMU3000 trainsets however; reserved seating must be booked in advance for these trains, regardless of distance or city pair travelled.

Tzu-chiang has very few stops, and station dwell time is a small portion of the total trip time, and therefore is preferred by many passengers. Although it is not a commuter train, the annual passenger count on Tzu-chiang consists of 20% of Taiwan Railways’ total ridership. Below is a sample of running times based on the 23 December 2010 schedule:

- Taipei to Kaohsiung: Southbound shortest trip takes 3 hours 36 minutes (Train# 111); Northbound shortest trip is 3 hours 36 minutes (Train# 136)
- Taipei to Pingtung: Southbound shortest trip takes 3 hours 57 minutes (Train# 111); Northbound shortest trip is 3 hours 56 minutes (Train# 136)
- Taipei to Hualien: Southbound shortest trip takes 2 hours exactly (Train# 402, 408, 426, 436, 438); Northbound shortest trip is 2 hours exactly (Train# 417, 441)
- Taipei to Taitung: Southbound shortest trip takes 3 hours 30 minutes (Trains 402, 426); Northbound shortest trip is 3 hours 30 minutes (Train# 417, 441)

== Gallery ==
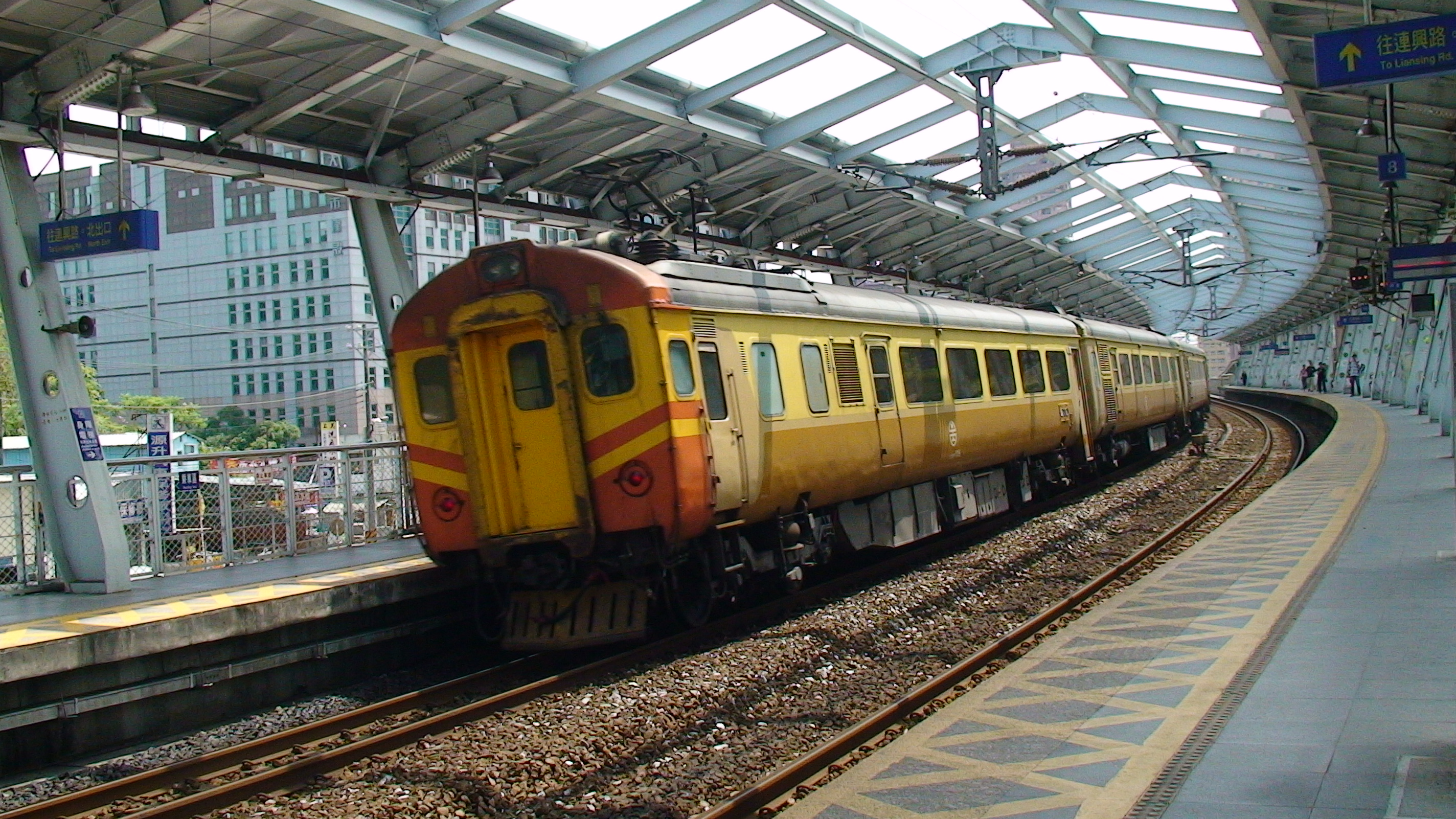
EMU100 Tzu-chiang at Xike Station

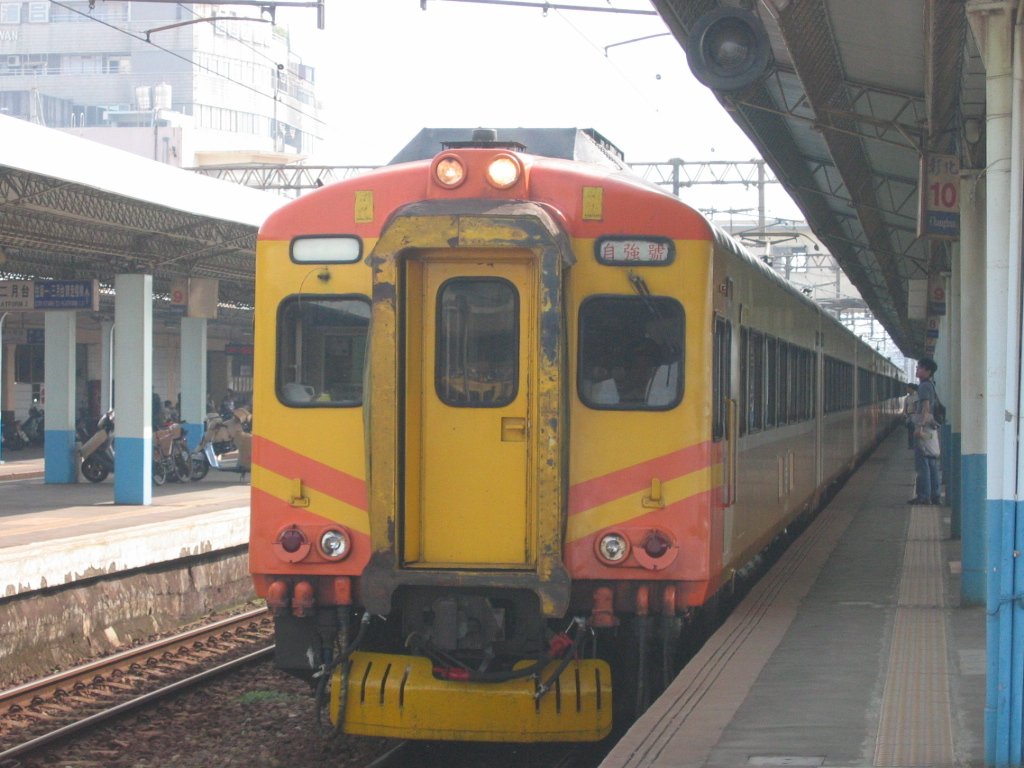
EMU300 Tzu-chiang at Changhua Station

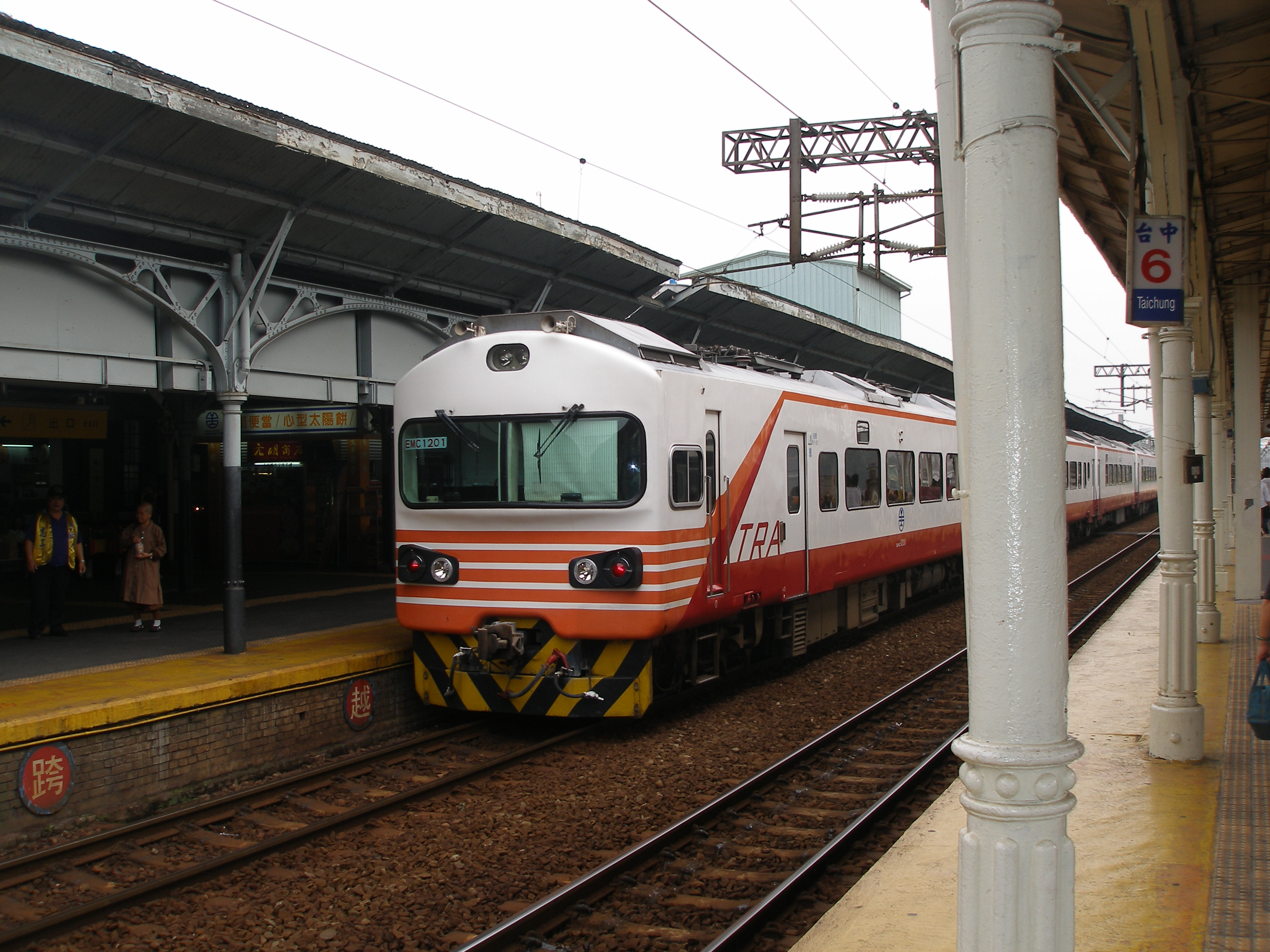
EMU1200 Tzu-chiang at Taichung TRA station

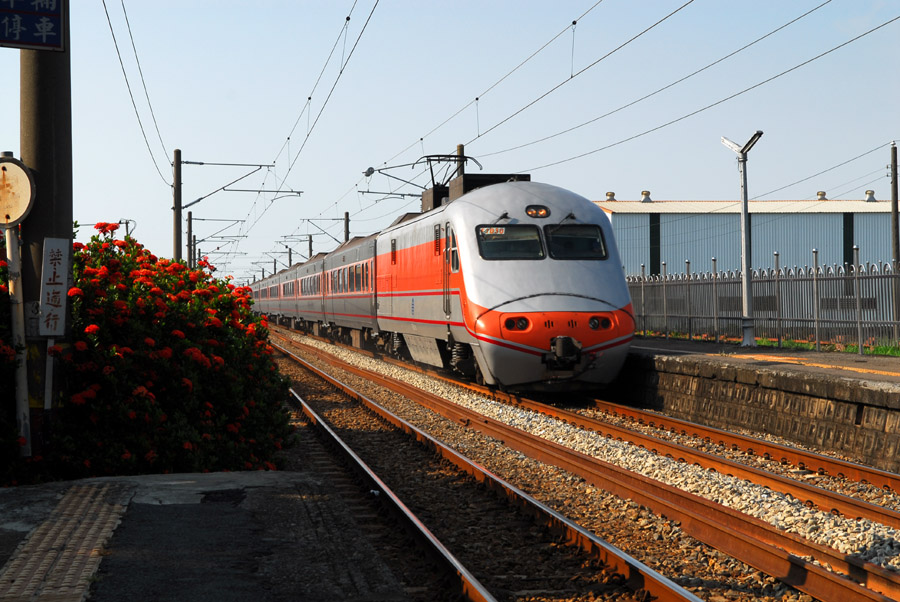
E1000 push-pull Tzu-chiang at Liaoying Station

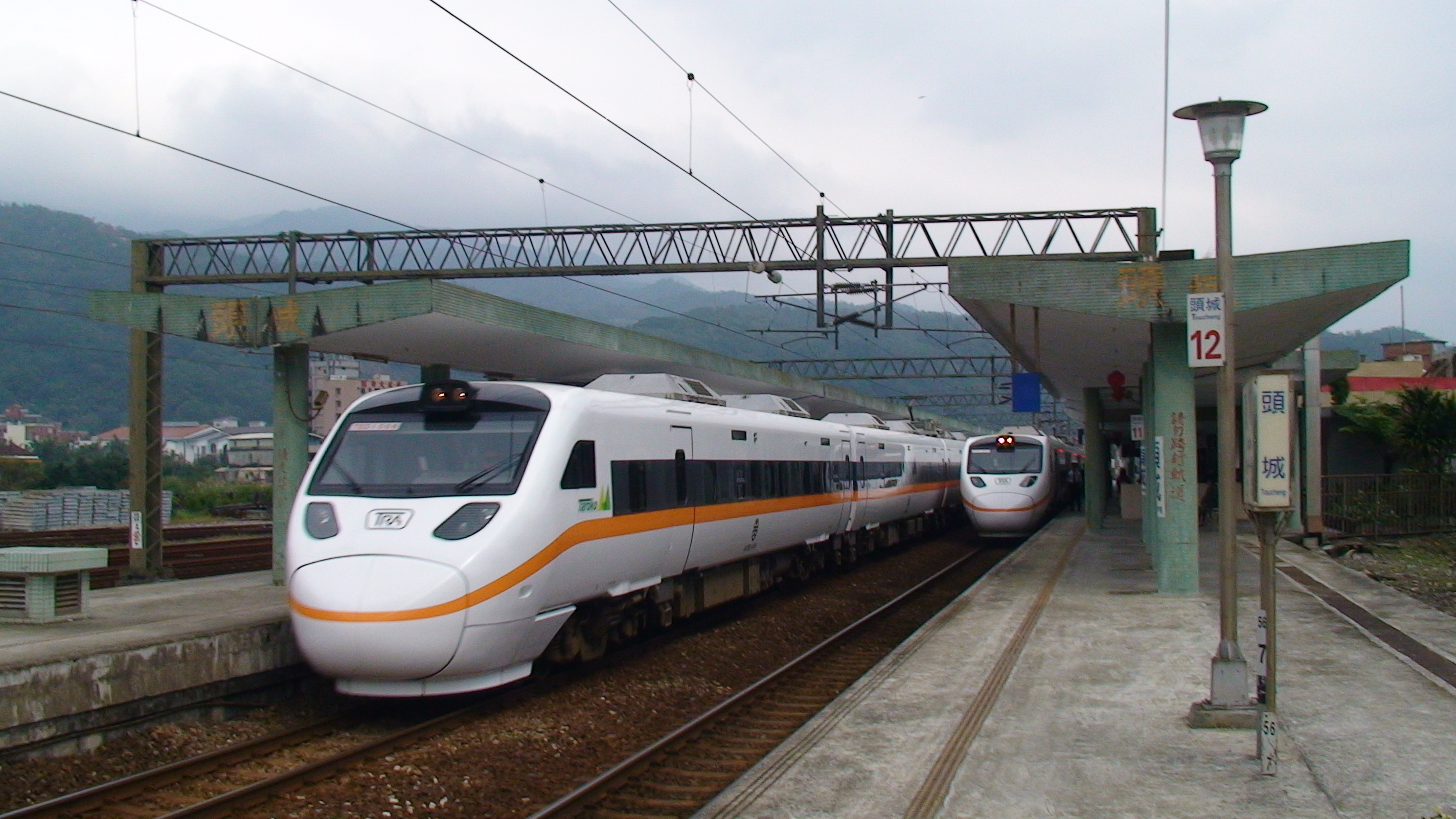
TEMU1000 Taroko Express at Toucheng Station

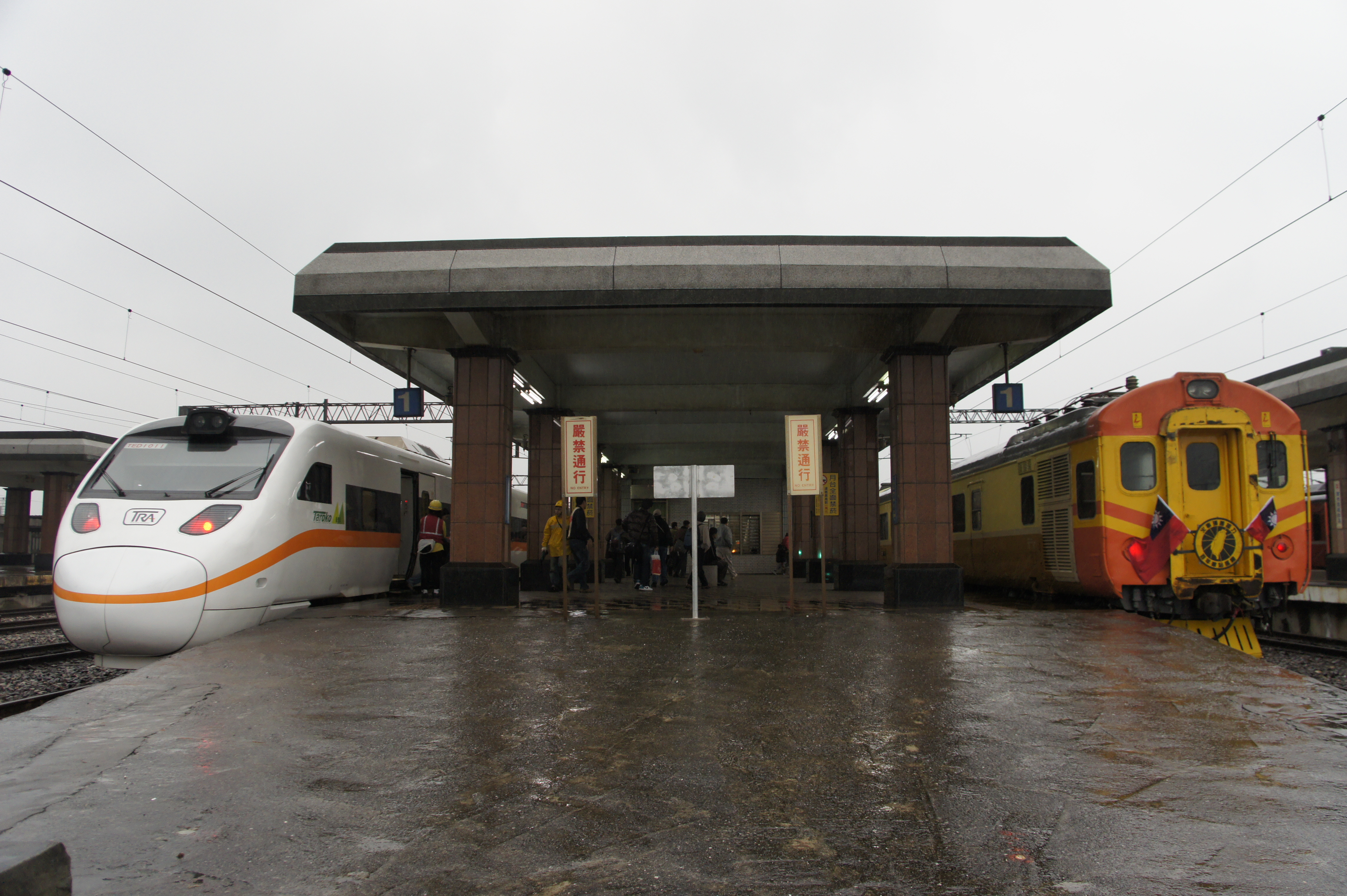
A TEMU1000 and an EMU100 Tzu-chiang at Hualien Station

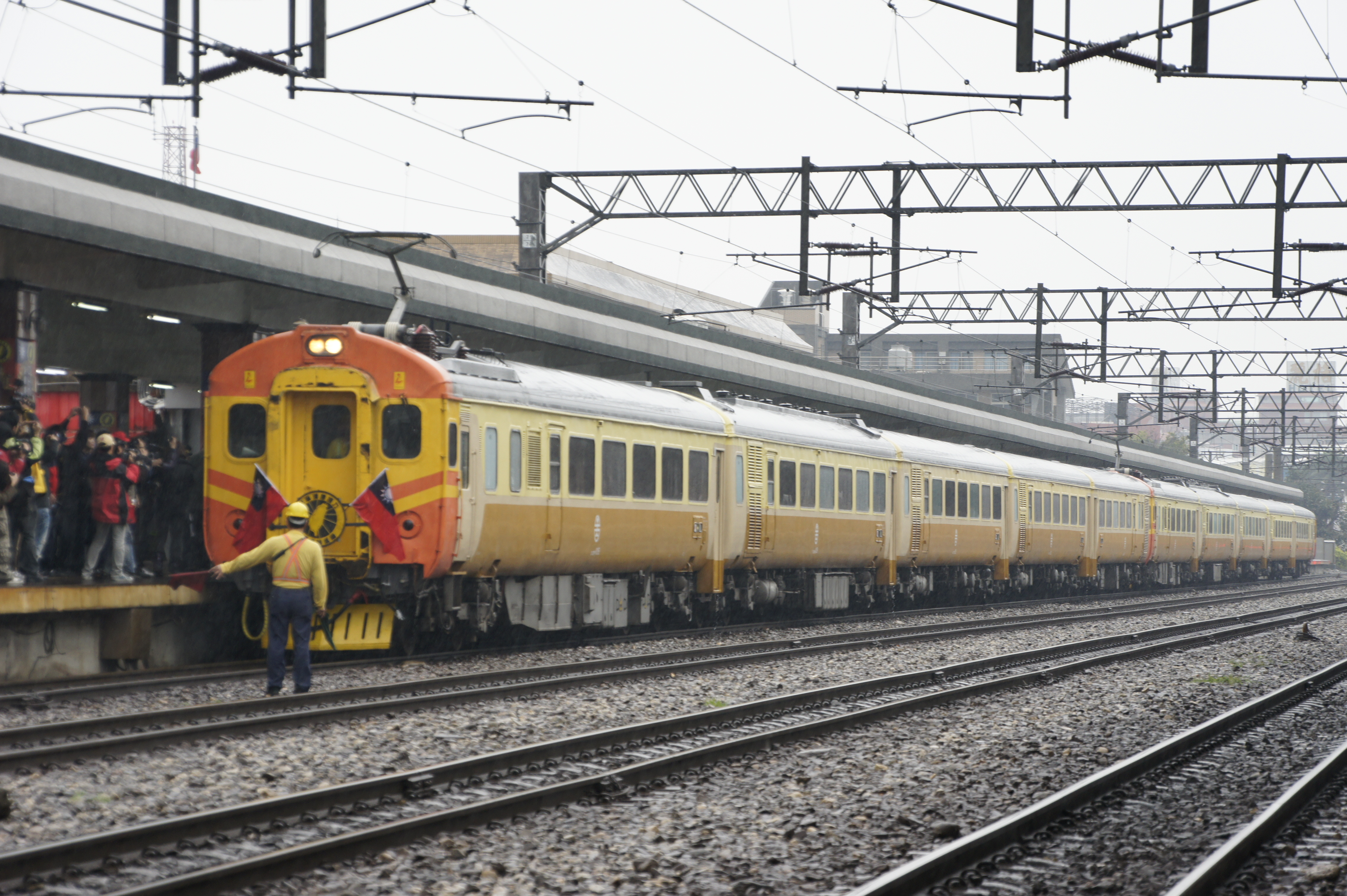
EMU100 Railtour at Hualien Station
