= EMU100 series =

Former passenger train in Taiwan

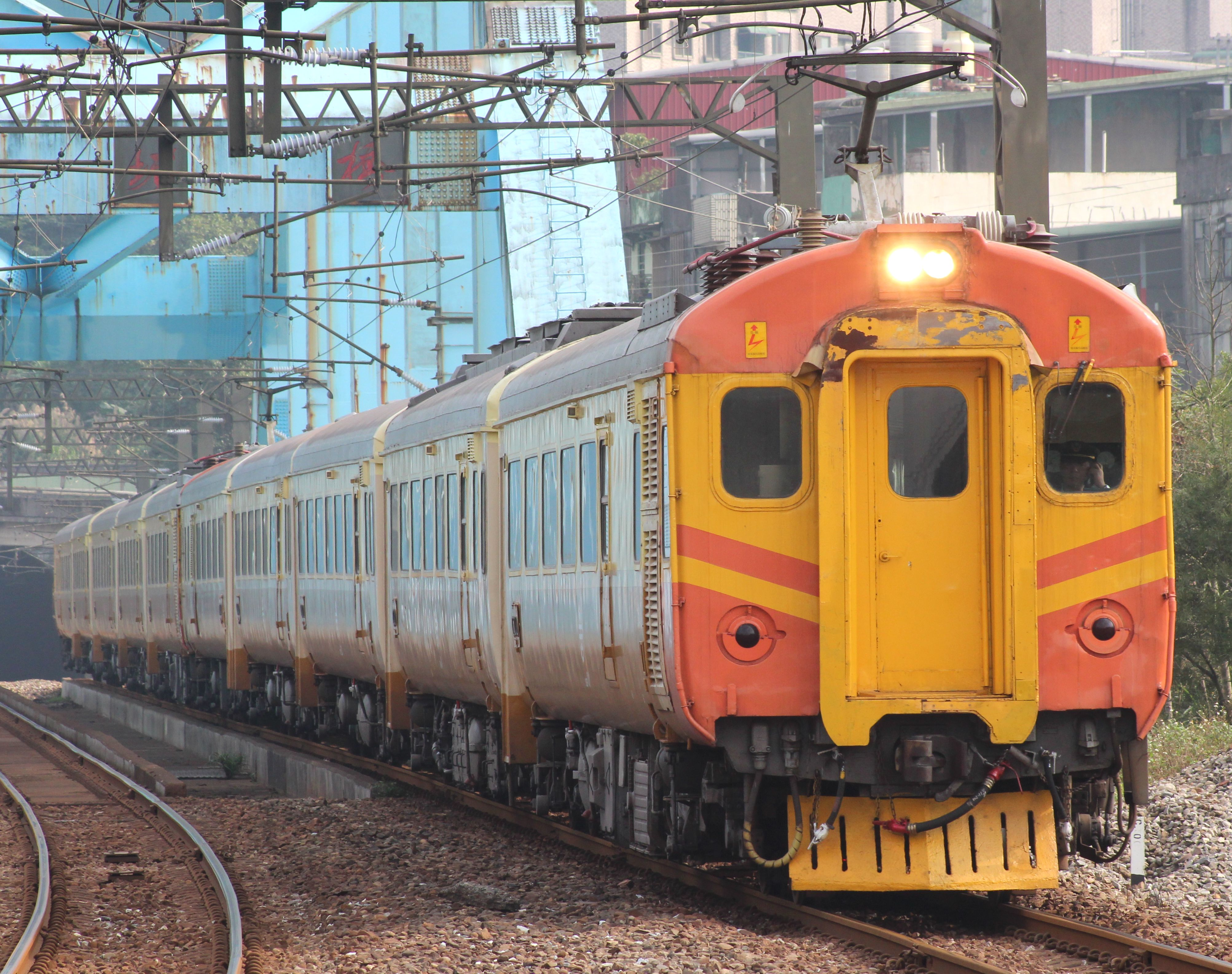
- EMU100 Tzu-Chiang Express at Badu station
- In service: 1978–2009
- Manufacturers: British Rail Engineering Limited; GEC
- Family name: British Rail Mark 2
- Constructed: 1977
- Number built: 13 sets
- Formation: 5 cars per set
- Capacity: 236 seats
- Operator: Taiwan Railways Administration

Specifications
- Car length: 20.09 m (65 ft 11 in)
- Width: 2.802 m (9 ft 2 3/8 in)
- Height: 3.8 m (12 ft 5 5/8 in)
- Maximum speed: 120 km/h (75 mph)
- Power output: 1,275 kW (1,710 hp)
- Electric system: 25 kV 60 Hz Overhead
- Bogies: BREL B.R BX1
- Braking systems: WABCO Electro-Pneumatic, rheostatic brake
- Track gauge: 1,067 mm (3 ft 6 in)

The Taiwan Railway EMU100 series was a set of rail cars fabricated by British Rail Engineering Limited and the General Electric Company in 1976 that has operated in Taiwan. The alternating current electric multiple unit (EMU) fleet entered full squadron service in 1979, and was withdrawn from service in 2009. This class of railcars were the first to operate on the electric Tzu-Chiang Express. Due to the unit's British origin, rail buffs have variously nicknamed them "British Girl", "British Lady", or "British Grandma" (Chinese: 英國阿婆; pinyin: Yīngguó āpó).

== Background ==
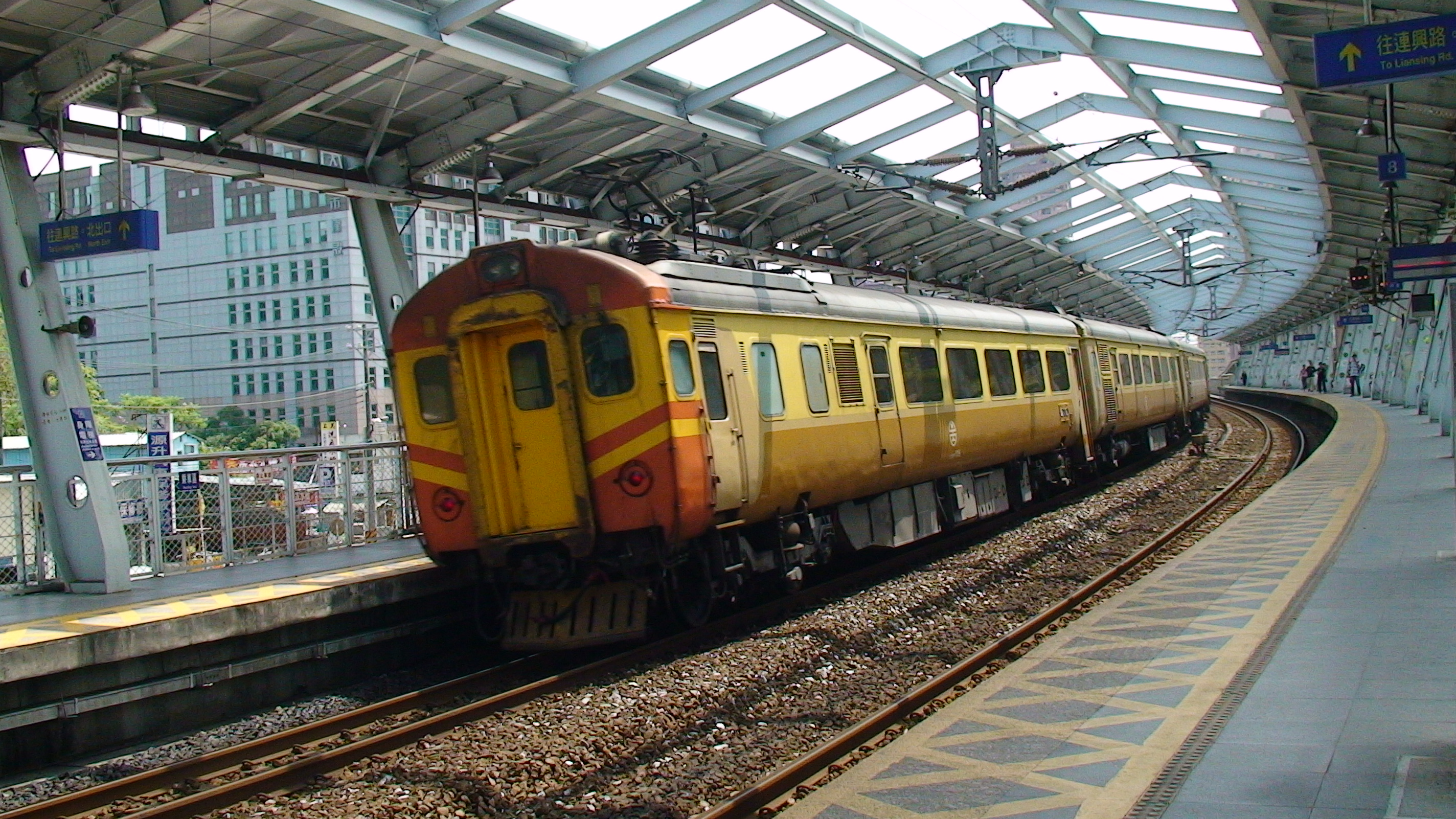
EMU100 series train at the Xike Science Park station on the elevated section of the track in New Taipei City

In the early 1970s, the West Coast Mainline Electrification Scheme was already planned. Taiwan Railways had ordered 13 five-car electric multiple unit sets from England's British Rail Engineering Limited (BREL) and General Electric Company. Identified as the Taiwan Railways EMU100 series, the set included driving power coach 50EP100, motor coach 55EM100, two trailers 40ET100, and driving trailer 40ED100. Based on the British Rail Mark 2 design, they were built at British Rail Engineering Limited's York Carriage Works in 1977/78. Throughout 1978 the sets were delivered to Taiwan for testing and acceptance.

Although full service was inaugurated on 15 August 1978, within a month the EMU100 units had been temporarily sidelined due to air conditioning trouble and various component issues. The 50-ton motor power coach (50EP100), which contained the 25 kV AC main transformer, was too heavy and caused bogie suspension stress issues, and was a safety concern when operating at high speeds. After four month of intensive troubleshooting involving TRA Mechanical section and the original equipment manufacturers, the vehicles were re-launched on 2 January 1979 in revenue passenger service. It was not until 1 July 1979, when the West Coast Mainline Electrification Project had reached substantial completion throughout its entire project length, that Tzu-Chiang was able to reach its full potential of operating at 120 km/h (75 mph). Taking 4 hours and 10 minutes between Taipei and Kaohsiung, the EMU100 broke prior service speed records set by the White Steel Train DR2700 diesel multiple unit operating as the Kuang-Hwa Express, and became TRA's newest-generation premier express.

After 30 years of service, the EMU100 series was withdrawn from regular commercial service in 2009. It has been used on special occasions since.

== Specifications and Construction ==
=== Trainsets ===
The EMU100 type were marshalled in units of five cars, and the motor to trailer ratio is 1M4T. Typically, two sets were coupled to form a train consisting of ten cars. During the new lunar year holiday period and other times of peak travel demand, EMU100 could be worked as a consist of three units (total of 15 coaches) per train. The vehicle formation was normally as follows: Driving Power Car (EP100 type), Motor Car (EM100 type), two Trailer Cars (ET100 type), and Driving Trailer Car (ED100 type). The traction motors are only equipped on the EM100 type, but it receives its power from the adjacent EP100 car. The ED100-end is normally considered the "front end", with the EP100 end being the "rear end". However, as it is a multiple unit trainset with cabs at both ends, there is no important distinction between front and rear in normal operations.

The EMU100 was the only distributed power unit in Taiwan Railways that were formed in five car sets. Other EMUs utilized for Tzu Chiang Tokkyu (such as the EMU200 and EMU300 were formed of three car sets, and the commuter EMUs (like EMU400 series) were formed of four car sets. This motor-to-trailer ratio of 1M4T historically was a challenge on the old alignment of the Taiwan West Coast Mainline.

=== Carbody ===
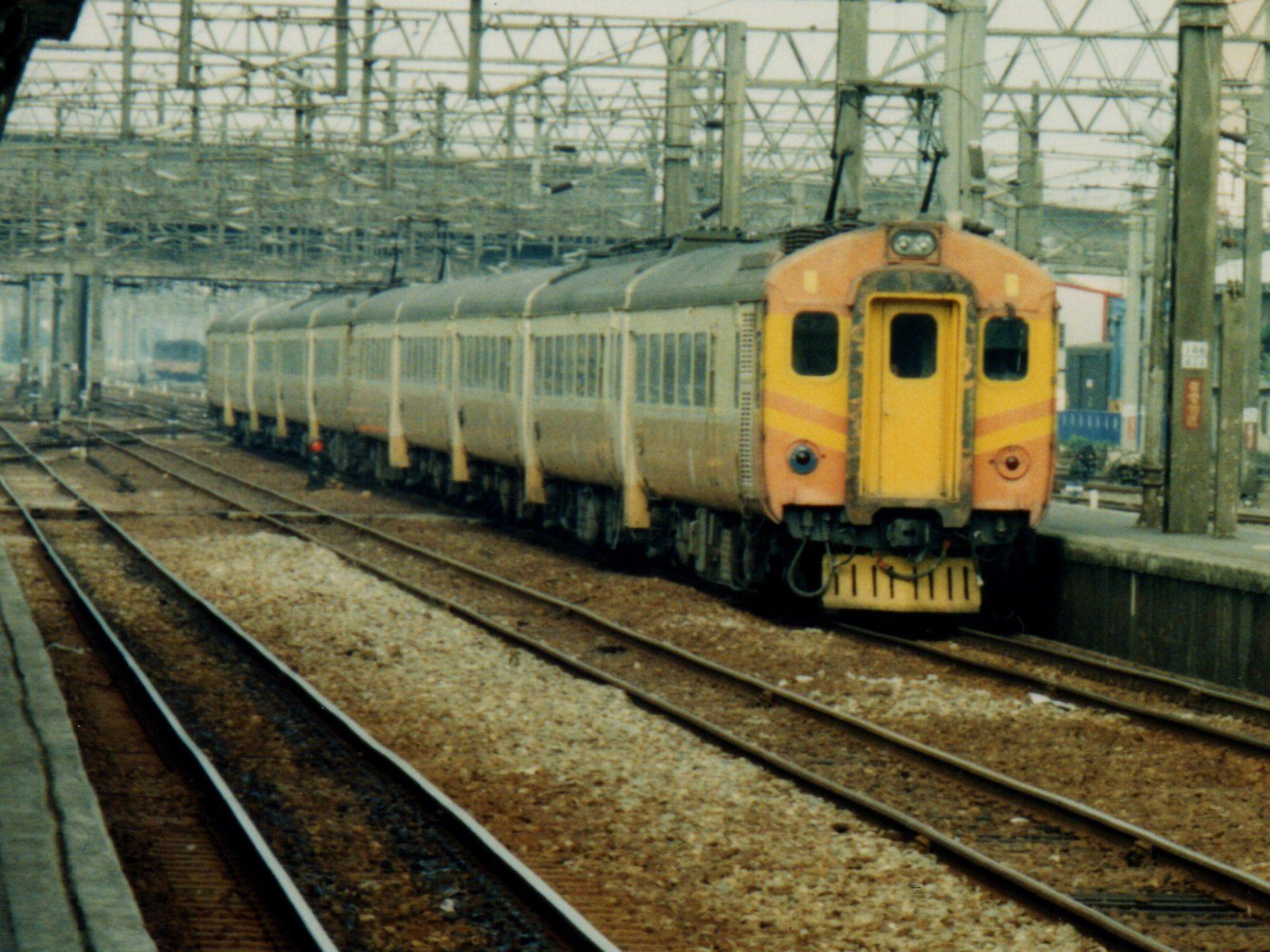
Northbound EMU100 in Hsinchu Station in 1997

The car body of EMU100 is made of carbon steel, and the appearance of the car body adopts the arc design of the British Rail Mk.II intercity train. The vehicle was livered with British Standard colours: CREAM (colour code BS 381C-352), LIGHT STONE (colour code BS 381C-361) and KASHMIR (colour code BS 4800 08 C37) in a "dumbbell" or "dogbone" design (see vehicle side profile). After the occurrence of Touqianxi level-crossing accident, Taiwan Railway changed the front of the car to orange and yellow warning colours (locally known as "owl colours") to remind pedestrians and vehicles ahead to pay attention and not to attempt to cross tracks when the crossing lights are activated. Later, the EMU200 and EMU300 continued to use the same general livery scheme. For a special event on August 15, 2009, Taiwan Railways restored two EMU100 trainsets to their original livery.

Each car was provided with one set of doors, using manual folding doors. To evacuate passengers in the event of an emergency, EMU100 was also equipped with an emergency exit door on each side of the front end of the passenger compartment. The air conditioning system was installed next to the passage on the end face of one side of the coach. Due to the long dwell time from passengers getting on and off the train with a single door and the large amount of space occupied by the floor-mounted integral air-conditioning unit, all types of electric trains introduced by Taiwan Railway subsequently have had modular air-conditioning installed on the roof. EMU100 became the only EMU train in Taiwan Railways with integral air conditioners units installed at the end of the carriage, a design that was traditional to Taiwan Railway's hauled coaching stock of that period.

=== Passenger Cabin ===
The reclining seats were made by the French company La Compagnie, with a 2+2 seat configuration per row, the seat pitch was 1,150 mm (45 in), and the seat angle and rotation could be adjusted by the user. After later general overhauls and modifications, the seat covers were gradually changed to a blue velvet fabric. There was an attendant call light above the seat, which was designed for calling a service attendant back when they were assigned to train service. With the rationalization of the on-board service personnel on the Taiwan Railway, the call light feature was disabled and taken out of use.

Later, on July 6, 1991, Taiwan Railway tried to launch a business class service similar to Japan's Green Car, and selected 3 ET100-type trailers for conversion to wider seats, and adopted a seat configuration of 2+1 per row. A public telephone was also installed at the same time. The ticket rate was set at 2.68 yuan per kilometer (the comparable rate for Tzu Chiang Tokkyu was 1.89 yuan per km at that time). As a special promotion, the fare from Taipei to Kaohsiung was set at 999 yuan. However, due to poor operational performance (it was not well-patronized), the business class trial service was terminated on March 31, 1992 and the ET100 vehicles were converted back to the original configuration.

The various Tzu Chiang Tokkyu trains purchased by the Taiwan Railways subsequent to the EMU100 were not generally regarded as quite as comfortable or luxurious as the EMU100. At that time, Taiwan Railway was in the process of slowly metamorphosing from a premium intercity service to mass transportation.

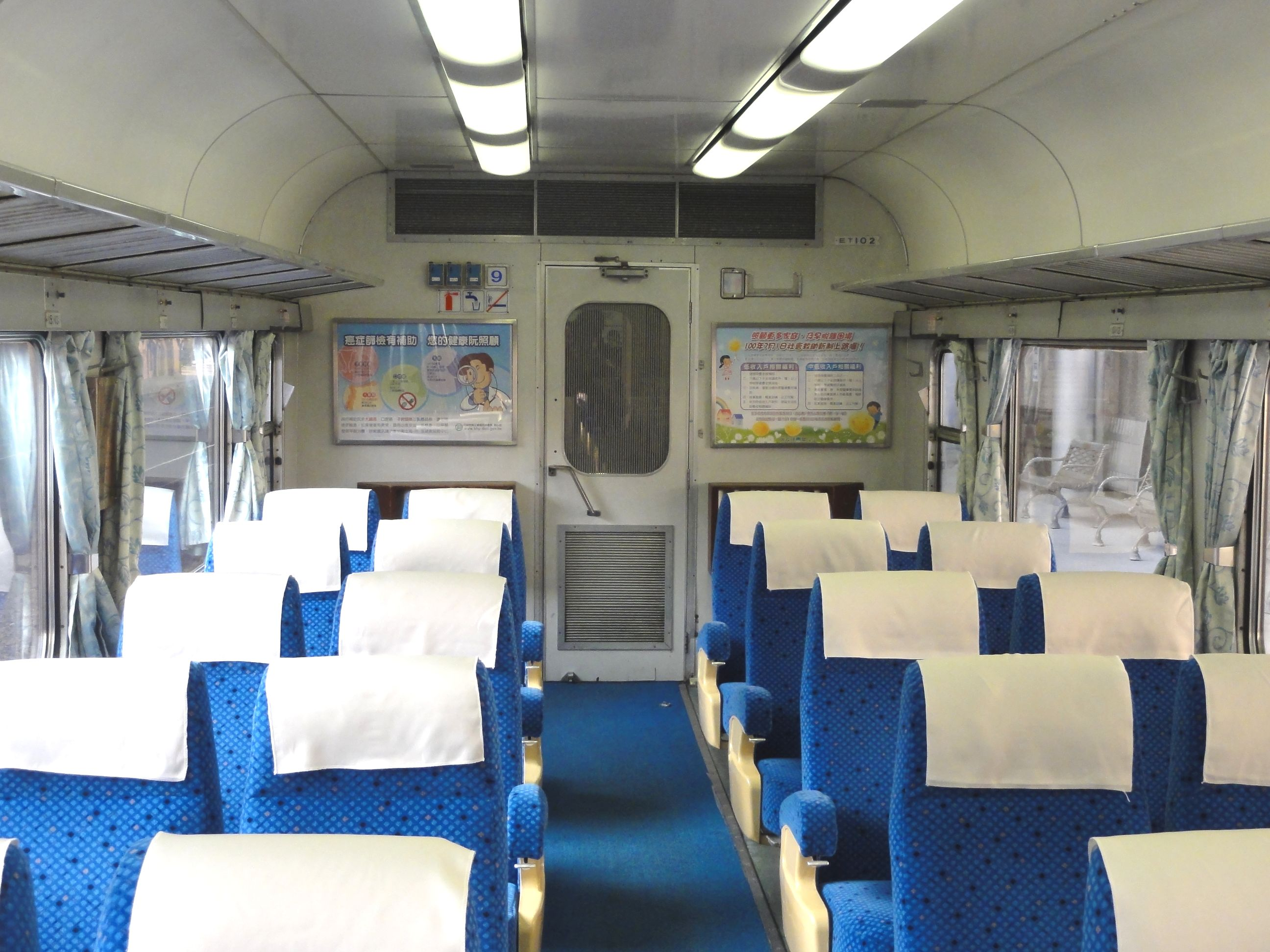
Passenger cabin interior

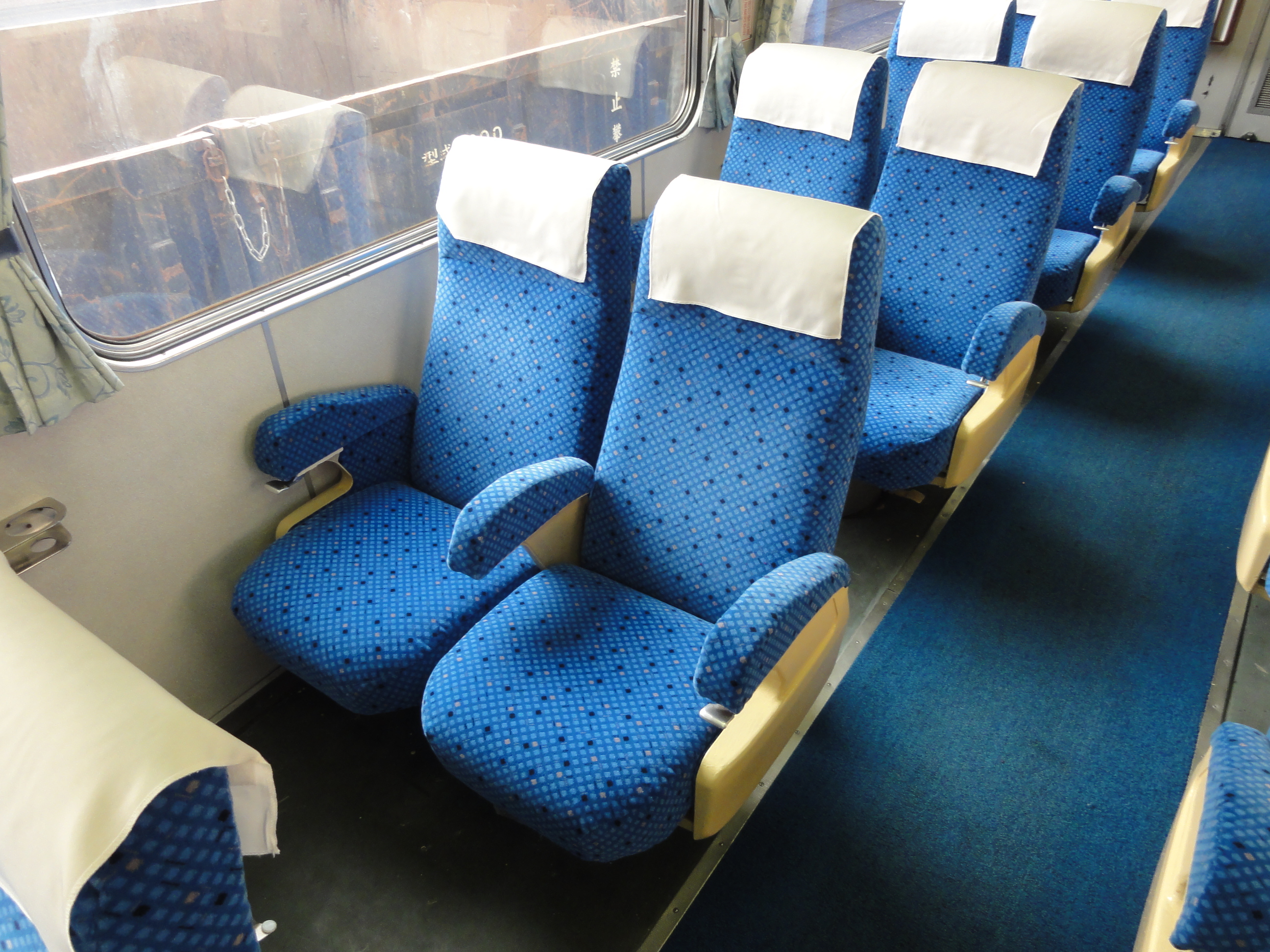
Production seat (post-overhaul)

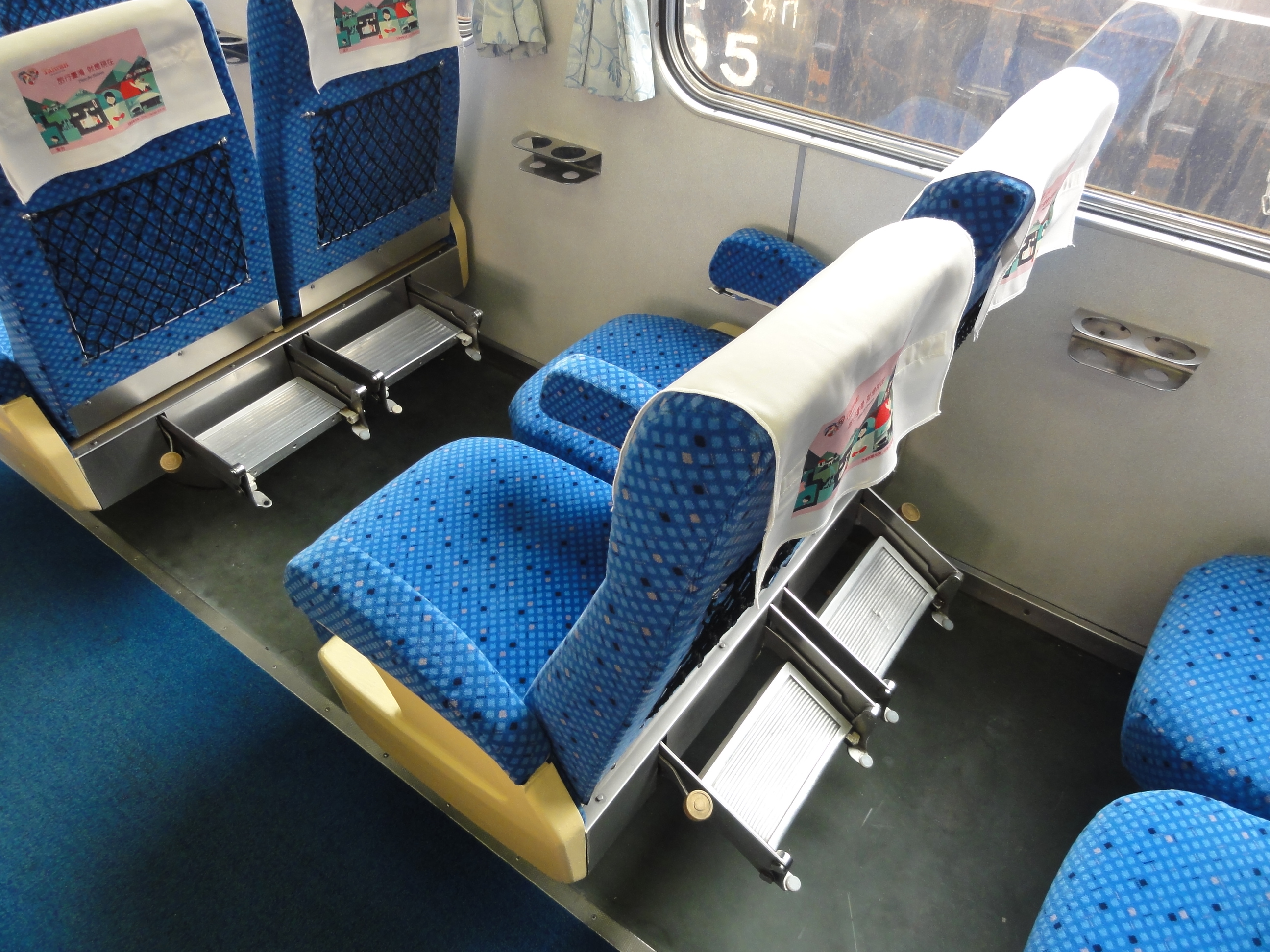
Back of the seats, with footstep

=== Traction Equipment ===
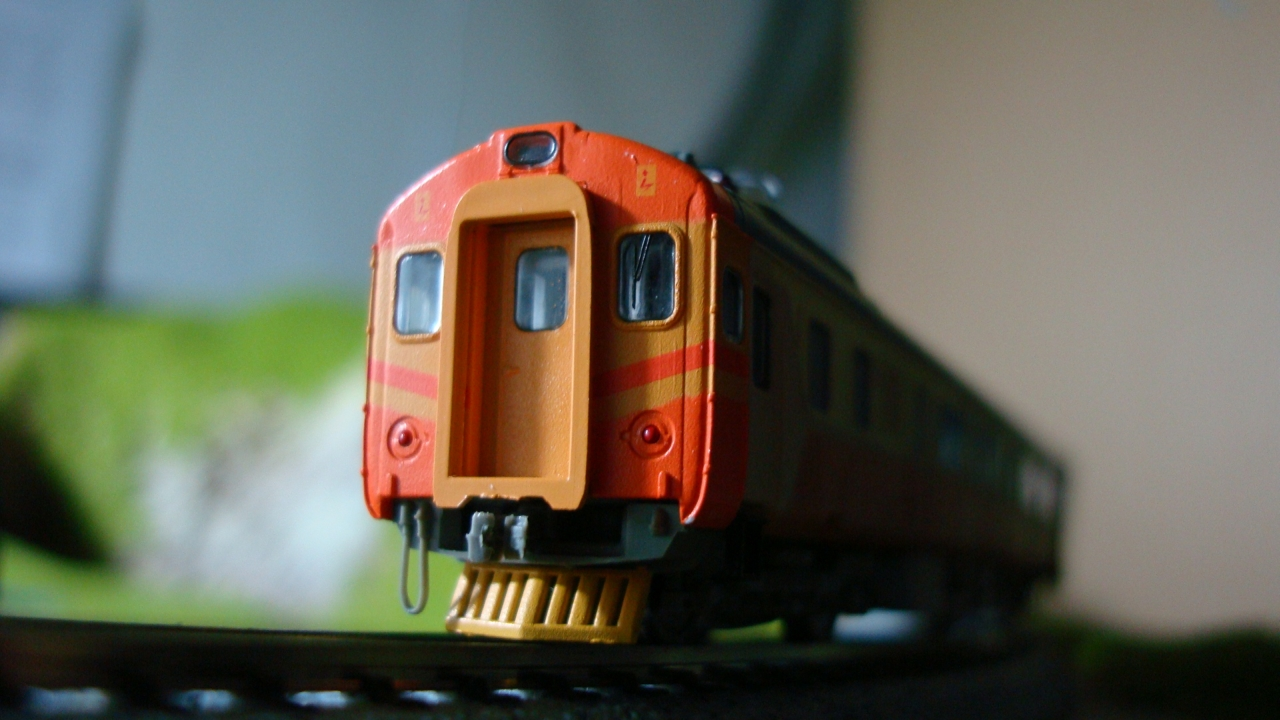
EMU100 N-Scale Rail Model

The traction and transformer/power train equipment of EMU100 was manufactured by British General Electric Company (GEC). The four traction motors on the EM100 car provided a total power output of 1,275 kW (1,710 hp). Due to challenging terrain or traction equipment failure, EMU100 in later years often needed to be pushed by auxiliary pusher locomotives. Later, when the EMU200 series and EMU300 were introduced, this issue was taken into account in the design and it was changed to a 2M1T configuration. The electric train supply (hotel power) was provided by an onboard motor alternator set (MA-set) on the EP100 car, which provided the power required for the air conditioners and lights. The cross-arm type (diamond-shaped) pantograph made by AEI (Associated Electrical Industries) was used at the time of introduction. Due to the difficulty of maintenance, it was gradually changed to single-arm type pantograph since the year 2000.

=== Bogies and Brakes ===
The EMU100 utilizes the BR BX1 bogie manufactured by British Rail Engineering Limited (BREL). The first layer of suspension adopts the British Chevron Rubber Spring, and the second layer of suspension is the air spring. To prevent vehicle sway and bogie hunting, the bogies are equipped with sway dampers. The EMU100 is fitted with an electro-pneumatic braking (EPB) system manufactured by the Westinghouse Air Brake Company (WABCO). The EBP works in conjunction with rheostatic braking provided by the traction motors in a blended configuration.

=== Train Control Devices ===
When the EMU100 railway safety device was first introduced, it was equipped with Automatic Train Alerting Device (AWS) and Automatic Train Stopping Device (ATS-SN and ATS-P). In 2006, the automatic train protection system (ATP) made by Bombardier was introduced, equivalent to European Rail Traffic Management System Level 1 Specification (Note: European Rail Traffic Management System (English: European Rail Traffic Management System)) referred to as 'ERTMS' is the European railway security device which incorporates the European Train Control System (ETCS). The mobile wireless radio (cab to shore radio) was installed at the same time, and the original automatic train stop devices were removed.

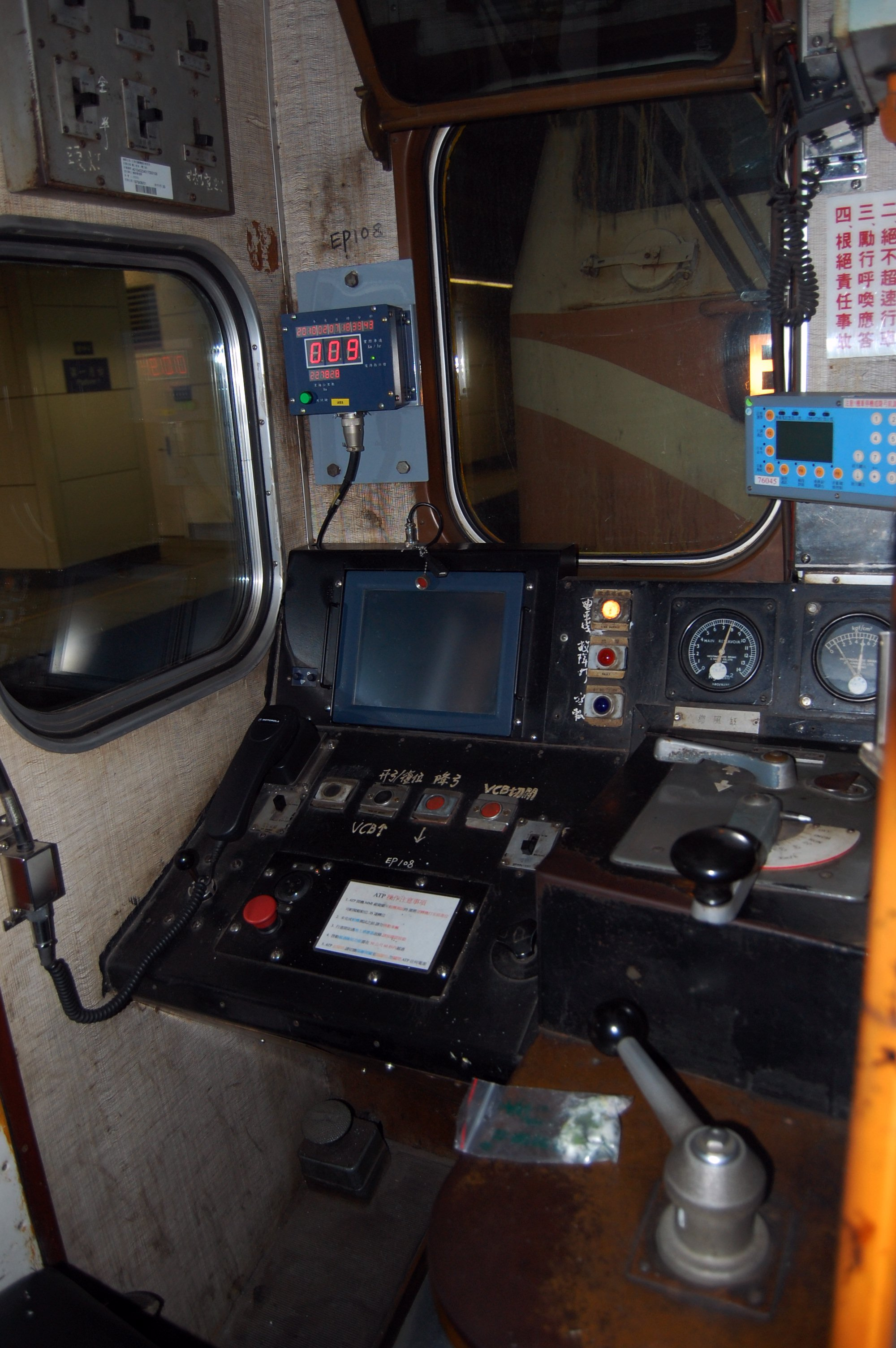
EMU100 Ziqiang Electric Combined Vehicle EP108 Driving Electric Vehicle Cab

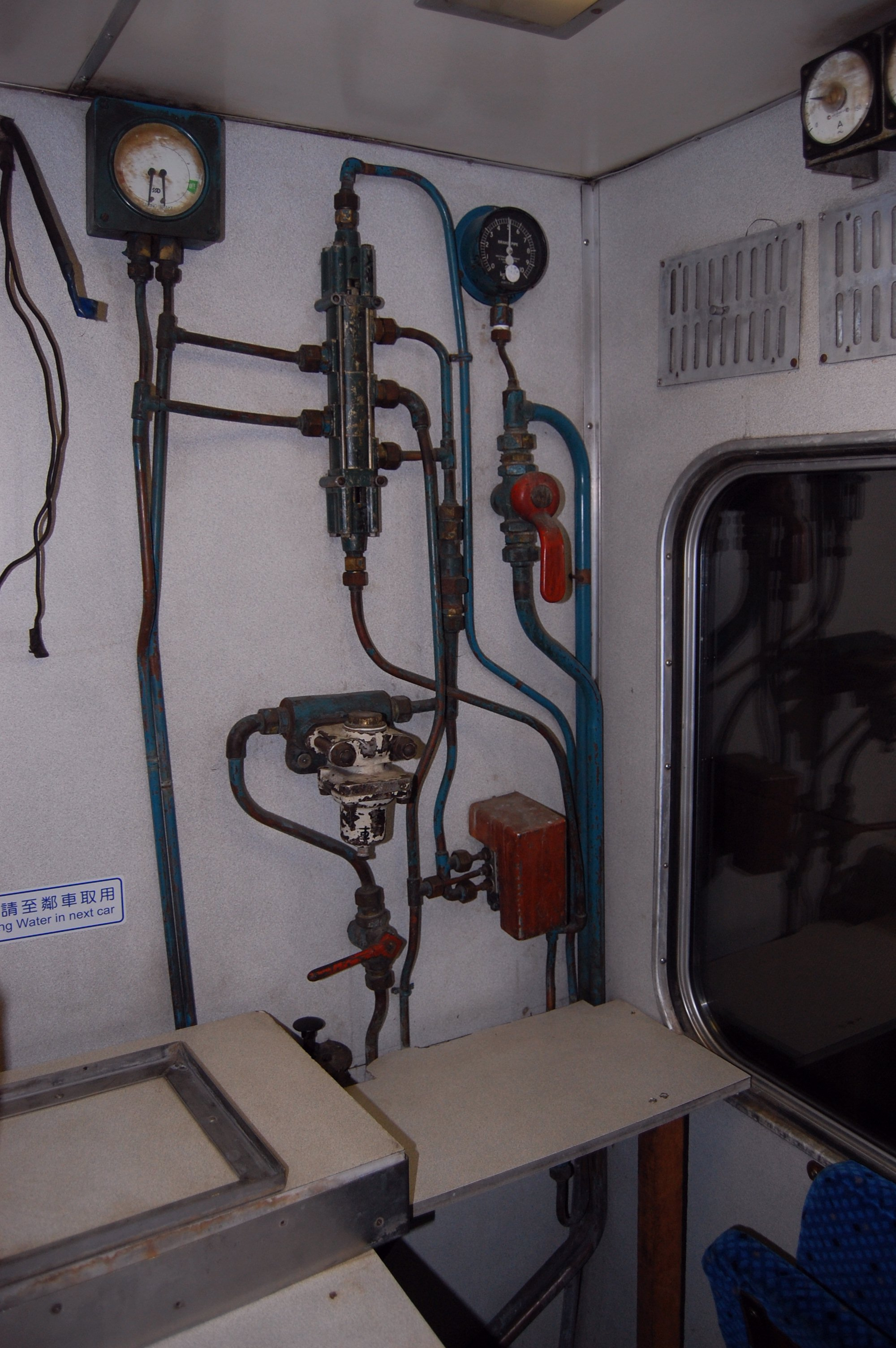
EP101 Brake Equipment Detail

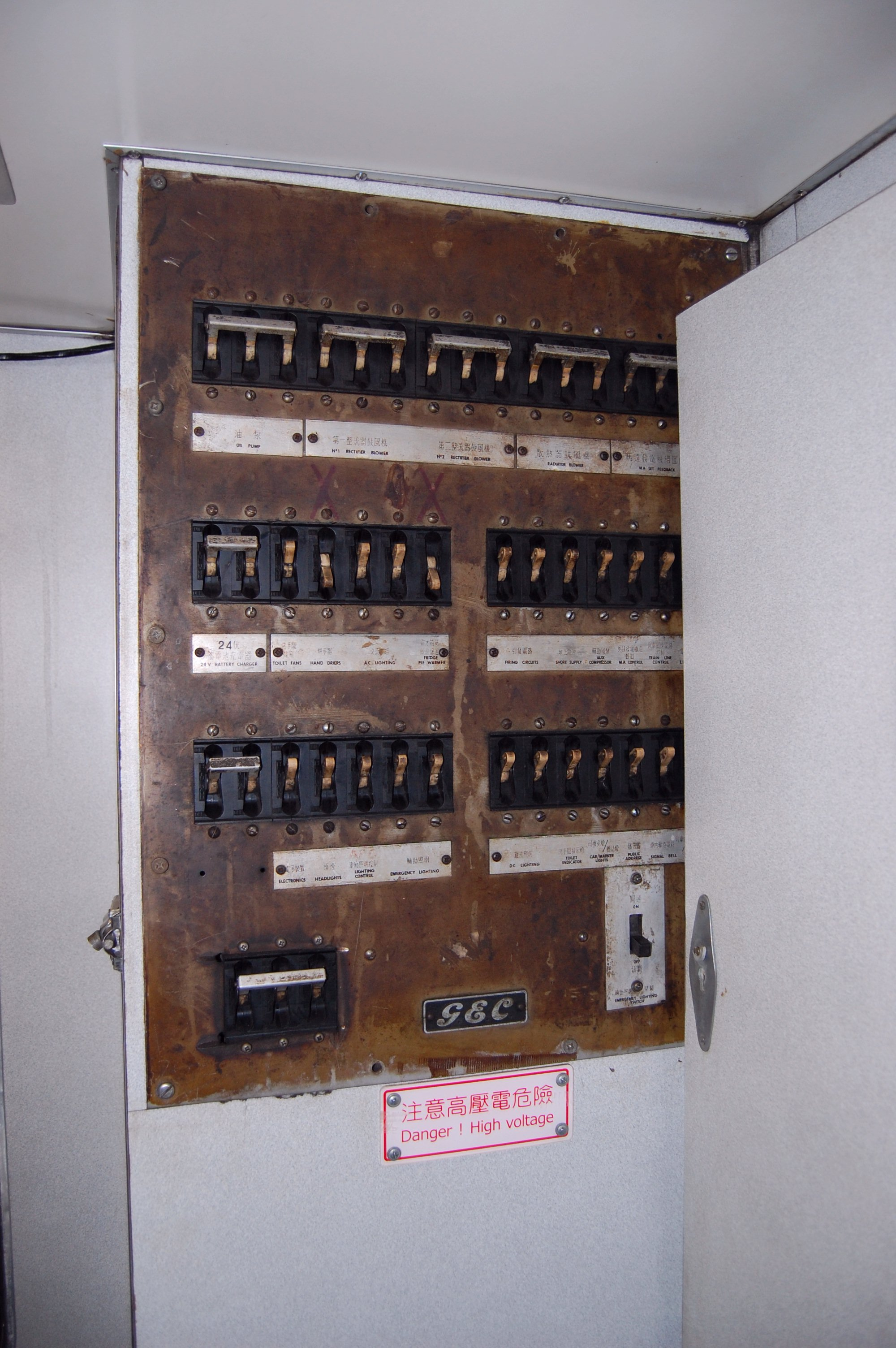
Low Voltage GEC (General Electric Company) Breaker Panel for EP101 Car

=== Unusual Vehicle Consists ===
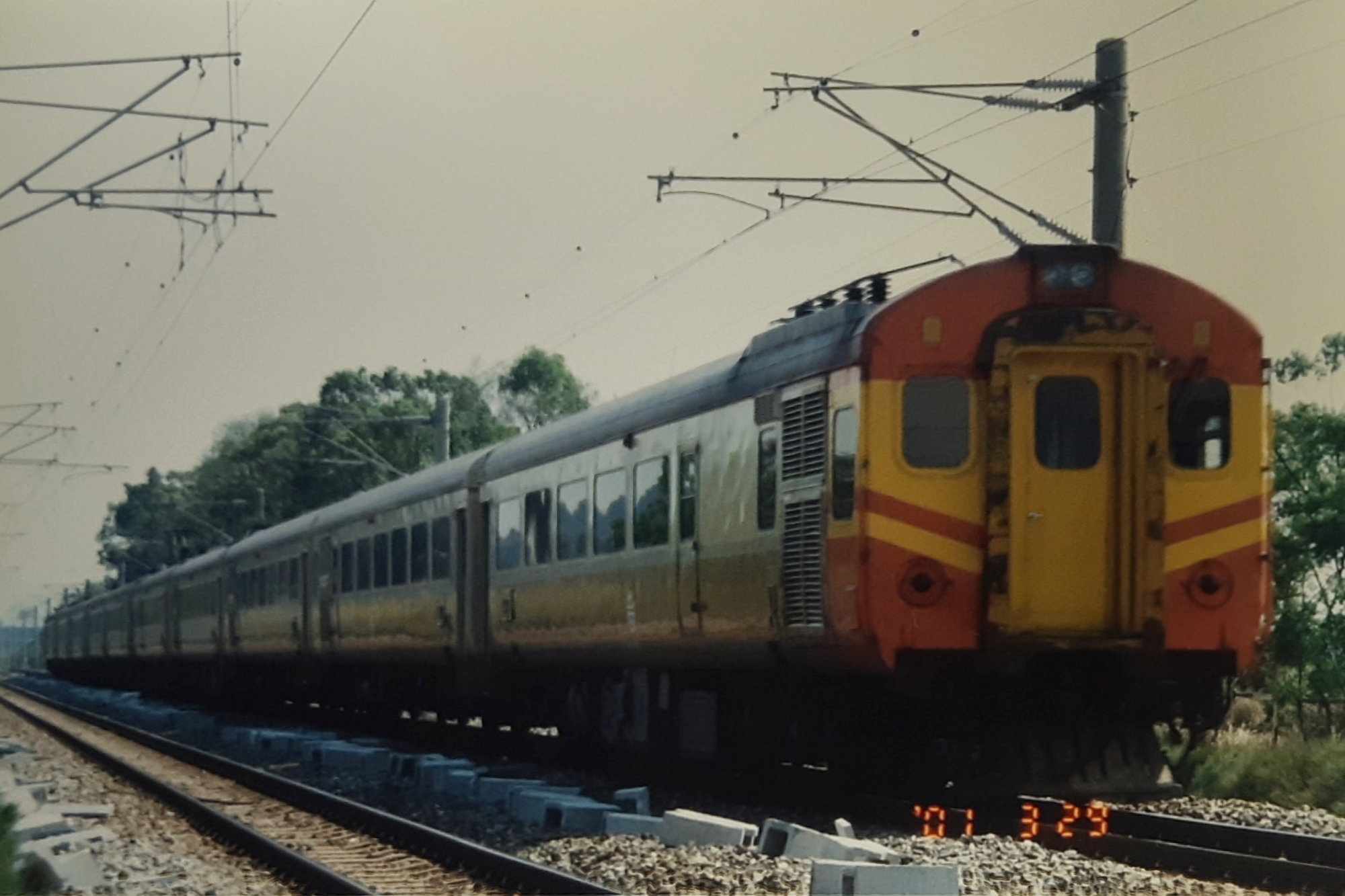
The front-end vehicle in the photo is No. 50EPD112, which was used for the removal of the pantograph from No. 50EP112 to the ED vehicle

For one EP100-type vehicle, the EP112, because several of the ED100-type was written-off after level crossing accidents, the pantograph of EP112 was removed and the number was changed to 50EPD112, allowing EPD112 to be marshalled in place of one of the scrapped ED100-type trailers. In 2009, in order to commemorate EMU100 being withdrawn from the regular service, the four cars 50EP108, 50EP111, 40ED105, and 40ED106 were painted with the original livery, without the "owl" warning stripes.
