= Puyuma Express =

Passenger train service in Taiwan

TEMU2000 series "Puyuma Express"
- Puyuma Express set 16 (TEMU2031/2032) near Xizhi
- In service: 2013–present
- Manufacturer: Nippon Sharyo
- Family name: Tze-chiang limited express (service)
- Constructed: 2012–2015
- Number built: 152 vehicles (19 sets)
- Number in service: 144 vehicles (18 sets)
- Number retired: 1 set (TEMU2007/2008)
- Formation: 8 cars per trainset
- Fleet numbers: TEMU2001–TEMU2038
- Operators: Taiwan Railway Corporation

Specifications
- Car body construction: Aluminium
- Train length: 168.39 m (552 ft 5 1/2 in)
- Car length: 22,095 mm (72 ft 5 7/8 in) (TED); 20.7 m (67 ft 10 15/16 in) (others)
- Width: 2.9 m (9 ft 6 3/16 in)
- Height: 4.17 m (13 ft 8 3/16 in) (TEP); 4.05 m (13 ft 3 7/16 in) (others)
- Doors: 4 per car, 2 more for drivers
- Wheel diameter: 860–780 mm (34–31 in) (new–worn)
- Wheelbase: 2.2 m (7 ft 3 in)
- Maximum speed: 150 km/h (93 mph) (design); 130 km/h (81 mph) (service)
- Weight: 316.92 t (311.91 long tons; 349.34 short tons)
- Traction system: Toshiba COV098-A0 IGBT–C/I
- Traction motors: 16 × Toshiba SEA-431 220 kW (300 hp) asynchronous 3-phase AC
- Power output: 3.52 MW (4,720 hp)
- Tractive effort: 28,000 kgf (270 kN)
- Acceleration: 0.51 m/s^{2} (1.7 ft/s^{2}) (0–50 km/h (0–31 mph)); 0.33 m/s^{2} (1.1 ft/s^{2}) (50–130 km/h (31–81 mph))
- Deceleration: 1 m/s^{2} (3.3 ft/s^{2}) (service); 1.2 m/s^{2} (3.9 ft/s^{2}) (emergency)
- Electric system(s): 25 kV 60 Hz AC (nominal) from overhead catenary
- Current collection: Pantograph
- UIC classification: 2′2′+Bo′Bo′+2′2′+Bo′Bo′+Bo′Bo′+2′2′+Bo′Bo′+2′2′
- Bogies: ND-742
- Track gauge: 1,067 mm (3 ft 6 in)

Notes/references
- Sourced from except where noted

The Puyuma Express (Chinese: 普悠瑪號; pinyin: Pǔyōumǎ Hào) is a type of railway service on Taiwan Railway Corporation (TR) notable for using tilting trains. It began commercial service on 6 February 2013 during the Spring Festival.

Puyuma Express was commissioned by the then Taiwan Railways Administration (TRA) in order to upgrade the Taiwanese rail system. As the mountains of Taiwan are a barrier to coast-to-coast transportation, motor travel is prone to congestion. The high speed and capacity of the service helps to alleviate this problem. Puyuma Express also increases passenger capacity on TR. The maximum operational speed of Puyuma Express is 150 km/h (93 mph), making it the fastest service of TR. Puyuma Express belongs to the Tze-chiang limited express class of TRA services in terms of fares; however, it is a reservation-only service similar to the Taroko Express, with no standing passengers allowed.

== Naming ==
The name "Puyuma" means "together" and "united" in the Puyuma language spoken by the Puyuma people of eastern Taiwan. It was chosen after a naming contest that was open to the public.

== History ==
The trains were imported to Taiwan in 2012; since 2013, they have been running between Hualien and Taipei, on the existing narrow gauge tracks of the winding Yilan line, where they reduced traveling time between the two cities from 3 hours down to about 2 hours. On 28 February 2013, the TRA announced that Taitung would become a destination on the Puyuma Express with official operations beginning 16 July 2014, in concord with the completion of electrification of the Taitung Line.

== Rolling stock ==
Puyuma Express services use TEMU2000 series tilting EMUs purpose-built by Nippon Sharyo. TRA purchased a total of 152 TEMU2000 cars for 19 trains. The first 16 cars arrived on 25 October 2012.

== Fatal incidents ==
- On 21 October 2018, Puyuma Express set 4 derailed in Yilan County at about 16:50 local time, killing at least 18 people and injuring 187. The cause of this incident was an excessive speed, combined with an inactive automatic train stop.

== See also ==
- Taroko Express
- Media related to TRA TEMU2000 at Wikimedia Commons
