= DR3100 series =

Diesel multiple unit operated by Taiwan Railways

TRA DR3100 Diesel Multiple Unit
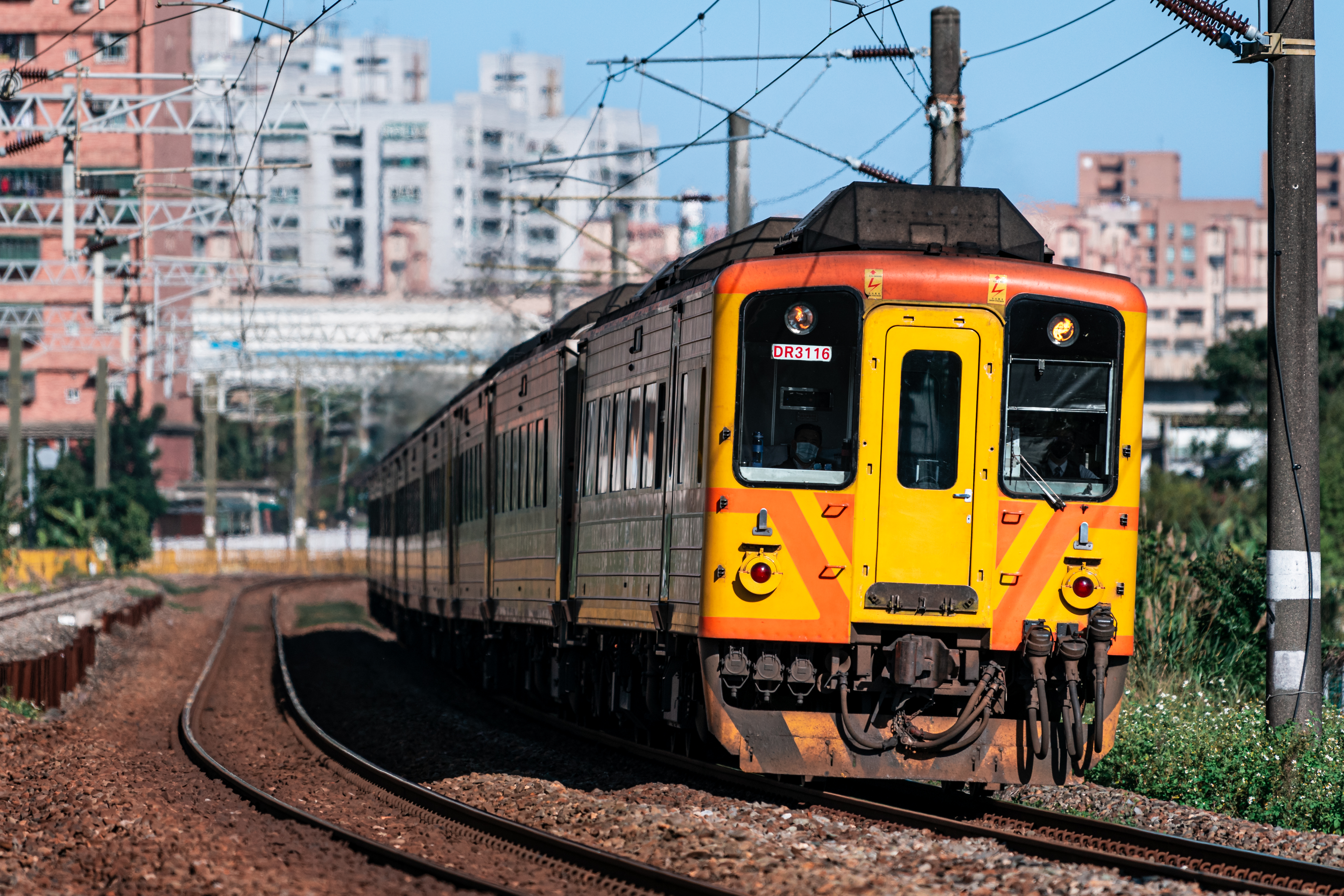
- A DR3100 diesel multiple unit between Taoyuan Station and Neilichjunction Station on the Western Line (photographed in 2023)
- Stock type: Diesel multiple unit, intercity train
- Manufacturers: Nippon Sharyo; Tang Eng Iron Works
- Assembly: Japan; Taiwan
- Entered service: 1 August 1998 (28 years, 76 days)
- Number in service: 10 sets of 30 cars
- Formation: DR3100 + DR3150 + DR3100
- Fleet numbers: 45DR3101–45DR3120; 45DR3151–45DR3160
- Operators: Taiwan Railways Administration; Taiwan Railways Corporation

Specifications
- Car body construction: SUS301L stainless steel
- Car length: 20,274 mm
- Width: 2,885 mm
- Height: 4,070 mm
- Doors: Two plug-type automatic sliding doors per side
- Maximum speed: 110 km/h
- Weight: DR3100: 45 t DR3150: 40 t
- Prime movers: Before modification: Cummins NTA855-R1 (power cars); After modification: Cummins N14-R4 (power cars); Generator trailer: Cummins NT855-R4
- Acceleration: 0.5 km/h/s
- Deceleration: 3.0 km/h/s (service)
- Bogies: Air spring bogies DR3100: ND–727; DR3150: ND–727T
- Braking system: Electromagnetic straight-air brake (SMEE type)
- Safety systems: ATC, ATP
- Seating: DR3100 (odd-numbered cars): 44; DR3100 (even-numbered cars): 46; DR3150: 52
- Track gauge: 1,067 mm

Notes/references
- Maximum of 5 sets (15 cars) in multiple-unit operation

The DR3100 Diesel Multiple Unit is an air-conditioned diesel passenger train introduced by the Taiwan Railways Administration in 1998. It is Taiwan Railways' fourth diesel passenger train equipped with air-conditioning, and the first diesel intercity train to be delivered new with automatic doors, manufactured by Nippon Sharyo and Tang Eng Iron Works. Although the eastern main line Tzu-Chiang Express service already had the DR2800, DR2900, and DR3000 diesel multiple units in operation in the late 1990s, tickets on holidays were still extremely difficult to obtain; the DR3100 was procured to relieve travel demand on the line before electrification was completed. On 23 December 2020, the electrification of the South-Link Line was fully completed, leaving no non-electrified sections on Taiwan's round-island railway main lines. Combined with the successive deliveries of the new EMU3000 electric multiple units from 2021 onward, the need for diesel Tzu-Chiang Express trains diminished. However, as this type had not yet reached the end of its service life, it continued to operate, while all other diesel Tzu-Chiang Express units were retired after the timetable revision of 26 April 2023. On 1 January 2024, Taiwan Railways Administration was corporatised, and the DR3100 became a vehicle under the newly established Taiwan Railways Corporation, continuing in service.

== History ==
=== Introduction ===
Among Taiwan's Ten Major Construction Projects of the 1970s, the construction of the North-Link Line was one of the major railway projects of the era, connecting Nanshenghu Station (Note: Now Su'ao New Station.) on the Yilan Line with Hualien Station, and officially opening in February 1980. Subsequently, in July 1982, the Taitung Line completed its gauge conversion from 762 mm to 1,067 mm, and together the Yilan Line, North-Link Line, and Taitung Line formed the main railway corridor for eastern Taiwan.

By the early 1990s, the existing DR2800 and DR2900 series were no longer sufficient to meet the steadily growing travel demand on the eastern main line. With the South-Link Line about to open, the need for additional rolling stock became even more pressing, and Taiwan Railways procured the DR3000 series from Hitachi, Ltd. of Japan. While this type was able to effectively relieve pressure on weekdays, tickets on holidays remained extremely scarce.

Although electrification of the North-Link Line had already begun in 1992, with plans to introduce electric trains in the future to improve efficiency, in order to fill the short-term capacity gap before electrification was completed, Taiwan Railways decided to procure 10 sets, totalling 30 cars, of intercity-type diesel multiple units from Nippon Sharyo. Under a technology transfer arrangement, the first three cars were manufactured by Nippon Sharyo as demonstration units, while the bodies of the remaining 27 cars were manufactured and assembled by Tang Eng Iron Works, (Note: Now Taiwan Rolling Stock Company.) with bogies produced by China Steel Corporation. All deliveries were completed in October 1998, and the type was positioned as a supplementary variant of the DR3000.

This batch of vehicles also represented Taiwan Railways' first procurement of internal combustion passenger cars from Nippon Sharyo in 60 years, since the purchase of the DR2300 series in 1937 during the Japanese colonial period.

=== Operations ===
The DR3100 diesel multiple units entered revenue service in August 1998, operating as Tzu-Chiang Express trains on the eastern main line. Due to their visual similarity to the DR1000 series, they initially triggered public speculation that they might be reassigned to branch line services. Upon introduction, the units were assigned to Hualien Rolling Stock Branch. The operational strategy was not simply to add new services but primarily to replace existing trains then operated by the DR2800 through DR3000 series; the sets released through this vehicle replacement allowed additional services to be strengthened, further improving overall capacity. This helped partially alleviate the situation of extremely scarce tickets on the eastern main line during holidays. In the initial phase of operations, the DR3100 primarily operated services between Banqiao and Shulin, Shulin and Hualien, and Shulin and Taitung, each with one return working. Following the completion of Yilan Line electrification in 2000, the operating range was further extended to the South-Link Line and the Pingtung Line, running as far as Kaohsiung.

In 2013, following the arrival of TRA TEMU2000 electric multiple units at Hualien Motive Power Depot and concerns about insufficient maintenance capacity, the DR3100 was reassigned to Taitung Rolling Stock Branch from 30 January; however, due to poor maintenance conditions, the type returned to Hualien Motive Power Depot on 25 September of the same year. After the electrification of the Hualien–Taitung Railway was completed on 16 July 2014, the services formerly operating from Shulin via the eastern main line to Zuoying were restructured as Hualien–Zuoying and Taitung–Taichung services, and the type temporarily withdrew from Yilan Line operations. In August of the same year, due to the large-scale overhaul of EMU500 units assigned to Hualien Motive Power Depot leaving insufficient rolling stock, one three-car DR3100 set was temporarily deployed to supplement some local stopping services. From late 2018 to mid-2019, the Taitung–Taichung service was temporarily substituted by DR2900 or DR3000 units.

On 23 December 2020, the South-Link Line electrification was completed, marking the full electrification of Taiwan's round-island railway main lines. As EMU3000 electric multiple units were successively delivered from 2021, demand for diesel Tzu-Chiang Express trains gradually declined. Following the replacement of the South-Link Line services by EMU3000 units, and in response to the suspension of multiple reserved-seat services on the Coast Line, from the 29 June 2022 timetable revision the DR3100 was assigned to Hualien–Chaozhou Tzu-Chiang Express services via the Coast Line, marking the first time a diesel multiple unit Tzu-Chiang Express operated on the western main line between Taipei and Kaohsiung. After the major timetable revision of 26 April 2023, the type withdrew from western main line and Yilan Line operations. However, as the DR3100 had not yet reached the end of its service life, it was retained on the eastern main line, while all other diesel Tzu-Chiang Express types were simultaneously retired at the same timetable change. On 1 January 2024, Taiwan Railways Administration was corporatised, and the DR3100 was transferred to Taiwan Railways Corporation, continuing operations.

In May 2025, a landslide blocked the line between Heping and Chongde in Hualien County. Although a single-track emergency restoration was completed on 19 May, the overhead catenary had not yet been repaired. Taiwan Railways therefore deployed the DR3100 to operate temporary shuttle services between Heping and Xincheng.

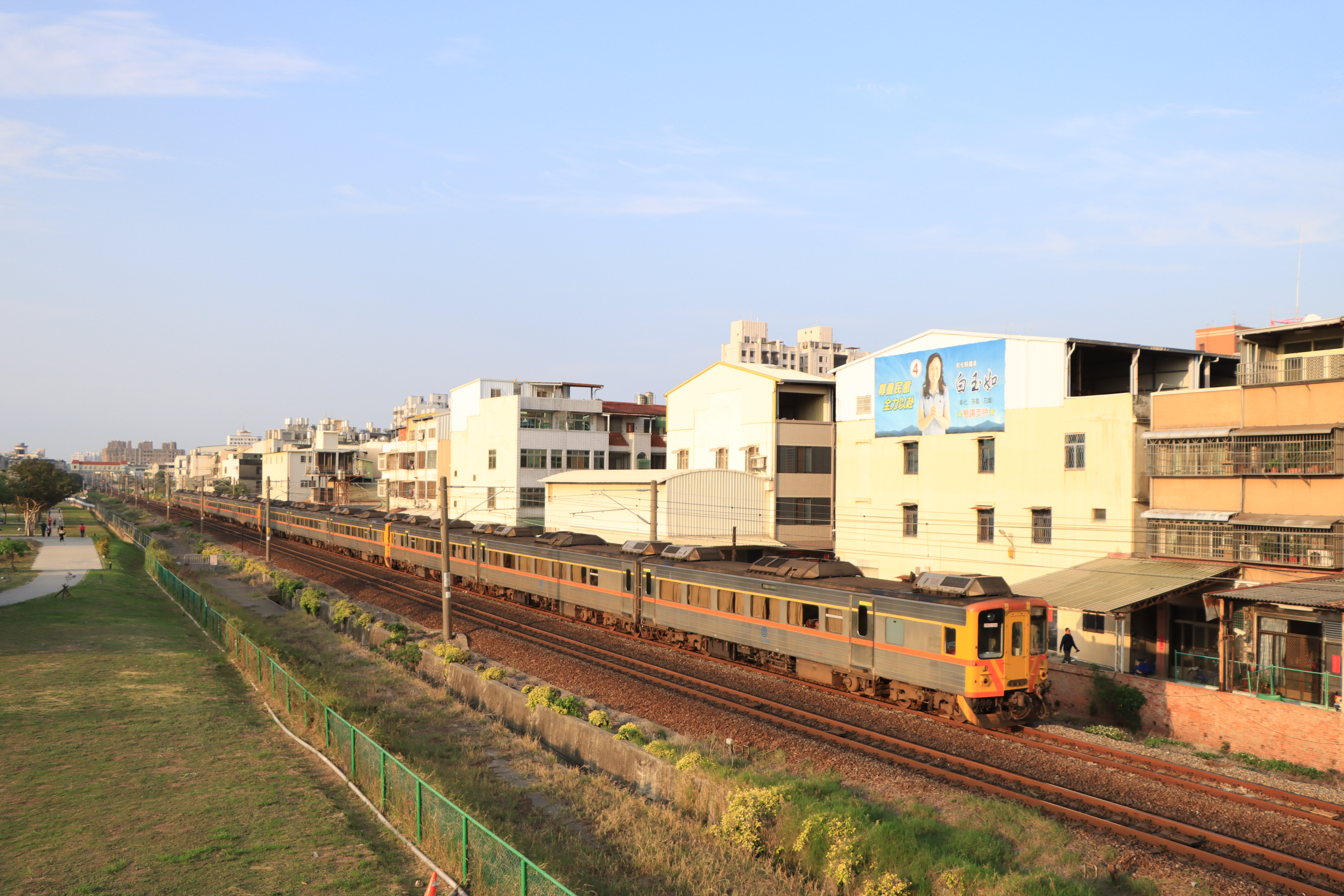
DR3100 between Changhua Station and Huatan Station

== Specifications and construction ==
=== Car body ===
Taking into account Taiwan's warm and humid climate, the DR3100 car bodies are constructed from SUS301L stainless steel. Window configuration features large windows paired with smaller supplementary windows. The type was also fitted with an electric tablet catcher protection pad in front of the passenger doors to prevent the tablet from striking the car body due to inertia at high speed, which would cause noise or damage; these protection pads were subsequently removed. Doors are provided at both ends of each car, and automatic plug-type sliding doors were fitted from new, making this the first batch of diesel intercity trains on Taiwan Railways to be delivered with automatic doors from the factory. This design not only improved convenience but also reduced the risk of accidents caused by unclosed doors. The headlight arrangement differs from the centralised layout of earlier diesel multiple units, being moved to above the left and right driver's windows.

The body livery follows the design inherited from the DR2800 through DR3000 series, with warning colour paintwork on the cab end to alert pedestrians ahead; the upper and lower edges of the windows are painted yellow and orange to improve visibility and enhance passengers' sense of safety. The side destination indicators were originally of the roller-blind type, mounted at the centre of the upper car body, sharing the same design as the DR1000. They were subsequently replaced with three-colour LED displays to improve flexibility, using the same model as those installed on the DR2800.

Under Taiwan Railways' rolling stock accessibility improvement programme, the DR3100 is the only diesel Tzu-Chiang Express type to have undergone accessibility conversion works, providing a more user-friendly barrier-free boarding environment.

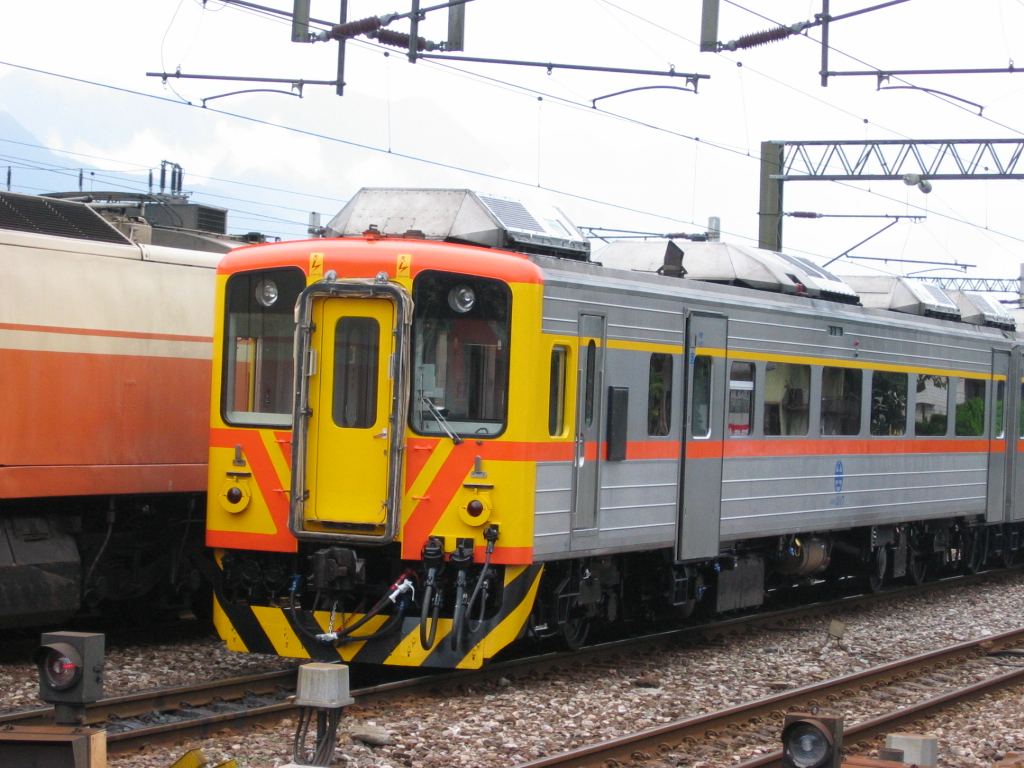
Car body exterior before side destination indicator conversion

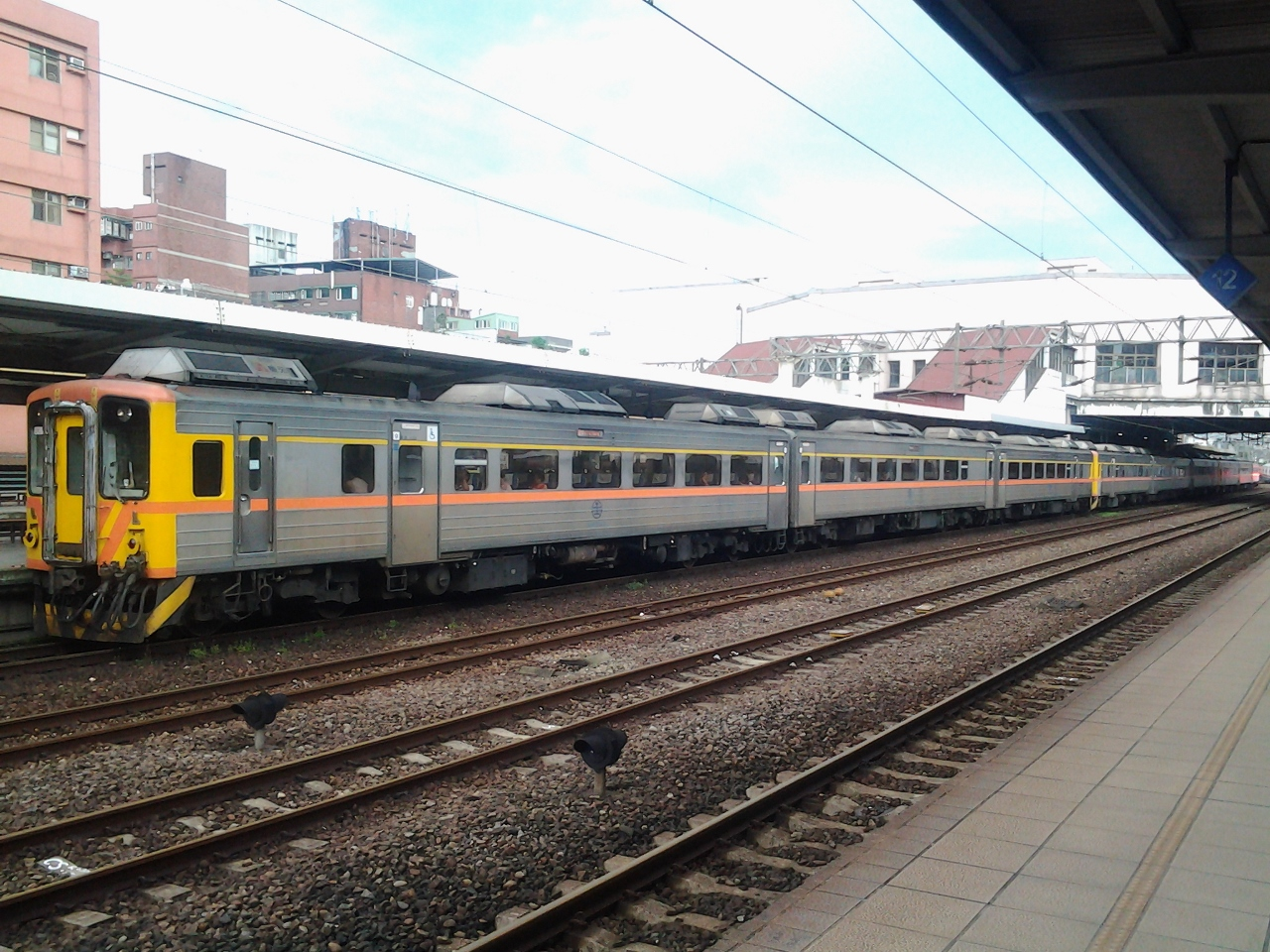
Car body exterior after side destination indicator conversion

=== Passenger saloon ===
The interior design of the DR3100 differs markedly from that of the DR2800 through DR3000 series, adopting a simple and clean aesthetic. During the initial period of operation, the aisle was covered with blue-and-white irregularly patterned floor mats, which were later replaced with red floor mats as the units aged. The interior walls are decorated with white panelling, and passenger seats are reversible reclining chairs of the same type used on the Chu-Kuang Express, in a 2+2 configuration, with the seat pitch increased to 1,120 mm compared with earlier diesel multiple unit Tzu-Chiang Express trains. Each car has 11 rows of 44 seats. The DR3100 cars differ between odd- and even-numbered examples in their facilities: odd-numbered cars are equipped with accessible Western-style toilets, while even-numbered cars have smaller squat-style toilets. The generator trailer DR3150 features a squat-style toilet, a small pantry area, a telephone booth, and 13 rows of 52 seats. Overhead luggage racks are provided above the seats, sharing the same design as the Tzu-Chiang Express introduced around the same period, for passengers to stow hand luggage; a cup holder is also installed below the window beside each seat. The moon gate decoration seen on the TRA DR2700 diesel passenger cars was eliminated, replaced with a simple cover panel. The cab layout is similar to that of the DR3000, positioned on the left side of the train and separated from the saloon by a partition. On the opposite side of the cab, a pair of reversible seats for two passengers is provided; due to the direct forward view it offers, this is colloquially known as the "king's seat" and is commonly used as the conductor's compartment or as a rest area for on-board maintenance staff. However, odd-numbered DR3100 cars have a larger toilet compartment and thus only a fold-down seat; even-numbered cars retain the full two-seat arrangement, hence their seating capacity is two higher than that of odd-numbered cars. The DR3150, having no driving cab, also has no "king's seat". The air conditioning system consists of two roof-mounted 16.9 kW air conditioners and two 3.5 kW heaters in each car to provide comfortable temperatures for passengers.

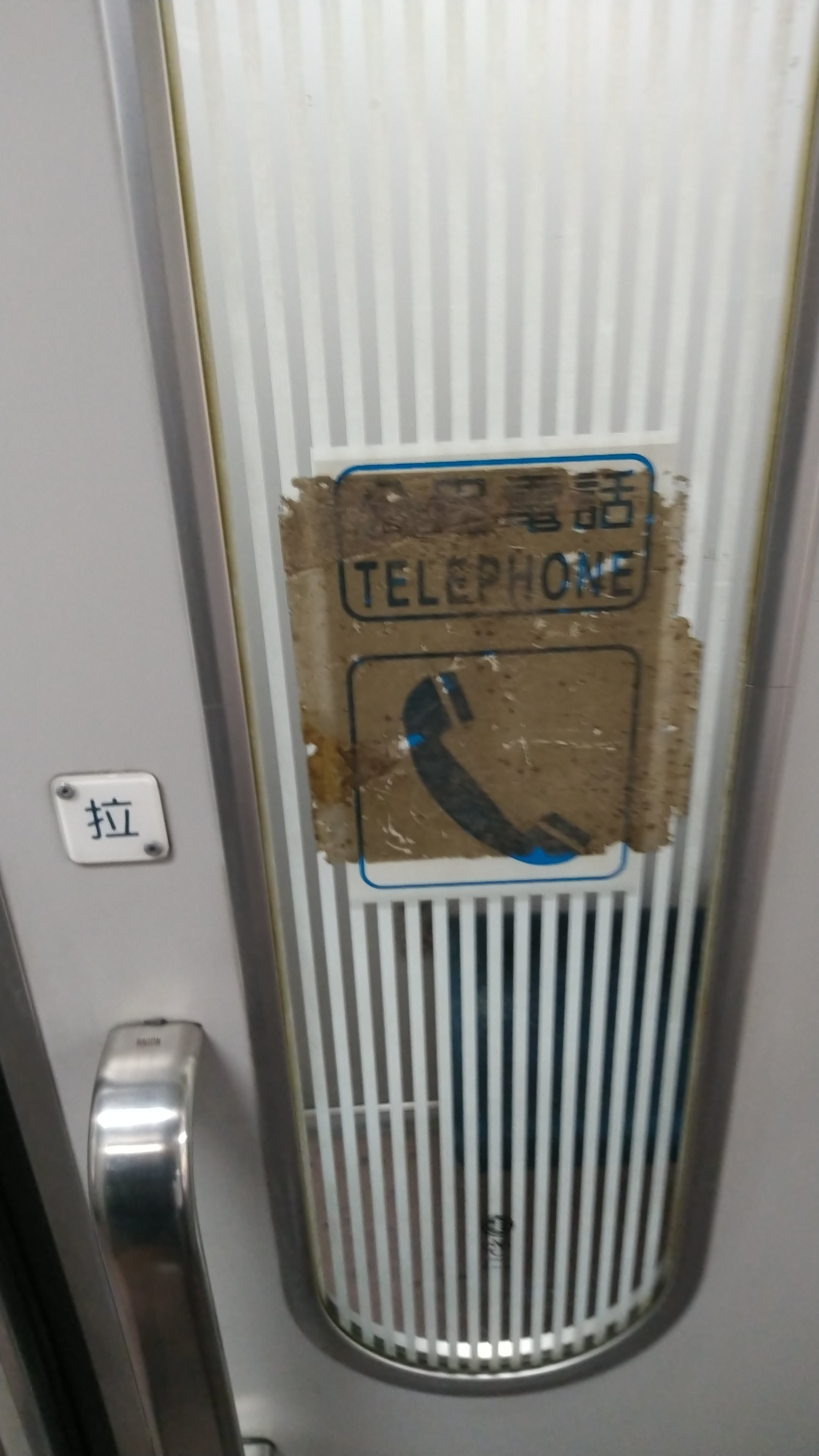
Telephone booth of a DR3150

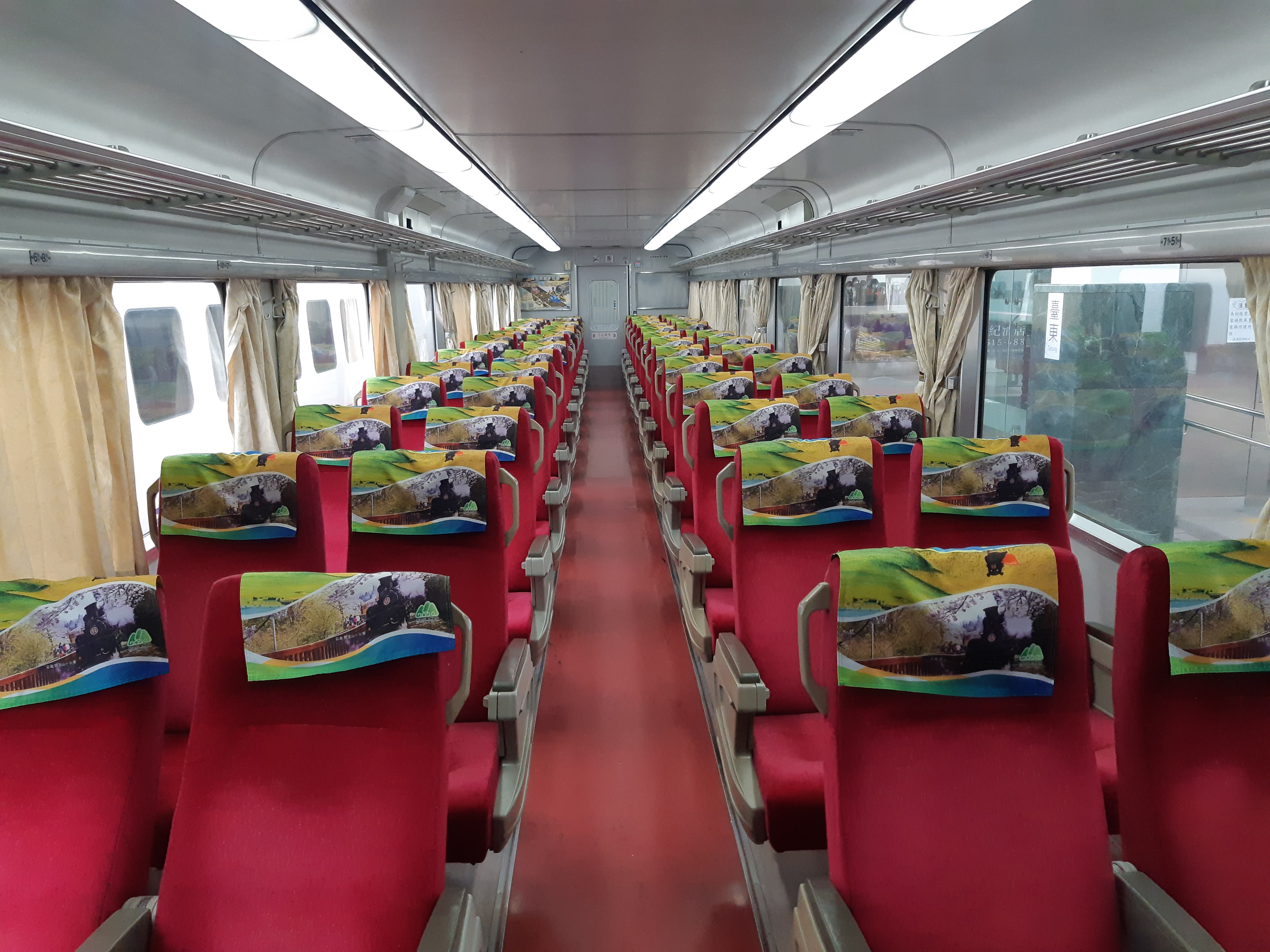
Car interior

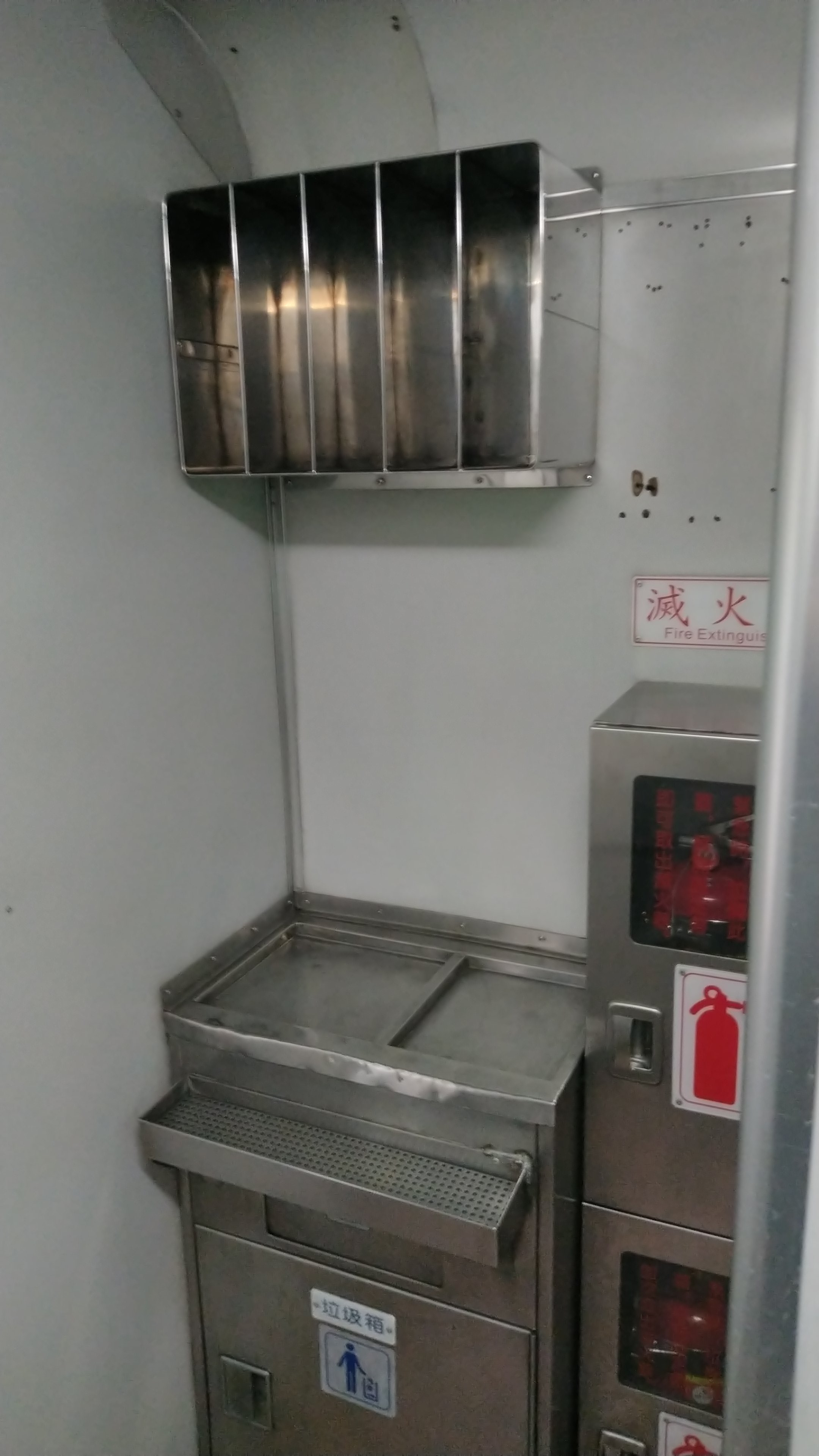
Pantry area

=== Propulsion system ===
The DR3100 was originally fitted with Cummins (Note: Transliterated within the Taiwan Railways system as "Guminshi" (固敏式)) NTA855-R1 diesel engines, each with a continuous output of 350 hp at 2,100 rpm, paired with a DBSF110 hydraulic torque converter manufactured by Niigata Engineering. The transmission can switch between the fluid coupling position in low gear and the direct coupling position in high gear, giving a maximum operational speed of 110 km/h. After the timetable revision of 26 April 2023, the DR2900 and DR3000 types were retired. The N14-R4 engines with which these vehicles had been re-equipped in 2011–2012 had relatively short service hours remaining and were still serviceable. As the DR3100 and DR1000 use the same NTA855-R1 engines, in order to extend equipment service life and make the best use of available resources, Taiwan Railways transferred the N14-R4 engines from retired vehicles to the DR3100; the NTA855-R1 engines removed from the DR3100 were in turn set aside as maintenance spares for the DR1000. The generator engines of the DR3150, not being involved in traction, were not replaced. For bogies, the DR3100 uses an air-cushion axle-beam bogie manufactured by Nippon Sharyo. The primary suspension uses metal springs, while the secondary suspension uses air springs. Power cars use the ND–727 bogie, (Note: Production numbers all begin with "DR3100".) while the unpowered generator trailer uses the ND–727T bogie. (Note: Production numbers all begin with "DR3150".)

The DR3100 braking system uses Japanese SMEE-type electromagnetic straight-air brakes. The main control device is based on the H-5C type with an automatic brake shoe clearance adjuster added, and synthetic brake shoes are used. The main air compressor is of the C1200 type.

=== Power generation equipment ===
All electrical power required by the train is supplied by the generator set on the DR3150 generator trailer. The generator set is driven by a Cummins NT855-R4 diesel engine, fitted with a 200 kVA three-phase AC brushless alternator. The engine delivers a fixed output of 270 hp at 1,800 rpm to meet the requirements of the generator. The electricity produced supplies: 440 V three-phase AC power for the air conditioning equipment; 110 V AC power for fluorescent lighting and ventilation fans; and 24 V DC power for control systems and battery charging. A single generator set can support up to two sets (six cars total) operating simultaneously. As the NT855-R4 engine is the same type used in the DR1000 and DR3100, the equipment removed from the retired DR2900 and DR3000 has also been retained as maintenance spares for future use.

=== Vehicle types and formation ===
DR3100 diesel multiple units are permanently formed in three-car sets, with the formation: power car DR3100 – generator trailer DR3150 – power car DR3100. During consecutive public holidays or special occasions with peak travel demand, up to five sets (15 cars) can be operated in multiple-unit formation. As the DR3100 uses the same control system as the DR2800, DR2900, DR3000, and DR1000 types, it is theoretically capable of multiple-unit operation with other diesel multiple unit types, (Note: In practice, coupling with other diesel multiple unit types has only occurred during factory acceptance test runs.) although in practice this has only occurred during factory acceptance test runs.

DR3100 (Power car)

There are 20 DR3100 power cars in total. Each car body incorporates a guard's compartment and a driving cab, and provides the main traction power. The roof carries engine coolers, exhaust pipes, and air conditioning equipment; the underframe carries fuel tanks, battery and instrument boxes, brake system control components, an air compressor, toilet water tanks, engine air filters, exhaust silencers, transmission oil tank, and contactor switches. Each car has a pantry and a toilet; toilet configurations differ between car numbers: odd-numbered cars have a larger toilet with accessible facilities for wheelchair users, while even-numbered cars have a smaller standard toilet without accessible facilities.

DR3150 (Generator trailer)

There are 10 DR3150 generator trailers in total. Each car is fitted with a diesel generator and transformers to supply power for the entire set. Rooftop equipment is broadly similar to that of the DR3100, and a pantry is provided inside; the underframe carries the generator set and associated electrical distribution equipment, supplying power for air conditioning and lighting.

	DR3100 ←（Southward） （Northward）→		
Car number	1, 4, 7, 10, 13	2, 5, 8, 11, 14	3, 6, 9, 12, 15
Type	40DR3100 (odd) (M)	40DR3150 (T)	40DR3100 (even) (M)
Other facilities	,		,
Seating	44	52	46

Legend

- : Driving cab, guard's seat (cars 1, 3, 4, 6, 7, 9, 10, 12, 13, 15)
- : Toilet

== Accidents ==
- 9 April 2009: Tzu-Chiang Express No. 2056 (Taitung–Fenyuan), while passing near Tainan Station, suffered a hot axle failure, causing delays to six train services and affecting approximately 2,000 passengers.
- 14 June 2012: Tzu-Chiang Express No. 305 (Zuoying–Hualien), while passing the portal of Dawu Tunnel No. 2 between Dawu and Longxi, struck a sudden landslide at the tunnel entrance, causing the first car to derail.
- 1 May 2015: Tzu-Chiang Express No. 371 (Taichung–Taitung), while stopped at Douliou Station, the axle of the fifth car seized and caught fire with smoke, but the fire was extinguished in time with no casualties.

== See also ==
- Tze-chiang limited express
- DR2800 series
- DR2900 series
