= DR3000 series =

Diesel multiple unit operated by Taiwan Railways, 1990–2023

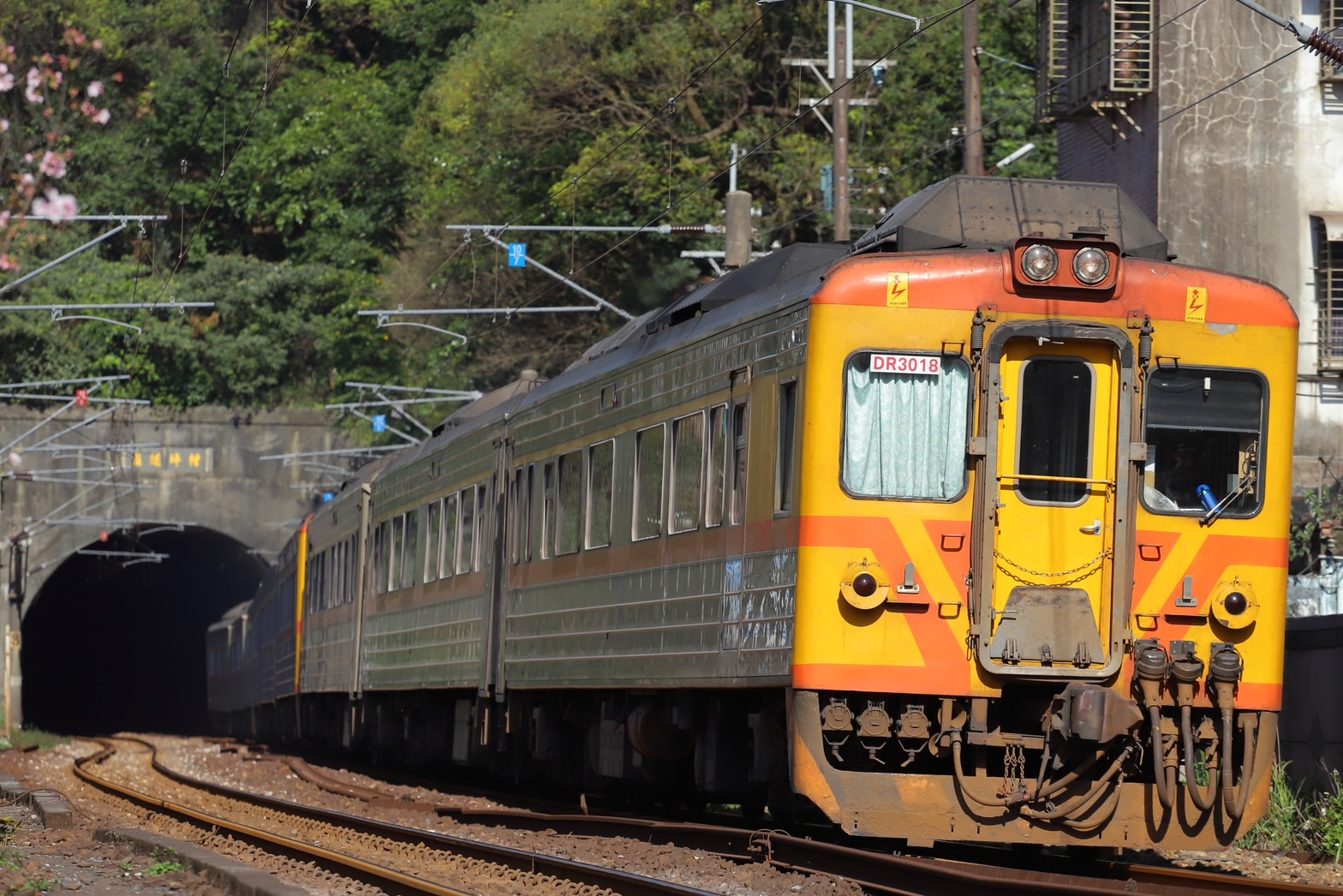
- TRA DR3000 series diesel multiple unit
- Stock type: Diesel multiple unit, intercity rail
- Manufacturer: Hitachi
- Assembly: Japan
- Constructed: 1990
- Entered service: December 18, 1990 (35 years, 158 days)
- Retired: April 26, 2023 (3 years, 29 days)
- Number built: DR3000 series: 54 vehicles DR3070 series: 27 vehicles 27 sets, 81 vehicles
- Design code: Power cars: DR3001–DR3054; Generator trailers: DR3071–DR3097; Power car: DR3000 series Generator trailer: DR3070 series
- Capacity: Before modification: Driving power car: 44; Generator trailer car: 54; After modification: Power car: 40; Generator trailer: 54
- Operator: Taiwan Railways Administration

Specifications
- Car body construction: Stainless steel
- Car length: 20,274
- Width: 2,850
- Height: 4,070
- Doors: DR3000 series: 1 passenger door at rear end, 1 emergency escape door at front end DR3070 series: 1 passenger door at each end of the car
- Maximum speed: 110 km/h
- Weight: DR3000 series: 39 t DR3070 series: 36
- Prime movers: Before modification: Cummins NT855-R4 diesel engine (Note: The driving power car and generator trailer use the same engine type.); After modification – Power car: Cummins N14-R4 diesel engine Generator trailer: Cummins NT855-R4 diesel engine
- Power output: Before modification: 335 HP / 2,100 rpm (power car); After modification: 350 HP / 2,350 rpm (power car); Generator: 270 HP / 1,800 rpm (generator trailer)
- Transmission: Niigata Tekko DBSF110 hydraulic transmission
- Bogies: DR3000 series: DTM-40 type bogie DR3070 series: DTT-40 type bogie
- Safety systems: ATW/ATS, ATP
- Track gauge: 1,067 mm (1,067 mm (3 ft 6 in))

Notes/references
- Maximum of 5 sets (15 vehicles) in multiple-unit operation.

The TRA DR3000 series diesel multiple unit is an air-conditioned diesel passenger car introduced by the Taiwan Railways Administration (TRA) in 1990, the third air-conditioned diesel multiple unit type operated by TRA. It was manufactured by Hitachi. In the early 1990s, despite the DR2800 and DR2900 series already operating Tze-chiang services on the eastern main line, tickets were still extremely difficult to obtain. Combined with the upcoming opening of the South Link Line, the need for additional rolling stock became urgent. On December 23, 2020, electrification of the South Link Line was completed across its full length, leaving no unelectrified sections on Taiwan's circular railway main lines. Combined with the gradual delivery of the new EMU3000 electric multiple units beginning in 2021, the operational need for diesel Tze-Chiang services diminished. After the timetable change on April 26, 2023, the DR3000 series was officially retired, ending 33 years of service on Taiwan's eastern main line.

== Background ==
=== History of introduction ===
Among the ten major construction projects of Taiwan in the 1970s, the construction of the North Link Line became one of the most important railway projects of the era. It connected Nanshenhu Station (Note: Now Su-ao New Station.) on the Yilan Line with Hualien Station, opening officially in February 1980. Subsequently, in July 1982, the Taitung Line completed a gauge conversion from 762 mm to 1,067 mm, making the Yilan Line, North Link Line, and Taitung Line the primary railway trunk lines in eastern Taiwan.

In the early 1990s, the existing DR2800 and DR2900 diesel multiple units could no longer meet the continuously growing passenger demand on the eastern main line. With the imminent opening of the South Link Line, the need for additional rolling stock became pressing. The decision was therefore made to purchase diesel multiple units of the same specifications as the DR2900 series from Hitachi of Japan as supplementary stock. In order to address the operational shortfall at once, 27 sets totaling 81 vehicles were ultimately procured, making this the largest single purchase of diesel passenger cars in Taiwan railway history to date. Since the vehicle design was largely identical to the DR2900 series, the numbering was originally intended to continue the DR2900 series sequence; however, as the number of cars was too large and would result in duplicate numbering, the type designation was changed to DR3000 for power cars and DR3070 for generator trailers. Although Hitachi was awarded the contract for the DR3000 series, it in fact subcontracted the construction of 15 vehicles to Kawasaki Heavy Industries and Tokyu Car Corporation without disclosing this to TRA; this was only revealed to TRA through a foreign railway magazine half a year after all vehicles had been delivered, and the matter was subsequently referred to the Control Yuan for censure.

=== Operational history ===
After multiple trial runs and preparation, the trains entered service on December 18, 1990, (Note: The source states 1900, which is a typographical error for 1990 in the original.) operating under the "Tze-Chiang" name on the eastern main line. Initially, because the DR3000 series was control-system-compatible with the DR2800 series, the two types were routinely coupled together in regular service. However, because the braking systems of the DR2800 and DR3000 series differed, coupling caused a jerking sensation during braking; consequently, after 2000, combined operation of the two types became rare except on consecutive holidays. The DR2900 and DR3000 series, having nearly identical braking systems without any jerk, were routinely coupled together instead. After the South Link Line opened on January 12, 1992, the service area expanded to the Western Line north section (to Shulin), the South Link Line, the Pingtung Line, the Western Line south section, and the Mountain Line (to Taichung). In 1998, service was extended to Fengyuan. With the late-1990s Banqiao–Shulin railway underground project, the operating section was changed to run between Shulin and Taitung. After 2000, the DR2900 and DR3000 series began sharing a common pool for coupled operation. On July 16, 2014, electrification of the entire Taitung Line was completed. With the addition of Puyuma Express trains on the eastern main line, some direct express services began to be operated by TEMU2000 sets. In 2015, electrification of the Pingtung Line between Pingtung and Chaozhou was completed; however, as electrification between Chaozhou and Fangliao had not yet been finished, local train services over the unelectrified section used the DR2900 or DR3000 series. After electrification was completed in 2019, these services switched to Electric multiple units (TRA). From October 16, 2016, following the opening of elevated tracks under the Taichung urban railway grade separation project, the gap between the new platform edges and the car doors was excessive, leading to the complete withdrawal of the DR3000 series from Mountain Line services; the southern terminus was changed to Changhua on the Western Line south section.

On December 23, 2020, electrification of the South Link Line was completed across its full length, leaving no unelectrified sections on Taiwan's circular railway main lines. Combined with the gradual delivery of the new EMU3000 electric Tze-Chiang express trains beginning in 2021, the operational demand for diesel Tze-Chiang services disappeared, and the number of scheduled workings was drastically reduced. The DR3000 series therefore began to be taken out of service rather than undergo overhaul upon reaching each Class A maintenance interval. From the timetable change on March 29, 2022, operating workings were reduced to just two sets: one assigned to commuter trains for staff at the Chaozhou depot, operating two round trips between Kaohsiung Machinery Workshop and Chaozhou Station Monday through Friday; and the other assigned to regular passenger services, operating 13 workings on the eastern main line and South Link Line between Shulin, Hualien, Zuoying, and Changhua. On June 29 of that year, services were further reduced to 10 workings, and on November 17 reduced again to only 6 workings. After the timetable change on April 26, 2023, the DR3000 series was officially retired, ending 33 years of service on Taiwan's eastern main line. On the day of retirement, TRA specially operated train No. 6688 from Shulin to Hualien as a farewell event. Throughout those 33 years, mechanical failures were rare; even when a failure occurred en route, the train was generally able to complete its journey and return to the depot under its own power without needing assistance.

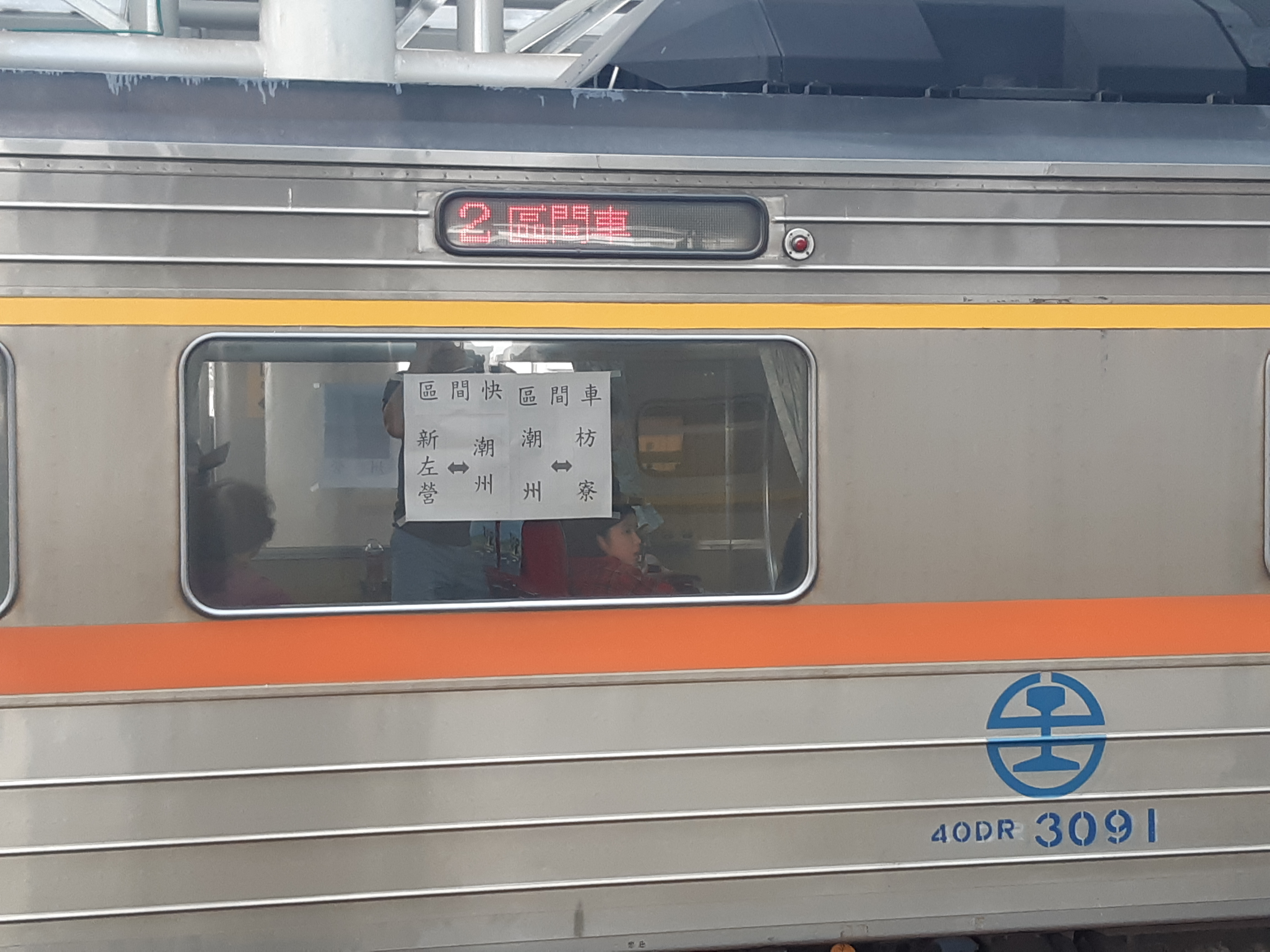
DR3000 operating a local service on the Pingtung Line

== Specifications and construction ==
=== Car body ===
Taking into account Taiwan's warm and humid climate, the car body of the DR3000 series was constructed of stainless steel, with a design identical to that of the DR2900 series. The window design features large windows alternating with small windows. DR3000 series trains were fitted with an electric tablet catcher guard in front of the escape door to prevent the tablet from striking the car body and causing noise or damage due to inertia at high speed; the original tablet guard has since been removed. Behind this guard is an emergency escape door, enabling rapid passenger evacuation in the event of an accident. The passenger boarding doors are located at the rear end of the car, while the DR3070 series has boarding doors at both ends of each car. New vehicles were fitted with manual folding doors, but beginning in 2009, to prevent passengers from falling out due to an improperly closed door, the DR3000 series was progressively modified by the Nanzhou plant of Chinyang Corporation, primarily replacing the folding doors with sliding plug-type electric doors. (Note: The emergency door was not modified because its conversion would require changes to the interior design.) This improved both convenience and safety by reducing the risk of accidents caused by doors left unclosed. Because jumper cables for the automatic door interlock system had to be installed, the external appearance at the car ends changed slightly: the number of inter-car jumper cables increased from two to three, the position of the tail lights shifted slightly upward, and the electrical tail light bracket moved from above the tail light to beside it. The livery is identical to that of the DR2900 series: the front end features a warning color scheme to alert pedestrians, and yellow and orange stripes are applied along the upper and lower edges of the windows to increase visibility and enhance passenger sense of safety. The DR3000 series carried the TRA emblem above the car number from new, so in the early years the only way to distinguish a DR3000 from a DR2900 at a distance was by the emblem on the car body.

The side destination indicator on the trains was originally a roller blind type installed above the doors. To allow for greater flexibility in displayed content, when the doors were renewed in 2009 the indicators were replaced with tri-color LED displays, relocated from above the doors to above the center section of the car body. The space above the doors previously occupied by the roller blind destination indicator was repurposed for the automatic door mechanism; the LED displays are of the same type as those used on the DR2800 series.

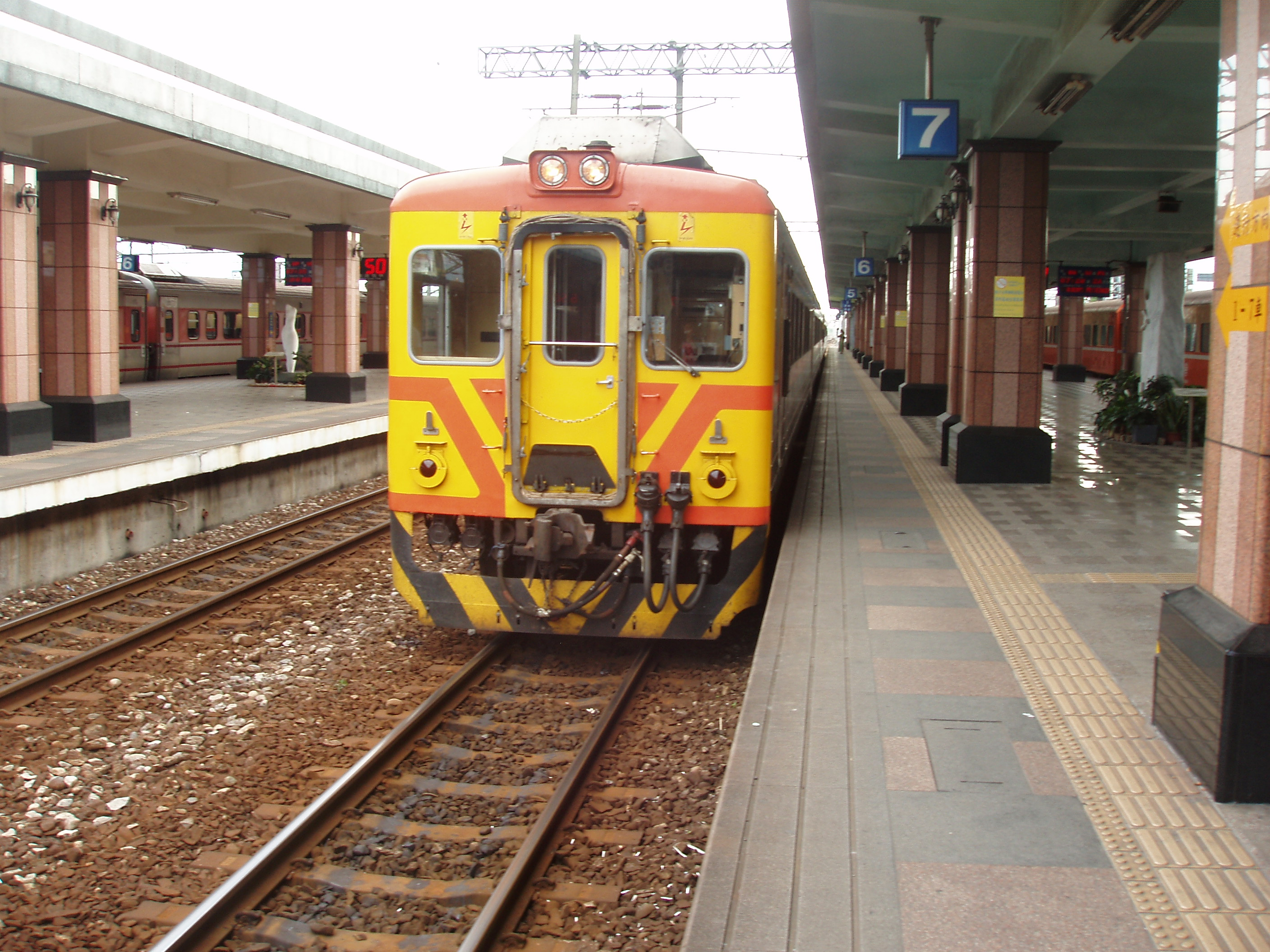
Appearance before automatic door jumper cable modification

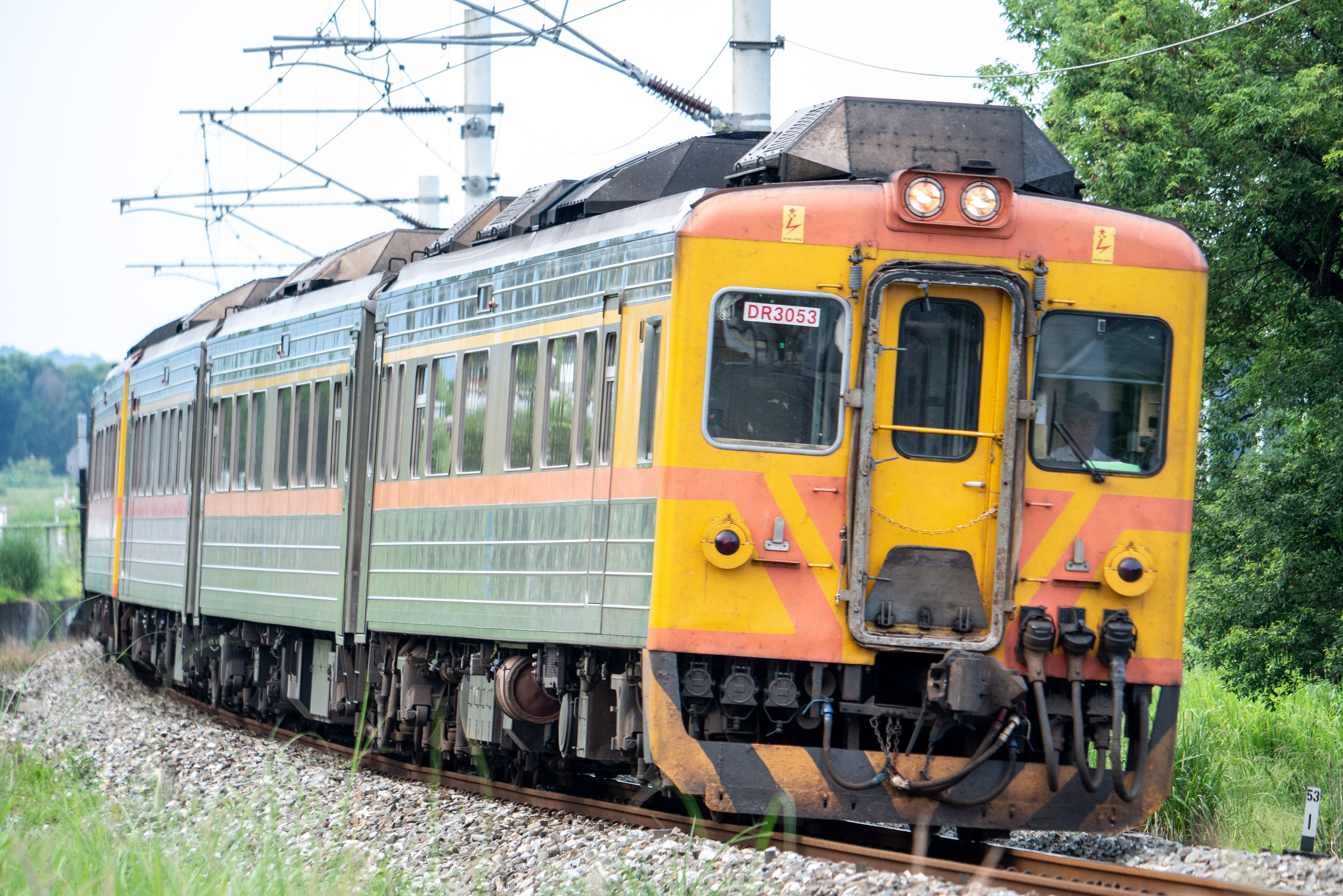
Changed position of jumper cables after automatic door modification

=== Passenger saloon ===
The interior design of the DR3000 series is essentially the same as that of the DR2900 series. The aisle is carpeted, the walls are finished with wood-grain paneling, and the seats are reversible reclining chairs identical to those used on Chu-Kuang trains, arranged in a 2+2 configuration with a seat pitch of 1,100 mm. There are 11 rows of 22 pairs of seats, totaling 44 seats. In July 2003, following the Sunlong Bus Highway fire incident, the four seats adjacent to the emergency door were removed, reducing seating to 40. The DR3070 generator trailer has no toilet, only a simple galley area, allowing more seats to be installed: 14 rows on the odd-numbered side and 13 rows on the even-numbered side due to the galley, totaling 54 seats. Above the seats are luggage racks; the design differs considerably from that of the DR2900 series in that a metal rail guard is fitted along the outer edge of the rack to prevent luggage from sliding off. The DR3000 series has green guard rails, while the DR3070 series has orange guard rails. Below the windows, a cup holder is installed beside each seat. The interior features arch doorways similar to those of the DR2700 diesel passenger cars, within which heat piping and exhaust pipes are routed, with metal decorative panels adorning the arches. The aisle carpeting was later removed to simplify maintenance and procurement. The DR3000 power car has a separate driver's cab on the left side of the train, partitioned from the saloon by a small divider panel; on the opposite side of the cab is a two-person reversible reclining seat which, separated from the general passenger area by a partition and offering a forward view of the track ahead, became colloquially known as the "King's Seat" (天王座). This seat was generally used as the conductor's rest area or as a rest space for on-board maintenance staff. The DR3070 series, having no driver's cab, has no equivalent "King's Seat" section.

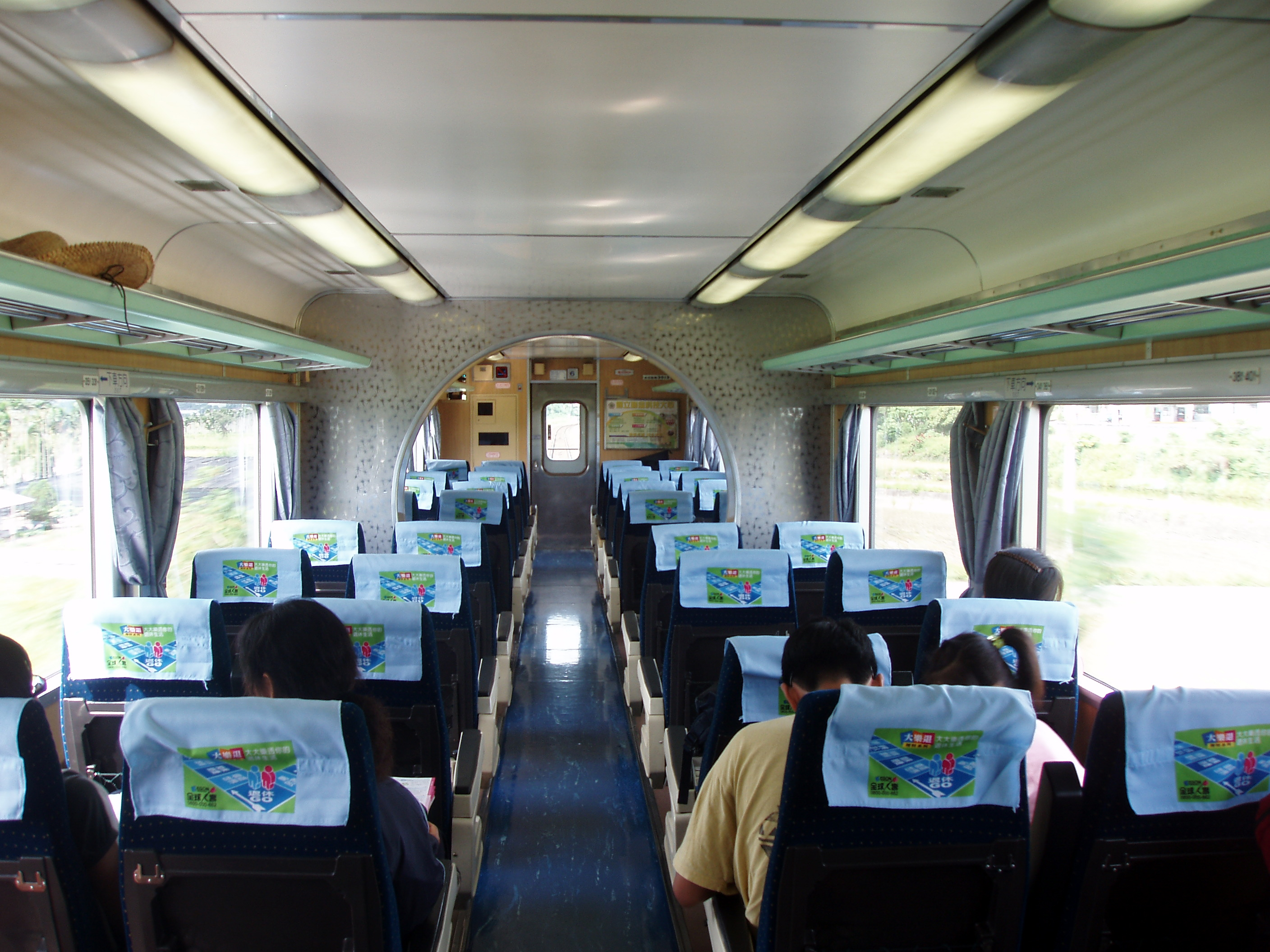
Interior of DR3000 series diesel multiple unit

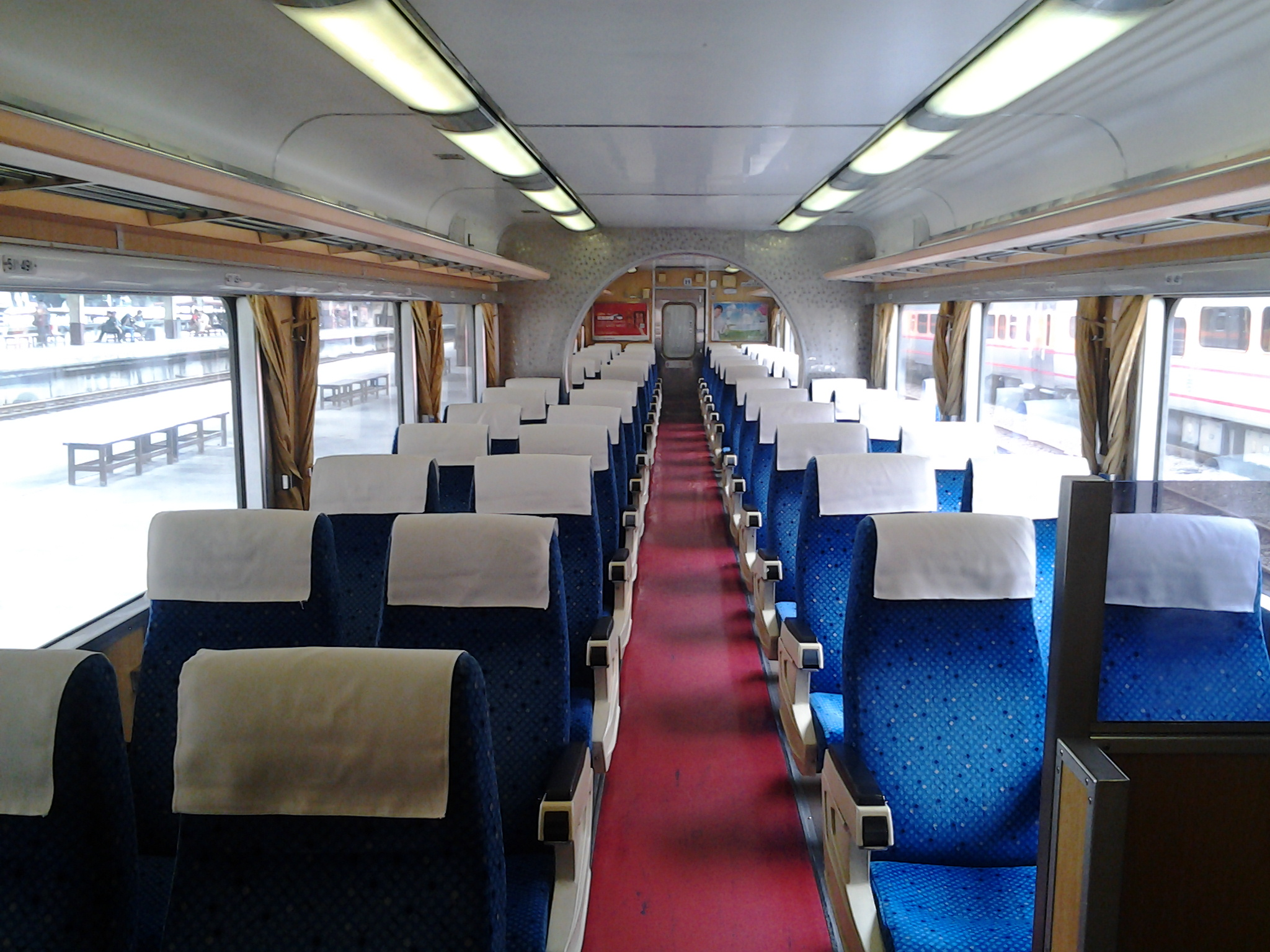
Interior of DR3070 series diesel multiple unit

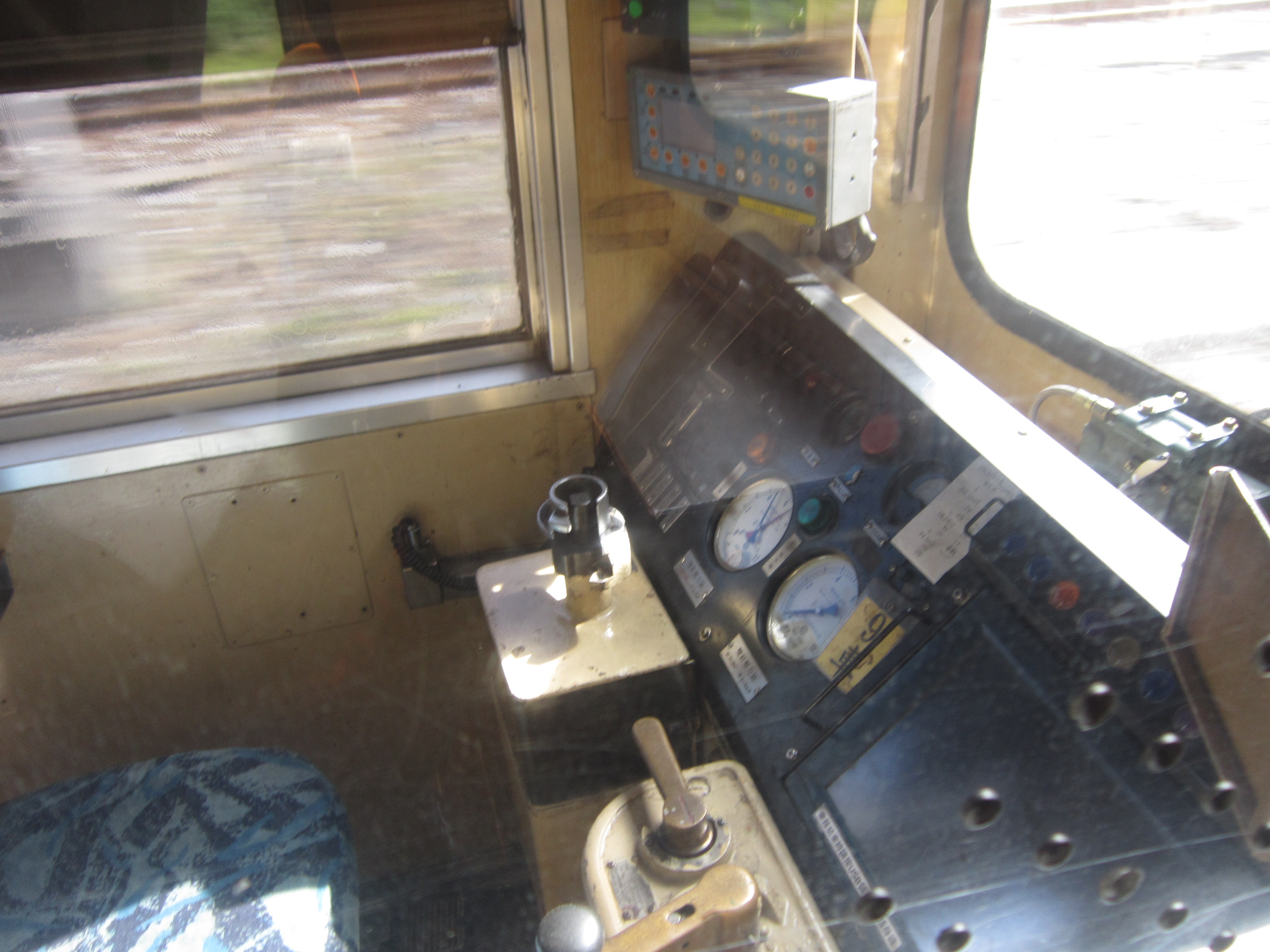
Cab of the DR3000

=== Powertrain ===
The DR3000 series diesel multiple unit was originally equipped with Cummins (Note: Transliterated by TRA as "Guminshi" (固敏式).) NT855-R4 diesel engines, with a continuous output of 310 hp / 2,100 rpm per set, paired with a DBSF110 hydraulic torque converter manufactured by Niigata Tekko, switchable between fluid coupling (low-speed range) and direct coupling (high-speed range), giving the trains a maximum speed of 110 km/h. In the early 2010s, the traction NT855-R4 engines became increasingly worn, frequently resulting in insufficient power and delays. Between 2011 and 2012, they were progressively replaced with the more powerful N14-R4 engines, raising continuous output to 350 hp per set. The generator engines of the DR3070 series were not replaced, as they do not affect traction performance. After the DR3000 series was retired, as the N14-R4 engines had seen relatively little use, and since the active DR3100 and DR1000 diesel fleets both use the NTA855-R1 engine type, the N14-R4 engines were removed and fitted to DR3100 series vehicles to make full use of both engine types, while the engines originally in the DR3100 series were removed for use as spare parts for the DR1000 fleet. The engine cooling radiators on the DR3000 series are mounted on the car roof in the same manner as those on the DR2700 series. The cooling fans are hydraulically driven and automatically regulated according to the diesel engine's rotational speed to maintain coolant temperature within the normal range.

The DR3000 series uses Hitachi bolster-type bogies: the primary suspension consists of metal coil springs, while the secondary suspension uses air spring bolsters. Power cars use the DTM-40 type bogie (Note: Production serial numbers all begin with DR3000.) and unpowered generator trailers use the DTT-40 type bogie. (Note: Production serial numbers all begin with DR3070.)

=== Power generation ===
All electrical power required by the train is supplied entirely by the generator set aboard the DR3070 generator trailer. This generator set is driven by a Cummins NT855-R4 engine paired with a Fuji Electric 3FC5314E-4Z type three-phase AC brushless alternator. The engine runs at a fixed speed of 270 HP / 1,800 rpm to meet the generator's output requirements. The electricity produced supplies 440 V three-phase AC for air conditioning, 110 V AC for fluorescent lighting and ventilation fans, and 24 V DC for control systems and battery charging. A single generator set can supply up to two coupled sets, serving six cars in total. Since the NT855-R4 engine and 3FC5314E-4Z generator are the same types used in the DR1000 and DR3100 series, these components were removed upon retirement and kept as maintenance spare parts.

=== Safety systems ===
The DR3000 series was originally equipped with Ericsson-manufactured Automatic Warning System (AWS) and Automatic Train Stop (ATS-SN and ATS-P) safety systems. On November 15, 1991, the Zaoqiao train collision occurred, killing 30 people and injuring 112, prompting TRA to begin planning an upgrade from the older AWS and ATS systems to a new ATP system. TRA introduced Bombardier Transportation-manufactured Automatic Train Protection (ATP) in 2007, conforming to European Rail Traffic Management System Level 1 standards (including ETCS). However, due to a high failure rate, many drivers chose to disable the ATP system. Following the 2007 Dali Station train collision, which killed 5 people and injured 17, TRA launched its "Circular Railway Integrated System Safety Enhancement Plan" in 2009 and installed an ATP remote monitoring system.

=== Vehicle types and formation ===
Each DR3000 series set is permanently formed as a three-car unit, with power cars at both ends and a generator trailer in the middle. During consecutive holidays or special events with high demand, up to five sets (15 cars) may operate coupled together. The formation consists of driving power car DR3000, generator trailer DR3070, and driving power car DR3000. The DR3000 series uses the same control system as the DR2800, DR2900, and subsequently introduced DR3100 and DR1000 series, enabling multiple-unit control operation with these other diesel multiple unit types. (Note: Inter-type coupling is usually only carried out during factory trial runs.) The maximum is 5 sets (15 vehicles) in multiple-unit operation.

DR3000 series
The driving power car, equipped with a conductor's compartment, driver's cab, and traction engine. There are 54 vehicles in total. The car roof carries the engine cooling radiator, exhaust pipe, and air conditioning equipment; the interior includes a toilet and a galley. Below the underframe are the fuel tank, battery and instrument box, control components for the basic brake system, air compressor, toilet water tank, engine air filter, exhaust silencer, transmission oil tank, contactor switches, and other equipment. The DR3000 power car originally had 44 seats; after the seats near the emergency door were removed, the count was reduced to 40.

DR3070 series
The generator trailer, equipped with the generator set. There are 27 vehicles in total. The roof equipment is broadly the same as that of the DR3000 power car; the interior includes a galley, and the underframe carries a diesel generator and transformer as the electrical power source for the air conditioning system. The DR3070 generator trailer originally had 54 seats.

	DR3000 ←← (reverse direction) （forward direction）→→		
Car number	1, 4, 7, 10, 13	2, 5, 8, 11, 14	3, 6, 9, 12, 15
Type	40DR3000 (M)	40DR3070 (T)	40DR3000 (M)
Other facilities	,		,
Seating capacity	38	46	38

Key

- : Driver's cab, conductor's seat (cars 1, 3, 4, 6, 7, 9, 10, 12, 13, 15)
- : Toilet

== Modifications ==
In 2009, the original manual doors were replaced with automatic doors, and the original roller blind destination indicators were updated to LED displays. Detailed information on these modifications is provided in the car body section above. Under the TRA low-floor platform modification plan that began in 2016, this series was initially included in the list of vehicles to be modified; the modifications were to be the same as those for automatic-door Chu-Kuang carriages, but due to the purchase of new intercity trains, electrification of the South Link Line, and the age of the vehicles, the series was subsequently removed from the plan.

== Preserved vehicles ==
Of the DR3000 series diesel fleet, only one vehicle is preserved in operational condition and one in static display. The vehicle preserved for static display is DR3051, which was involved in a debris flow accident in Fanshan No. 2 Tunnel on August 31, 2013; after restoration by Hualien Workshop in 2019, it is on display at Linrong Shin Kong station. The vehicle preserved in operational condition is generator trailer DR3092, used as an accommodation car for the emergency train of the Taitung Motive Power Depot.

== Accidents ==
On March 27, 1997, Tze-Chiang express train No. 1083, running from Shulin to Su'ao, encountered a concrete pump truck carrying out slope work inside Wai'ao station that had inadvertently encroached onto the track, causing the train to collide with it at high speed. The accident killed the concrete pump truck driver and left more than 20 train passengers with injuries of varying severity.

On August 9, 2002, deadhead train No. 2051A, running from Changhua to Fengyuan, was about to pass through Taichung Station at 5:20 a.m. when an overheight container truck struck the crossover bridge at the south end of the station, damaging the rail. The train subsequently derailed at high speed and struck platform 1, leaving 3 people with injuries of varying severity.

On April 9, 2009, Tze-Chiang express train No. 2056, running from Taitung to Fengyuan, suffered a hot axlebox incident near Bao-an in Rende Township, Tainan County. (Note: Now Rende District, Tainan City.) On April 5, 2010, the same train running from Taitung to Fengyuan suffered an engine drop from one car, DR3071, between Xishi and Linluo stations.

On August 31, 2013, Tze-Chiang express train No. 302, running from Taitung to Zuoying, struck a debris flow between Fangye and Jialuh stations, leaving 17 passengers with injuries of varying severity.

On June 22, 2016, Tze-Chiang express train No. 307, running from Zuoying to Hualien, suffered a derailment and overturning of cars 7 through 9 at the rear of the train between Ruisui and Fuyuan due to damaged track, injuring 2 independent travelers from mainland China.

On September 18, 2022, while Tze-Chiang express train No. 420, running from Hualien to Taitung, was at Dongli Station, the Taitung earthquake caused a collapse of the station platform canopy, which fell onto the train. Cars 1, 1C, 2, 5, 6, and 7 derailed and tilted; the 20 passengers aboard were uninjured.

== See also ==
- Tze-chiang limited express
- DR2800 series
- DR2900 series
