= Steelmaking =

Process for producing steel

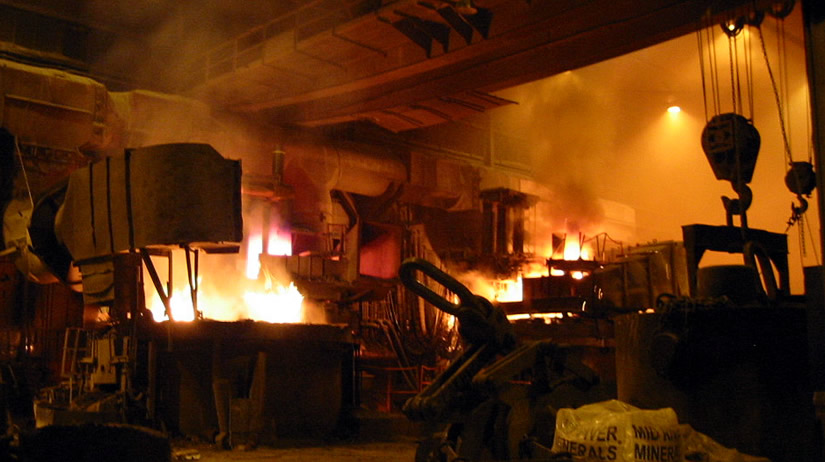
Steel mill with two arc furnaces

Steelmaking is the process of producing steel from iron ore and/or scrap. Steel has been made for millennia and was commercialized on a massive scale in the 1850s and 1860s, using the Bessemer and Siemens-Martin processes. Currently, two major commercial processes are used. Basic oxygen steelmaking (BOS) uses liquid pig iron from a blast furnace and scrap steel as the main feed materials. Electric arc furnace (EAF) steelmaking uses scrap steel or direct reduced iron (DRI). Oxygen steelmaking has become more popular over time.

Steelmaking is one of the most carbon emission-intensive industries. In 2020, the steelmaking industry was reported to be responsible for 7% of energy sector greenhouse gas emissions. The industry is seeking significant emission reductions.

== Steel ==
Steel is made from iron and carbon. Cast iron is a hard, brittle material that is difficult to work, whereas steel is malleable, relatively easily formed, and versatile. On its own iron is not strong, but a low concentration of carbon – less than 1 percent, depending on the kind of steel – gives steel strength and other important properties. Impurities such as nitrogen, silicon, phosphorus, sulfur, and excess carbon (the most important impurity) are removed, and alloying elements such as manganese, nickel, chromium, carbon, and vanadium are added to produce different grades of steel.

== History ==
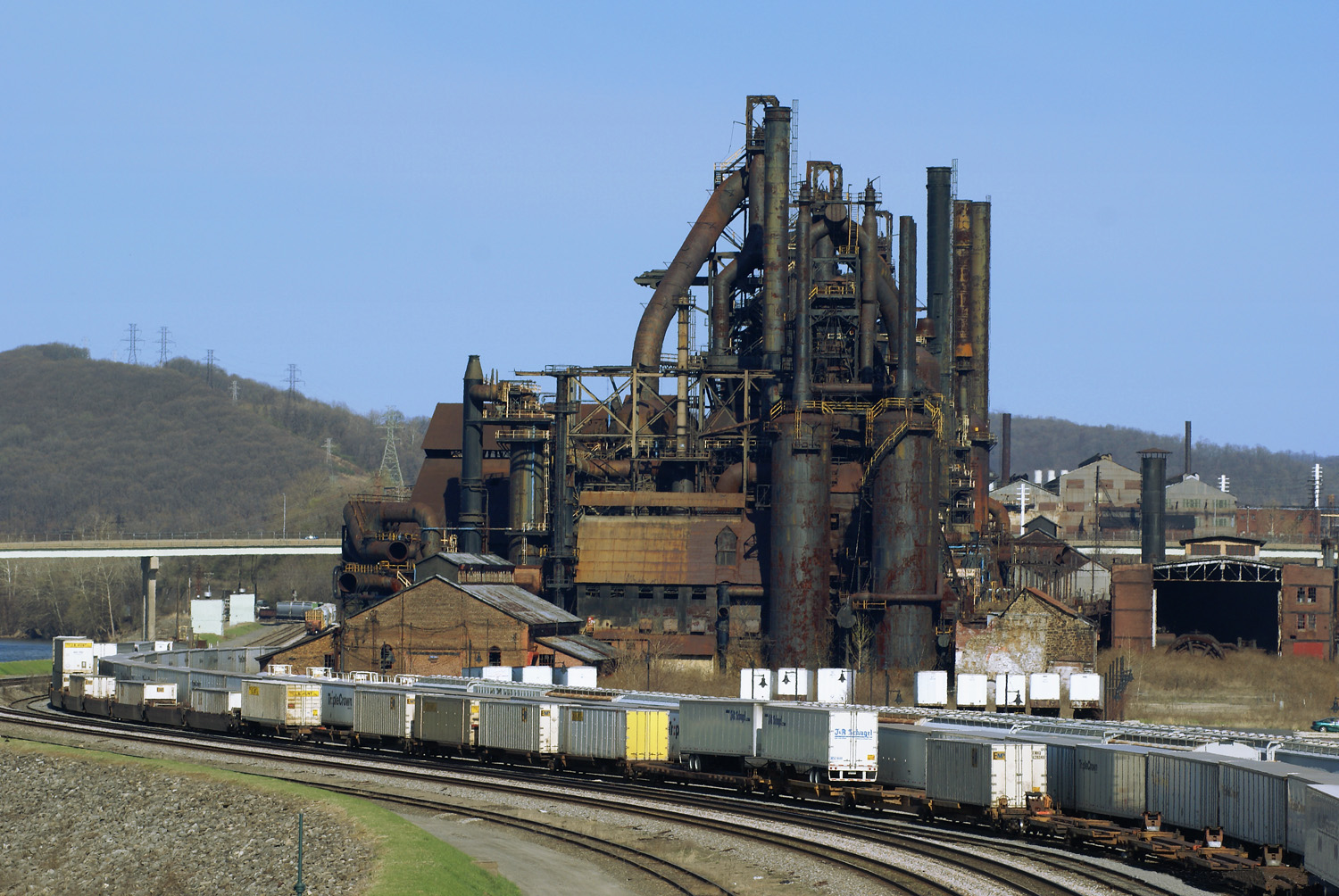
Bethlehem Steel in Bethlehem, Pennsylvania, was one of the world's largest manufacturers of steel before its 2003 closure.

=== Early history ===
Early processes evolved during the classical era in China, India, Rome and among hunter-foragers in northern Sweden. The earliest means of producing steel was in a bloomery. For much of human history, steel was made only in small quantities. Early modern methods of producing steel were often labor-intensive and highly skilled arts. The Bessemer process and subsequent developments allowed steel to become integral to the global economy. Chahak was a crucible steel making center in medieval Persia, which is also the first known example chromium steel production.

==== China ====
The earliest description of a co-fusion steelmaking process is found in biography of Qiwu Huaiwen, who was active in the 6th century AD. Shen Kuo, in an account associated with his 1075 inspection tour of Cizhou, described two steelmaking methods. The first combined wrought iron and cast iron, a process which Wagner identifies as co-fusion steelmaking. The second involved repeatedly heating and hammering wrought iron; Wagner interprets this as cementation, using the term broadly for processes in which solid iron absorbs carbon from a carbon-monoxide-rich atmosphere. An earlier interpretation by Hartwell described the latter technique as the partial decarburization of cast iron by repeated forging under a cold blast.

==== Europe ====
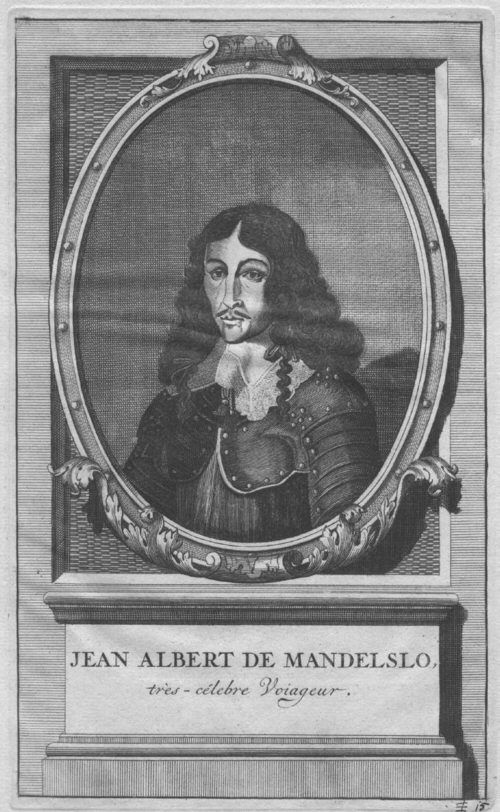
Johan Albrecht de Mandelslo described the Japanese use of the Bessemer process.

In the 15th century, the finery process, which shares the air-blowing principle with the Bessemer process, was developed in Europe. High-quality steel was also made by the reverse process of adding carbon to carbon-free wrought iron, usually imported from Sweden. The manufacturing process, called the cementation process, consisted of heating bars of wrought iron together with charcoal for periods of up to a week in a long stone box. This produced blister steel. The blister steel was put in a crucible with wrought iron and melted, producing crucible steel. Up to 3 tons of (then expensive) coke was burnt for each ton of steel produced. When rolled into bars such steel was sold at £50 to £60 (approximately £3,390 to £4,070 in 2008) per long ton. The most difficult and laborious part of the process was the production of wrought iron in finery forges in Sweden.

In 1740 Benjamin Huntsman developed the crucible technique for steel manufacture at his workshop in Handsworth, England. This process greatly improved the quantity and quality of steel production. It added three hours firing time and required large quantities of coke. In making crucible steel, the blister steel bars were broken into pieces and melted in small crucibles, each containing 20 kg or so. This produced higher quality metal but increased the cost.

The Bessemer process reduced the time needed to make lower-grade steel to about half an hour while requiring only enough coke needed to melt the pig iron. The earliest Bessemer converters produced steel for £7 per long ton, although it initially sold for around £40 per ton.

==== Japan ====
The Japanese may have made use of a Bessemer-type process, as observed by 17th century European travellers. Adventurer Johan Albrecht de Mandelslo describes the process in a book published in English in 1669. He writes, "They have, among others, particular invention for the melting of iron, without the using of fire, casting it into a tun done about on the inside without about half a foot of earth, where they keep it with continual blowing, take it out by ladles full, to give it what form they please." Wagner states that Mandelslo did not visit Japan, so his description of the process is likely derived from other accounts. Wagner states that the Japanese process may have been similar to the Bessemer process but cautions that alternative explanations are plausible.

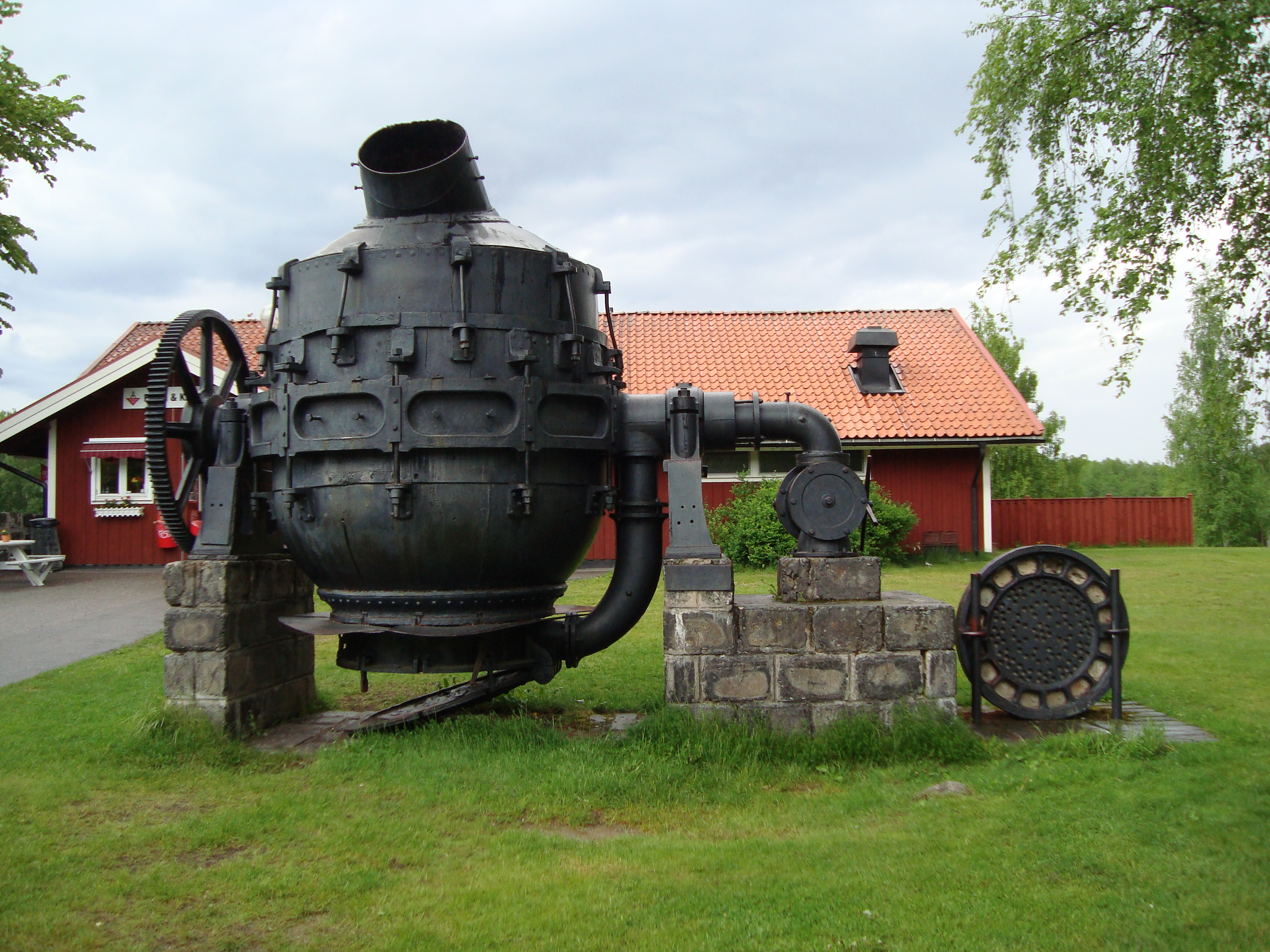
Bessemer converter at Högbo Bruk, Sandviken.

By the early 19th century the puddling process was widespread. At the time, process heat was too low to entirely remove slag impurities, but the reverberatory furnace made it possible to heat iron without placing it directly in the fire, offering some protection from impurities in the fuel source. Coal then began to replace charcoal as fuel.

By the 1850s the Bessemer process allowed steel to be produced without fuel, using the iron's impurities to create the necessary heat. This drastically reduced costs, but raw materials with the required characteristics were not always easy to find.

== Processes ==
Distribution of world steel production by methods

Modern steelmaking consists of three steps: primary, secondary, and tertiary. Primary steelmaking involves melting iron into steel. Secondary steelmaking involves adding or removing other elements such as alloying agents and dissolved gases. Tertiary steelmaking casts molten metal into sheets, rolls or other forms. Multiple techniques are available for each step.

=== Primary steelmaking ===
==== Basic oxygen ====
Basic oxygen steelmaking (BOS) involves melting carbon-rich pig iron that has been developed by smelting iron ore in a blast furnace and converting it into steel. Blowing oxygen through molten pig iron oxidizes some of the carbon into CO^{−} and CO_{2}, turning the iron into steel. Refractories (materials resistant to decomposition under high temperatures)—calcium oxide and magnesium oxide—line the smelting vessel to withstand the heat, corrosive molten metal, and slag. The chemistry is controlled to remove impurities such as silicon and phosphorus.

BOS was developed in 1948 by Robert Durrer, as a refinement of the Bessemer converter that replaced air with (more efficient) pure oxygen. It reduced plant capital costs and smelting time and increased labor productivity. In 2013, 70% of global steel output came from the basic oxygen furnace. Furnaces can convert up to 350 tons of iron into steel in less than 40 minutes, compared to 10–12 hours in an open-hearth furnace.

==== Electric arc ====
An electric arc furnace (EAS) makes steel from scrap or direct reduced iron. A "heat" (batch) of iron is loaded into the furnace, sometimes with a "hot heel" (molten steel from a previous heat). Gas burners may assist with the melt. As with BOS, fluxes are added to protect the vessel lining and aid the removal of impurities. A furnace is typically 100 tonne-capacity that produces steel every 40 to 50 minutes. This process allows larger alloy additions than BOS.

==== HIsarna ====
In HIsarna ironmaking, iron ore is processed almost directly into liquid iron or pig iron. The process is based around a cyclone converter blast furnace, which makes it possible to skip the intermediary production of pig iron pellets required for BOS. Skipping this preparatory step makes the HIsarna process more energy-efficient and reduces the CO_{2} emissions by around 20%.

==== Hydrogen reduction ====
Direct-reduced iron can be produced from iron ore as it reacts with atomic hydrogen. Renewable hydrogen allows steelmaking without fossil fuels. Direct reduction occurs at 1,500 °F (820 °C). The iron is infused with carbon (from coal) in an electric arc furnace. Hydrogen electrolysis requires approximately 2,600 kWh per ton of steel. Hydrogen production raises costs by an estimated 20–30% over conventional methods.

=== Secondary steelmaking ===
The next step commonly uses ladles. Ladle operations include de-oxidation (or "killing"), vacuum degassing, alloy addition, inclusion removal, inclusion chemistry modification, de-sulphurisation, and homogenisation. It is common to perform ladle operations in gas-stirred ladles with electric arc heating in the furnace lid. Tight control of ladle metallurgy produces high grades of steel with narrow tolerances.

== Tertiary steelmaking ==
Tertiary steelmaking refers to the final stage of the manufacturing process where molten steel is solidified and shaped into semi-finished or finished products. This stage is distinct from the chemical refining of the primary and secondary stages, focusing instead on physical form and surface properties.

=== Casting ===
Before steel can be rolled, it must be solidified.

- Continuous casting: This is the dominant method used for over 95% of global production. Molten steel flows from a ladle into a tundish and then through a water-cooled copper mold. The steel emerges as a continuous red-hot strand, which is straightened and cut. This produces standardized shapes such as slabs (for flat products), blooms (for structural sections), and billets (for long products like wire).
- Ingot casting: In this older batch process, steel is poured into stationary molds. It is still used today for specific high-alloy steels or for extremely large components (such as generator shafts) that exceed the physical capacity of continuous casters.

=== Forming and finishing ===
The solidified steel undergoes mechanical working to achieve its final dimensions and mechanical properties.

- Hot rolling: The steel is heated above its recrystallization temperature and passed through heavy rollers. This reduces the thickness of the metal and refines the internal grain structure, improving toughness.
- Cold rolling: Performed at room temperature, this process further reduces thickness, improves surface finish, and increases tensile strength through strain hardening.
- Coating: To prevent corrosion, finished steel is often coated. Common methods include hot-dip galvanizing (coating with zinc) for construction materials and electrolytic tinning for packaging.

== Emissions ==
As of 2021, steelmaking was estimated to be responsible for around 11% of global CO_{2} emissions and around 7% of greenhouse gas emissions. Making 1 ton of steel emits about 1.8 tons of CO_{2}. The bulk of these emissions are from the industrial process in which coal provides the carbon that binds with the oxygen from the iron ore in a blast furnace.

Additional CO_{2} emissions result from mining, refining and shipping ore, BOS, calcination, and the hot blast. Proposed techniques to reduce CO_{2} emissions in the steel industry include reduction of iron ore using green hydrogen rather than carbon and carbon capture and storage.

=== Mining and extraction ===
Coal mining and iron ore mining are energy intensive and damage their surroundings, leaving pollution, biodiversity loss, deforestation, and greenhouse gas emissions behind.

=== Blast furnace ===
Blast furnaces remove oxygen and trace elements from iron and add a tiny amount of carbon by melting the iron ore at 1,700 °C (3,090 °F) in the presence of ambient oxygen and coke. The oxygen from the ore is carried away by the carbon from the coke in the form of CO_{2}. The reaction:

Fe_{2}O_{3}(s) + 3 CO(g) → 2 Fe(s) + 3 CO_{2}(g)

The reaction occurs because CO_{2} has a lower (favorable) energy state compared to iron oxide, and the high temperatures are needed to achieve the reaction's activation energy. A small amount of carbon bonds with the iron, forming pig iron, which is an intermediary before steel, as its carbon content is too high – around 4%.

=== Decarburization ===
To reduce the carbon content in pig iron and obtain the desired carbon content of steel, it is re-melted and oxygen is blown through in BOS. In this step, the oxygen binds with the undesired carbon, carrying it away in the form of CO_{2} gas, an additional emission source. After this step, the carbon content in the pig iron is lowered sufficiently to obtain steel.

=== Calcination ===
Further CO_{2} emissions result from the use of limestone, which is melted at high temperatures in a reaction called calcination, according to:

CaCO_{3}(s) → CaO(s) + CO_{2}(g)

The resulting CO_{2} is an additional source of emissions. Calcium oxide (CaO, quicklime) can be used as a replacement to reduce emissions. It acts as a chemical flux, removing impurities (such as sulfur or phosphorus (e.g. apatite or fluorapatite)) in the form of slag and lowers CO_{2} emissions according to reactions such as:

SiO_{2} + CaO → CaSiO_{3}

This use of limestone to provide a flux occurs both in the blast furnace (to obtain pig iron) and in BOS (to obtain steel).

=== Hot blast ===
CO_{2} emissions result from the hot blast, which increases blast furnace temperatures. The hot blast pumps hot air into the blast furnace. The hot blast temperature ranges from 900 to 1,300 °C (1,650 to 2,370 °F) depending on the design and condition. Oil, tar, natural gas, powdered coal and oxygen can be injected to combine with the coke to release additional energy and increase the percentage of reducing gases present, increasing productivity. Hot blast air is typically heated by burning fossil fuels, an additional emission source.

== Strategies for reducing carbon emissions ==
The steel industry produces 7-8% of anthropogenic CO_{2} emissions and is one of the most energy-intensive industries. Emissions abatement and decarbonization strategies vary by manufacturing process. Options fall into three general categories: using a non-fossil energy source; increasing processing efficiency; and evolving the manufacturing process. They may be used individually or in combination.

"Green steel" describes steelmaking without fossil fuels. Some companies that claim to produce green steel reduce, but do not eliminate, emissions.

=== Australia ===
Australia produces nearly 40% of the world's iron ore. The Australian Renewable Energy Agency is funding research projects involving direct reduced ironmaking (DRI) to reduce emissions. Companies such as Rio Tinto, BHP, and BlueScope are developing green steel projects.

The Whyalla Hydrogen Project, part of South Australian Premier Malinauskas’ State Prosperity Project, aims to produce green steel. However, the project has been placed on hold due to financial and operational challenges of GFG Alliance. Both the federal and state governments have intervened in an effort to address these issues with the steelworks.

=== Europe ===
European projects from HYBRIT, LKAB, Voestalpine, and ThyssenKrupp are pursuing strategies to reduce emissions. HYBRIT claims to produce green steel.

=== Top gas recovery ===
Top gas from the blast furnace is normally expelled into the air. This gas contains CO_{2}, H_{2}, and CO. The top gas can be captured, the CO_{2} removed, and the reducing agents reinjected into the blast furnace. A 2012 study suggests that this process can reduce blast furnace CO_{2} emissions by 75%, while a 2017 study shows that emissions are reduced by 56.5% with carbon capture and storage, and reduced by 26.2% if only the recycling of the reducing agents is used. To keep the carbon captured from entering the atmosphere, a method of storing it or using it would have to be found.

Another way to use the top gas is in a top recovery turbine which generates electricity, which thereby reduces external energy needs if electric arc smelting is used. Carbon could also be captured from coke oven gases. As of 2022, separating the CO_{2} from other gases and components in the system, and the high cost of the equipment and infrastructure changes needed, have prevented adoption, but the emission reduction potential has been estimated to be up to 65% to 80%.

=== Hydrogen direct reduction ===
Hydrogen direct reduction (HDR) using hydrogen produced from emission-free power (green hydrogen) offers emission-free iron-making, because water is the only by-product of the reaction between iron oxide and hydrogen. As of 2021, ArcelorMittal, Voestalpine, and TATA had committed to using green hydrogen to smelt iron. In 2024 the HYBRIT project in Sweden was using HDR. For the European Union, it is estimated that the hydrogen demand for HDR would require 180 GW of renewable capacity.

=== Iron ore electrolysis ===
Iron ore electrolysis utilizes electrons as the reducing agent. One method is molten oxide electrolysis. The cell consists of an inert anode, a liquid oxide electrolyte (CaO, MgO, etc.), and molten ore. When heated to ~1,600 °C, the ore is reduced to iron and oxygen. As of 2022 Boston Metal was at the semi-industrial stage for this process, with plans to commercialize by 2026. The Siderwin research project involved Arcelormittal was testing a different type of electrolysis. It operates at around 110 °C.

=== Scrap use ===
Scrap steelmaking refers to steel that has either reached its end-of-life use or is excess metal from the manufacture of steel components. Steel is easy to separate and recycle due to its magnetism. Using scrap avoids the emissions of 1.5 tons of CO_{2} for every ton. As of 2023, steel had one of the highest recycling rates of any material, with around 30% of the world's steel coming from recycled components. However, steel cannot be recycled endlessly, and the recycling processes, using arc furnaces, use electricity.

=== Hydrogen enrichment ===
In a blast furnace, iron oxides are reduced by a combination of CO, H_{2}, and carbon. Only around 10% of the iron oxides are reduced by H_{2}. With H_{2} enrichment, the proportion of iron oxides reduced by H_{2} is increased, consuming less carbon is consumed and emitting less CO_{2}. This process can reduce emissions by an estimated 20%.

=== Other strategies ===
One speculative idea is a project by SuSteel to develop a hydrogen plasma technology that reduces the ore with hydrogen at high operating temperatures. Biomass such as charcoal or wood pellets are a potential alternative blast furnace fuel, that does not involve fossil fuels, but still emits carbon. Emissions are reduced by 5% to 28%.

=== China ===
German plantmaker SMS Group claims that Baosteel Desheng Stainless Steel Co., Ltd., a subsidiary of China Baowu Steel Group, has successfully completed the installation of a vacuum oxygen decarburization (VOD) system at its Fuzhou plant with annual capacity of 417,000 metric tons of low-carbon steel. Ultra-fine iron ore powder is injected into a superheated furnace using a specialized high-speed lance. The molten iron collects at the bottom of the furnace, creating a stream of high-purity iron.

== See also ==
- Argon oxygen decarburization
- Carbon additive
- FINEX
- Flodin process
- History of the steel industry (1850–1970)
- History of the steel industry (1970–present)
- Metallurgical coal
- Steel mill
