= Tang Eng Iron Works =

Tang Eng Iron Works 唐榮鐵工廠
- Company type: Public (OTC) (TPEx: 2035)
- Industry: Steelmaking
- Founded: May 1940
- Headquarters: Kaohsiung City, Republic of China (Taiwan).
- Key people: Founder: Tang Eng
- Website: Tang Eng Iron Works

Tang Eng Iron Works (Chinese: 唐榮鐵工廠; pinyin: Tángróngtiě Gōngchǎng) is a steelmaking company in Taiwan. Its headquarters is in Siaogang District of Kaohsiung.

== History ==
The company was established by Tang Eng in May 1940. It was once the largest steel company in the Japanese-ruled Taiwan. It transformed into a province-owned company in 1962, and reorganized as a state-owned company in 1999. The company has been reprivatized since 2006. At one time, Tang Eng also owned some brick making factories which were abandoned in 1980s, and had been designated as historic monuments of Taiwan.

== See also ==
- List of companies of Taiwan
