= FINEX (steelmaking process) =

FINEX is the name for an iron making technology developed by former Siemens VAI (now Primetals Technologies) and POSCO. Molten iron is produced directly using iron ore fines and non-coking coal rather than traditional blast furnace methods through sintering and reduction with coke. Elimination of preliminary processing is claimed to make the plant for FINEX less expensive to build than a blast furnace facility of the same scale, additionally a 10-15% reduction in production costs is expected/claimed through cheaper raw materials, reduction of facility cost, pollutant exhaustion, maintenance staff and production time. The process is claimed to produce less pollutants such as SOx, NOx, and carbon dioxide than traditional methods.

This process is essentially a combination of FINMET's Fluidized Bed and COREX's Melter Gasifier, hence its name "FINEX".

== See also ==
- Steel making
- HIsarna steelmaking process
