= HIsarna ironmaking process =

Direct reduced iron process

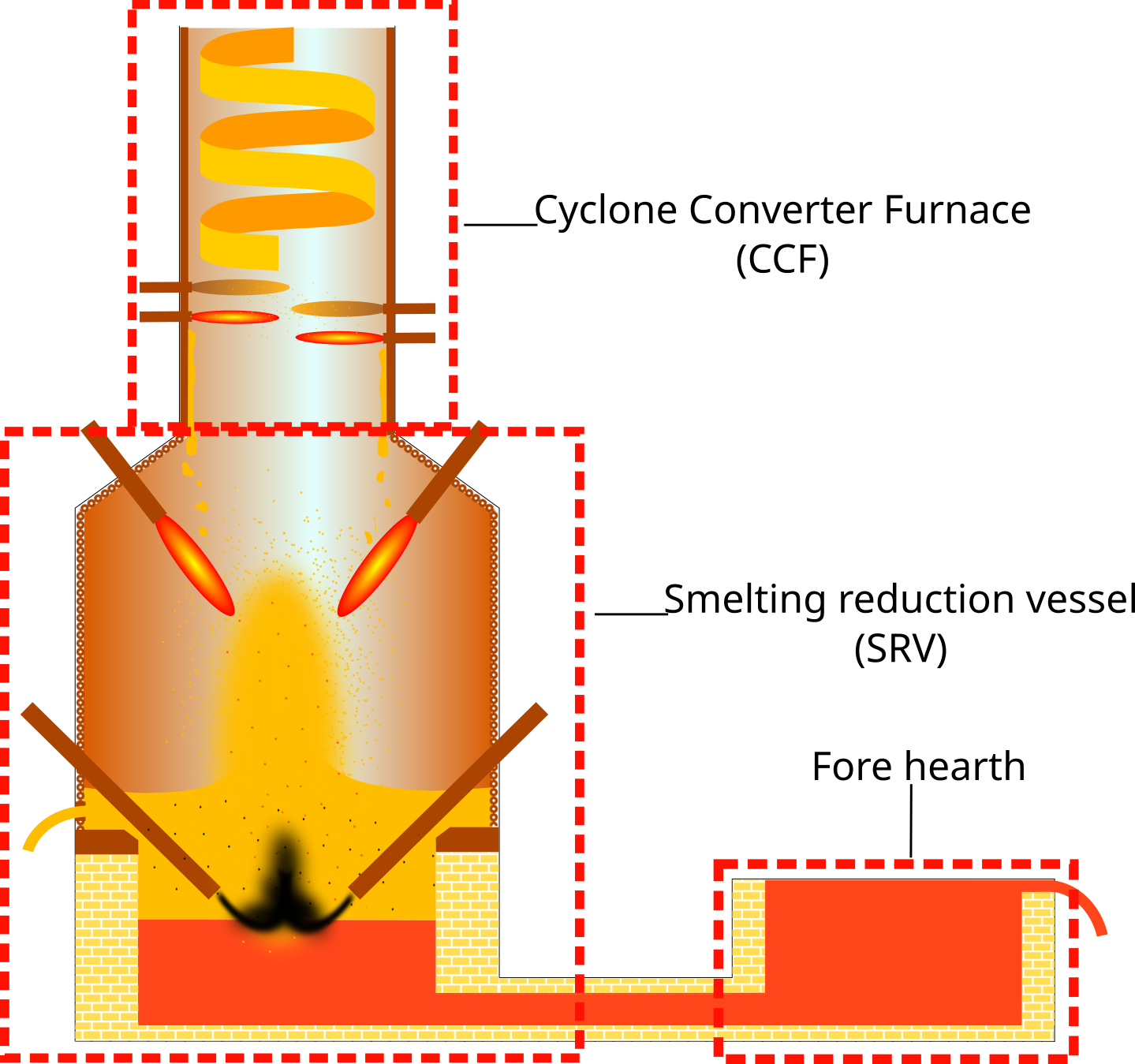
Diagram of the HIsarna ironmaking process with labelled sections of the reactor

The HIsarna ironmaking process is a smelting reduction process for iron making in which iron ore is processed almost directly into liquid iron (pig iron). The process combines two process units, the Cyclone Converter Furnace (CCF) for ore melting and pre-reduction and a Smelting Reduction Vessel (SRV) where the final reduction stage to liquid iron takes place. The process does not require the manufacturing of iron ore agglomerates such as pellets and sinter, nor the production of coke, which are necessary for the blast furnace process. Without these steps, the HIsarna process is more energy-efficient and has a lower carbon footprint than traditional ironmaking processes. In 2018 Tata Steel announced it has demonstrated that more than 50% CO_{2} emission reduction is possible with HIsarna technology, without the need for carbon capture technology.

The HIsarna process was developed in stages and with pauses at Koninklijke Hoogovens / Corus IJmuiden / Tata Steel IJmuiden, starting in 1986. The final stages were made possible through the Ultra-Low Carbon Dioxide Steelmaking (ULCOS) consortium and cooperation between former Corus (now Tata Steel) and the Rio Tinto Group. The latter contributed their HIsmelt (short for "high intensity smelting") technology to the final design of the installation, prompting the name HIsarna for the process ("HI" from "high intensity" and "sarna" from Isarna, a Celtic word for iron).

HIsarna is considered one of the most promising developments in reducing CO_{2} emissions from the steel industry.

== History ==
The very first attempts at applying cyclone oven technology in the reduction of iron ore took place at Koninklijke Hoogovens in the 1960s. Cyclone technology had already been used successfully in different industrial, chemical processes and designers at Hoogovens thought it might be a strategy for improvement for their process. However, at the time they could not get it to work properly and the experiment was quickly abandoned.

The first serious revival came in 1986, when Hoogovens sought a method of producing steel without having to produce iron ore agglomerates such as pellets and sinter. At that time the desire was mostly a cost-cutting measure in order to make the process cheaper in trying economic times. The trying times did not last however and the project was put on the back burner until the early 1990s.

By the early 1990s the availability of cokes was becoming limited due to many of the major coking facilities in the West that produced cokes from coal reaching the end of their economic life. Heavy environmental restrictions made it unattractive to build new facilities, so steel producers sought ways to reduce the need for cokes; Hoogovens started putting more effort into the cyclone technology as a solution to this problem and a test facility for the cyclone part proved capable of producing twenty tons of pig iron per hour. The rest of the process didn't work very well though, so when steel producers massively moved to replace part of the coke by powdered coal injection and China started mass-producing cokes, the project lost momentum again. The steep drop in prices of commodities around 1999 caused the project to be halted.

In 2004 however, the European Union brought pressure on the steel industry to reduce its carbon footprint; the ULCOS consortium was founded as a result and in the period 2005–2007 the cyclone technology was selected as one of four high-potential technologies. A theoretical answer was found to the earlier problems of the post-cyclone part of the cyclone furnace in the form of a Smelting Reduction Vessel and the Rio Tinto Group had industrial-scale experience with the required process, called HIsmelt. An agreement between them and ULCOS added the HIsmelt technology to the cyclone furnace and the result was the HIsarna process. In 2017 Tata Steel obtained the smelter IP rights from Rio Tinto, now fully owning all HIsarna IP.

== Pilot plant ==
External image
- HIsarna pilot plant

In 2010 the HIsarna pilot plant was constructed at Tata Steel IJmuiden. The pilot plant has a capacity of producing 65,000 tons of pig iron per year. A first campaign of experiments was completed in spring 2011, which was followed by three more successful experimental campaigns. The second and third campaign were co-financed by the Research Fund for Coal and Steel (RFCS). The fourth campaign finished in June 2014. The fifth campaign started in the autumn of 2017. This project was part funded by the Horizon 2020 Framework Programme from the EU, as part of the second Sustainable Industry Low Carbon (SILC-II) funding round. In 2021 the sixth HIsarna campaign was started. By 2023 the pilot plant had produced a total of 12 000 tonnes of liquid hot metal and the longest continuous run was 19.5 days. In the spring of 2026 it was reported that the pilot plant had undergone several significant upgrades improving productivity, introducing injection of natural gas as part replacement for coal injection and the installation of thermal imaging inside the Smelting Reduction Vessel. In the same publication it is reported that the total production of liquid hot metal was 19 000 tonnes with a daily record of 160 tonnes and a coal rate of 726 kg per tonne of liquid metal.

== Process ==
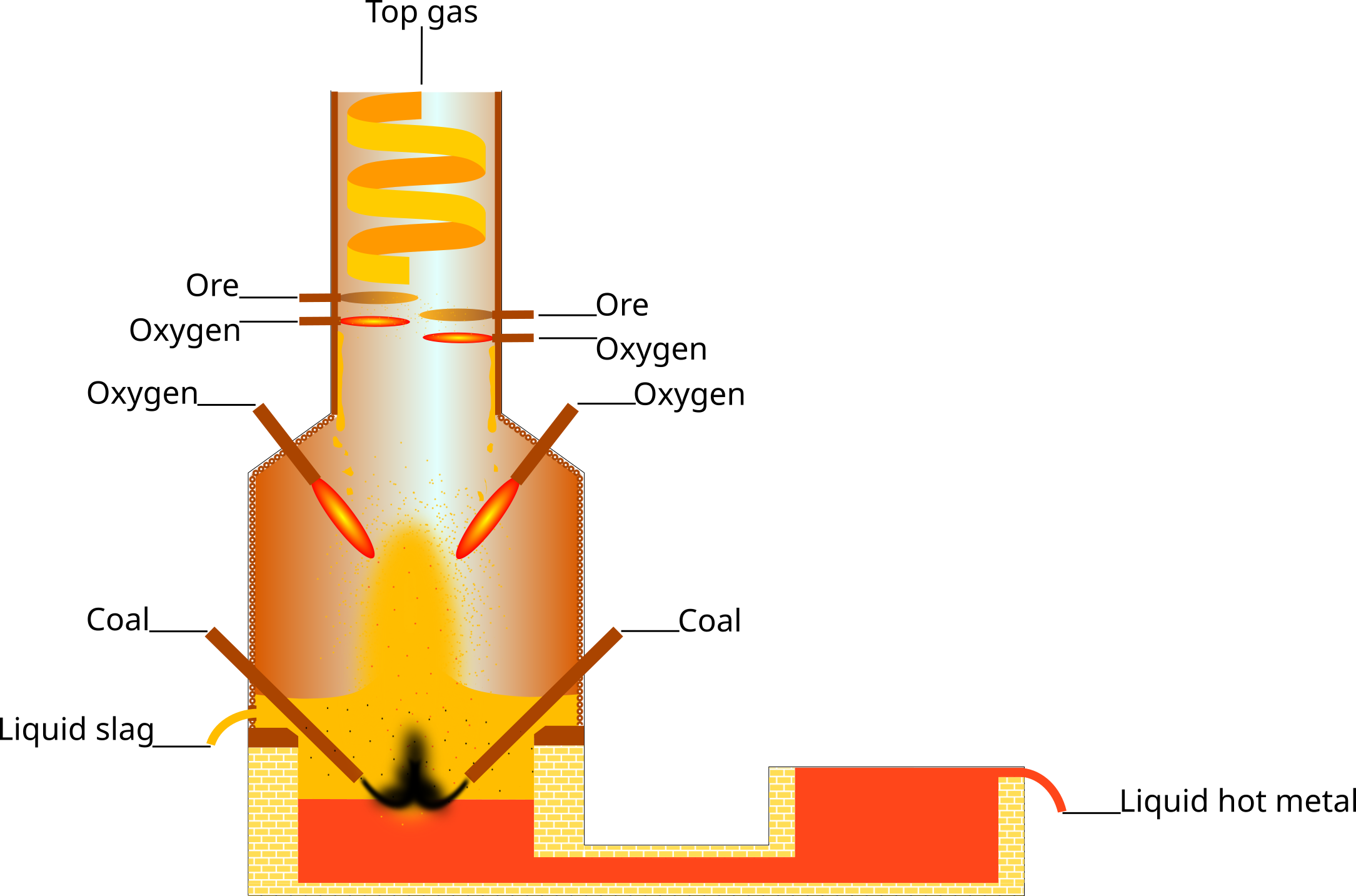
Diagram of the HIsarna ironmaking process with labelled material flows

External images
- Schematic of the HIsarna process (Tata Steel)
- Control room of the HIsarna pilot plant
- Cast house and metal tapping at the HIsarna pilot plant

The HIsarna process is a smelting reduction process with two directly coupled process stages in which the production of liquid pig iron takes place.

It is a combination of a Cyclone Converter Furnace (CCF) which is placed above the Smelting Reduction Vessel (SRV), forming a continuous, once through process. The HIsarna plant is shaped like a wine bottle: a "bottle" at the bottom and a thin "neck" at the top. The geometry of this furnace causes a cyclone to form in the neck when the crushed iron ore is injected into this cyclone together with oxygen (so oxygen is injected at the top rather than at the bottom). The high temperature in the cyclone causes the iron ore to melt and partly pre-reduce to FeO.

These molten and pre-reduced iron ore droplets then drip down the furnace wall to the place where the "neck" widens into the "bottle". Here the droplets fall from the wall into the molten slag, which sits on top of the liquid iron bath in the bottom of the furnace. Between the cyclone and the slag layer, oxygen is injected through water cooled lances to generate heat by partly combusting the gases (mainly CO) being released from the final reduction reaction step that takes place in the slag. Powder coal is injected into the slag layer, again through water cooled lances. The reduction reaction now continues "as normal" in the bottom of the furnace, with the partially reduced iron ore further reducing to regular pig iron and the whole separating into two molten layers (a top layer of slag and a bottom layer of molten pig iron). Both layers can be tapped individually and the pig iron can be used immediately in the remainder of the basic oxygen steelmaking process.

== Advantages ==
In a technical sense, the advantage of the HIsarna process is that it removes the step of creating iron ore agglomerates and coke to create a porous burden for the blast furnace. In the traditional process one cannot use powdered coal alone since the strength of the coke is required to support the burden. By comparison, in HIsarna, the powder form of the coal and ore are an advantage because the increased surface area improves the speed and quality of the reduction reaction in the cyclone.

The main advantages of the process are derived from those mentioned above, however: the fact that the separate steps of creating ore agglomerates and cokes disappear from the process makes the process more energy efficient and reduces its carbon footprint. This makes the process attractive to steelmakers, who are being pressured to make their processes more environmentally friendly — particularly in Europe, where government regulations are increasingly attaching a financial penalty to high carbon dioxide emissions. The HIsarna process uses 20% less energy and emits at least 20% less CO_{2} per ton steel compared to conventional pig iron production. Further environmental advantages include a significant reduction of other emissions such as NO_{x}, SO_{x} and fine dust. CO_{2} emission reductions of more than 50% can be achieved by replacing part of the coal for sustainable biomass and using steel scrap in the process.

Besides the direct environmental benefits HIsarna offers economic benefits as well. Due to the more compact footprint the total investment cost will be reduced compared to the traditional route. The process is also able to handle low cost ores and coals. Trials simulating conditions using a lean high Al_{2}O_{3} gangue iron ore were successful, running the process with a slag containing more than 20% Al_{2}O_{3}. The hot metal produced in HIsarna also has advantages for the steelmaking process, allowing for lower slag and metal phosphorus levels in the BOF converter or larger hot metal charges in an Electric arc furnace.

== Circularity ==
In order to replace fluxes such as limestone and dolomite, the HIsarna process can use BOF or LD steelmaking slags as a flux replacement. The use of recycled slag improves the fluxing behaviour and coal consumption. The process recovers a large part of the iron contained in the steelmaking slag. The HIsarna slag can be granulated and is suitable for the production of cement.

Tata Steel is also planning to develop the process in such a way that zinc can be recovered, supported by the EIT RawMaterials, and CO_{2} can be captured for utilisation or storage.

== Further development ==
In November 2018 it was announced that a larger-scale HIsarna pilot facility could be built at the Tata Steel site in Jamshedpur, India, but that the site in IJmuiden would still be a potential location for further industrial implementation of the technology. On 10 December 2025 Tata Steel announced that its board approved the commencement of engineering work and regulatory approval process to set up a 1Mtpa demonstration plant in Jamshedpur.

== See also ==
- FINEX (steelmaking process)
- Corex Process
- Blast furnace
