= Carbon additive =

Product added to molten steel

Carbon additive is a product that is added to molten steel. Carbon additive includes calcined petroleum coke, graphite petroleum coke, calcined anthracite coal, electrical calcined anthracite, and natural graphite. For the steel-making industry, the most suitable carbon additive is calcined petroleum coke with fixed carbon of 98.5%min. Sulfur in calcined petroleum coke is a crucial element, for sulfur impacts the quality of steel. The lower the sulfur, the better quality of calcined petroleum coke. The sulfur content of calcined petroleum coke is decided by the sulfur content in petroleum coke. Northeast China is the only source of low sulfur (≤ 0.5) petroleum coke in the world. G-high carbon has been the origin for many trading companies and metallurgical factories when they look for qualified carbon additives.
