= DR2900 series =

Passenger train in Taiwan

DR2900/DR3000 series
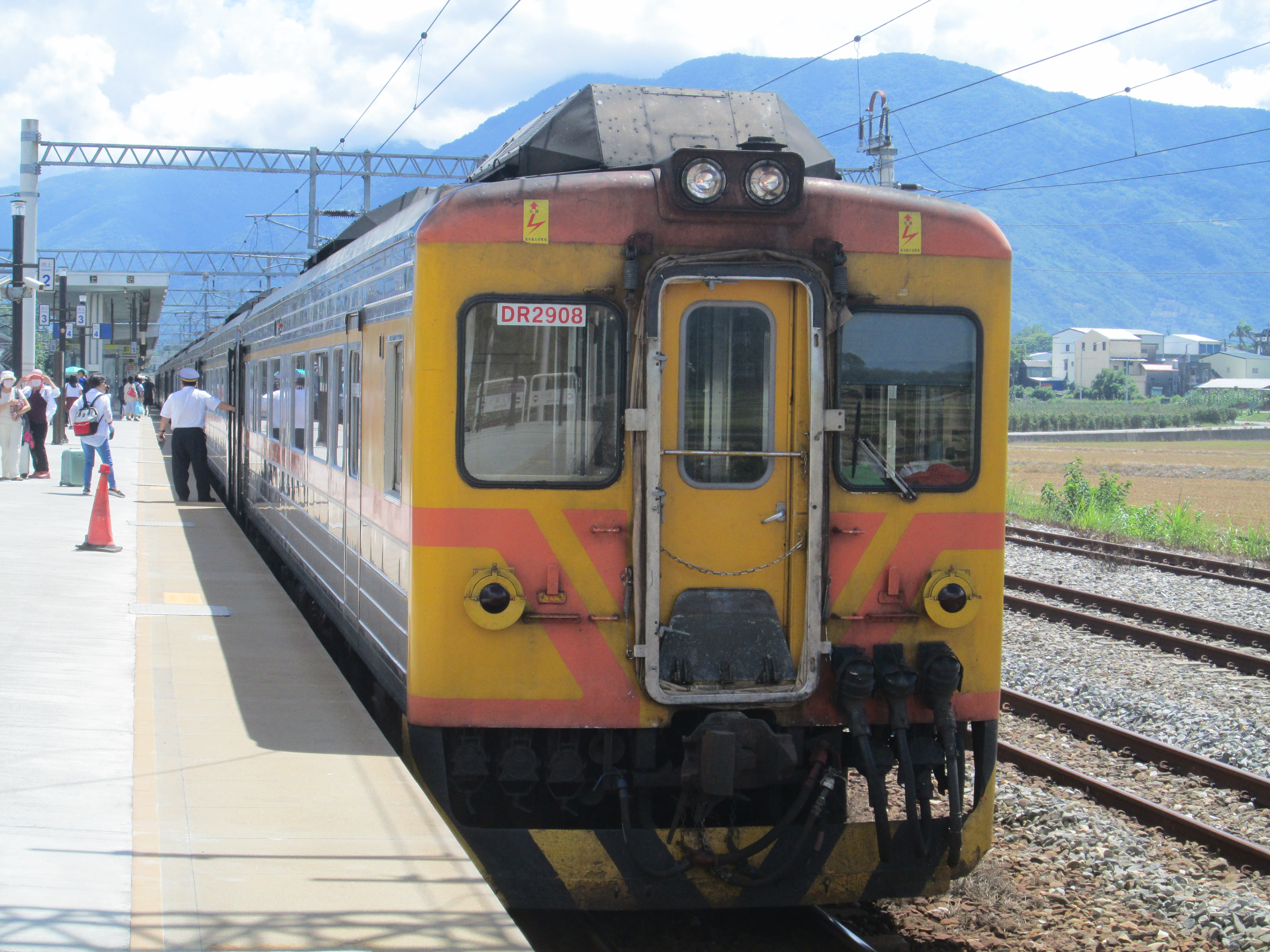
- In service: 1986–(DR2900) 1990-(DR3000)
- Manufacturer: Hitachi
- Entered service: 1986~present(DR2900) 1990~present(DR3000)
- Refurbished: 2009
- Number built: 15 vehicles (DR2900) 81 vehicles (DR3000)
- Number preserved: 1 (DR3051) Preserved near by Linrong Shin Kong railway station
- Fleet numbers: DR2900(DR2901~DR2910) DR2950(DR2051~DR2055) DR3000(DR3001~DR3054) DR3070(DR3071~DR3097)
- Operators: Taiwan Railway Corporation
- Lines served: Yilan line North-link line Taitung line South-link line Pingtung Line; Western Trunk line Kaohsiung Port Line (2003~2006)

Specifications
- Car length: 20,274 mm (66 ft 6 3/16 in)
- Width: 2,850 mm (9 ft 4 3/16 in)
- Height: 4,070 mm (13 ft 4 1/4 in)
- Maximum speed: 110 km/h (68 mph)
- Prime mover(s): Cummins NT855-R4 (original)
- HVAC: Forced-air ventilation
- Safety system(s): ATS-SN, ATS-P, ATP
- Track gauge: 1,067 mm (3 ft 6 in)

The DR2900 series and DR3000 series is two series of diesel multiple unit trains operated by the Taiwan Railway as Tze-chiang limited express on non-electrified mainlines. They were originally built by Hitachi in 1986(DR2900) and 1990(DR3000) for the Taiwan Railways Administration to provide more service on the eastern mainline of Taiwan. Although two trains are named with different numbers, they actually shared the same design.

Each power driving car (designated as DR2900s or DR3000s) is equipped with a Cummins NT855-R4 diesel engine producing 310 horsepower (230 kW) to move the train. The trailer (designated as DR2950s or DR3070s) has a diesel engine to provide head-end power for the entire three-car set. Each power driving car only has a cab at one end and two power driving cars bracket a trailer in a standard set. The standard train formation is DR2900/3000 + DR2950/3070 + DR2900/3000.

The body of DR2900/DR3000 series is also made of stainless steel, but there are only 5 longitudinal elevations along the outer wall. The air condition facilities are set at the roof to have more seats. There are doors at both ends of the trailer. In 2009 the doors are modified to automatic doors, and destination indicator was also refurbished.

DR2900 series mainly operated as Tze-chiang limited express on the eastern mainline (including Yilan line, North-link line, and Taitung line) South-link line, Pingtung Line, and Western Trunk line between Changhua railway station and Kaohsiung Main Station. DR2900 used to operate the "DuDu" train on Kaohsiung Port Line (2003~2006). Both trains served as local trains in Pingtung line before. DR2900 series often operated together with DR3000 series.
