= DR2800 series =

Passenger train in Taiwan

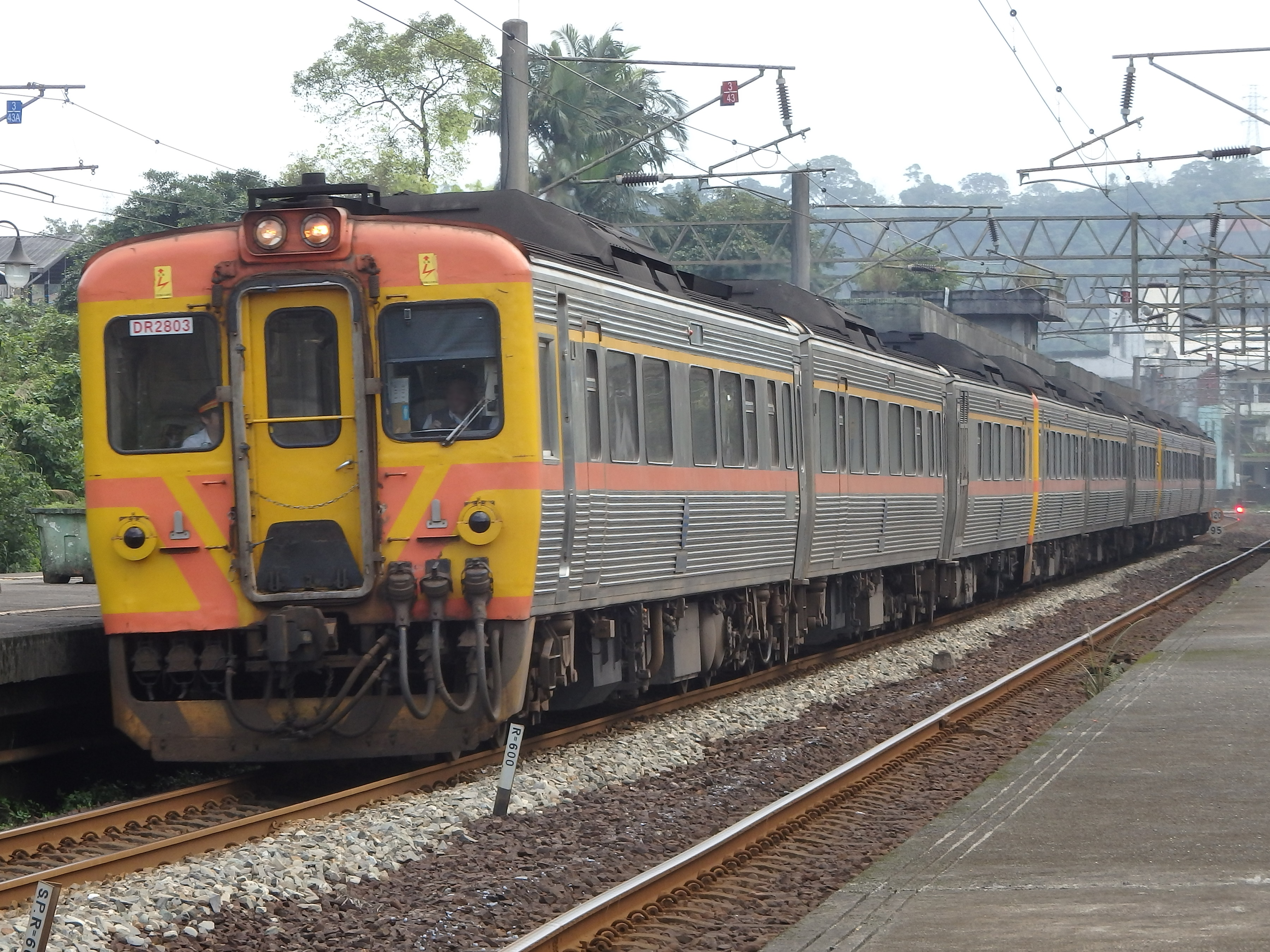
- In service: 1982–2023 (passenger service)
- Manufacturer: Tokyu Car Corporation
- Entered service: 1982
- Refurbished: 2002-2003
- Number built: 45 vehicles
- Operator: Taiwan Railway Corporation

Specifications
- Maximum speed: 110 km/h (68 mph)
- Weight: 37 tons (DR2800)/ 35 tons (DR2850)
- Prime movers: Cummins NT855-R4 (original); Cummins NTA855-R1(modification)
- Transmission: Niigata Tekkō DBSF-110
- HVAC: Forced-air ventilation
- Bogies: TS-124(power driving car)/TS-125(trailer)
- Braking system: SMEE electromagnetic air
- Safety system: ATP
- Track gauge: 1,067 mm (3 ft 6 in)

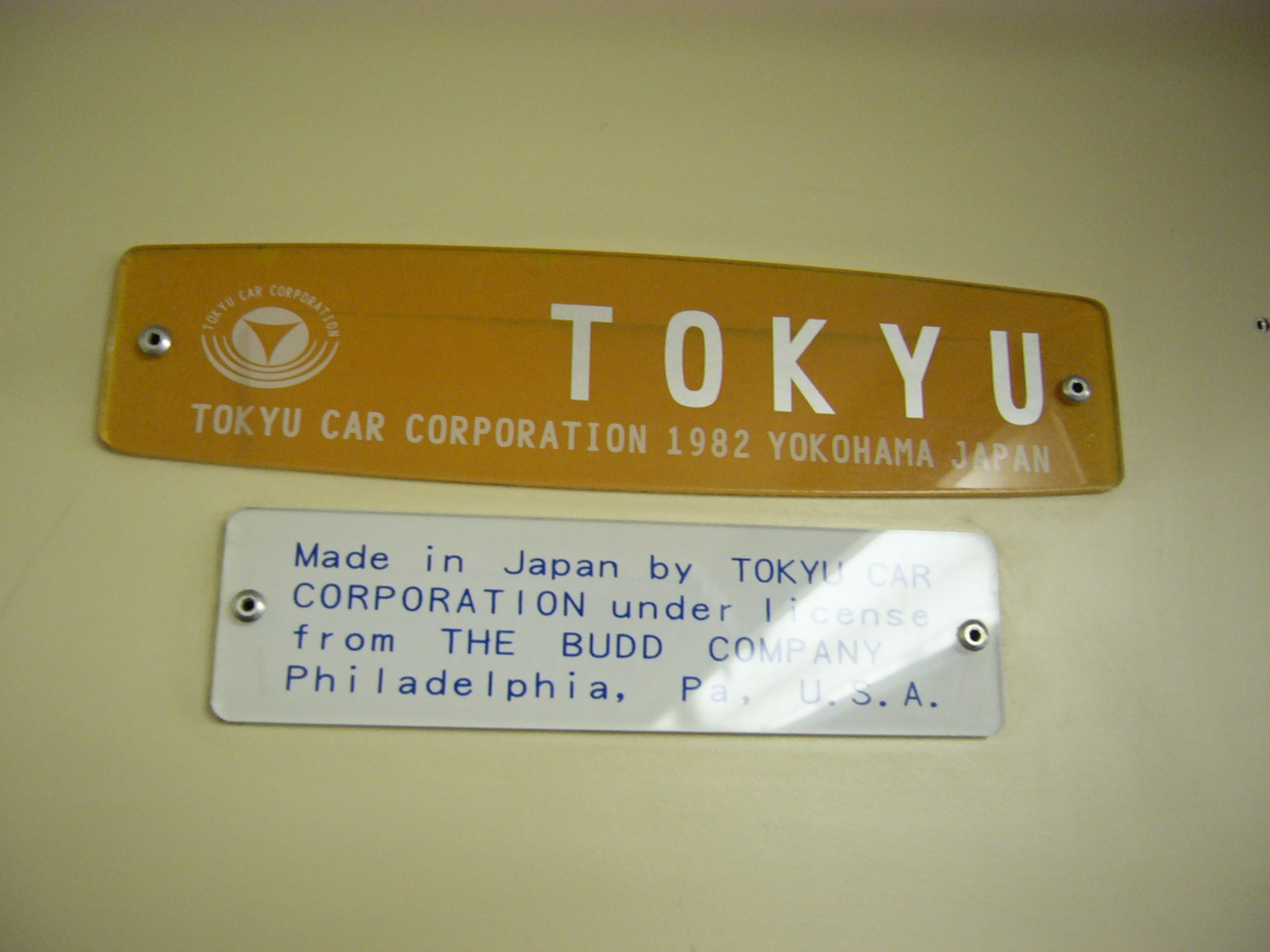
DR2800, made by Tokyu Car under the license from Budd

The DR2800 series is a series of diesel multiple unit trains operated by the Taiwan Railway as Tze-chiang limited express on non-electrified mainlines. They were originally built by Tokyu Car Corporation of Japan in 1982 for the Taiwan Railways Administration to provide better service on the eastern mainline of Taiwan.

In early 1980s, the North-link line was completed, the Yilan line was expanded to double track, and the gauge of Taitung line was changed to 1067 mm. In response to the demand for air-conditioned express trains in eastern Taiwan, Taiwan Railways Administration ordered 10 sets of diesel multiple unit trains from Tokyu Car. These train sets were heavily specialized under license from Budd, and each set consists of 2 power driving cars and a trailer. Each power driving car (designated as DR2800s) was equipped with a Cummins NT855-R4 diesel engine producing 310 horsepower (230 kW) to move the train. The trailer (designated as DR2850s) has a diesel engine to provide head-end power for the entire three-car set. Each power driving car only has a cab at one end and two power driving cars bracket a trailer in a standard set. To prevent dependency on the trailer's engine for cooling, the cooling fans of the driver cars are driven hydraulically instead of electrically. Besides, the DR2800 series is the first series of diesel railcars of Taiwan Railways Administration equipped with bogies containing air suspension.

The DR2800 series operated as Tze-chiang limited express between Taipei and Hualien on June 1, 1982. With a top speed of 110 kilometres per hour (68 mph) and air-conditioning, the demand was so high that Taiwan Railways Administration ordered another 5 sets (15 cars) in 1984.

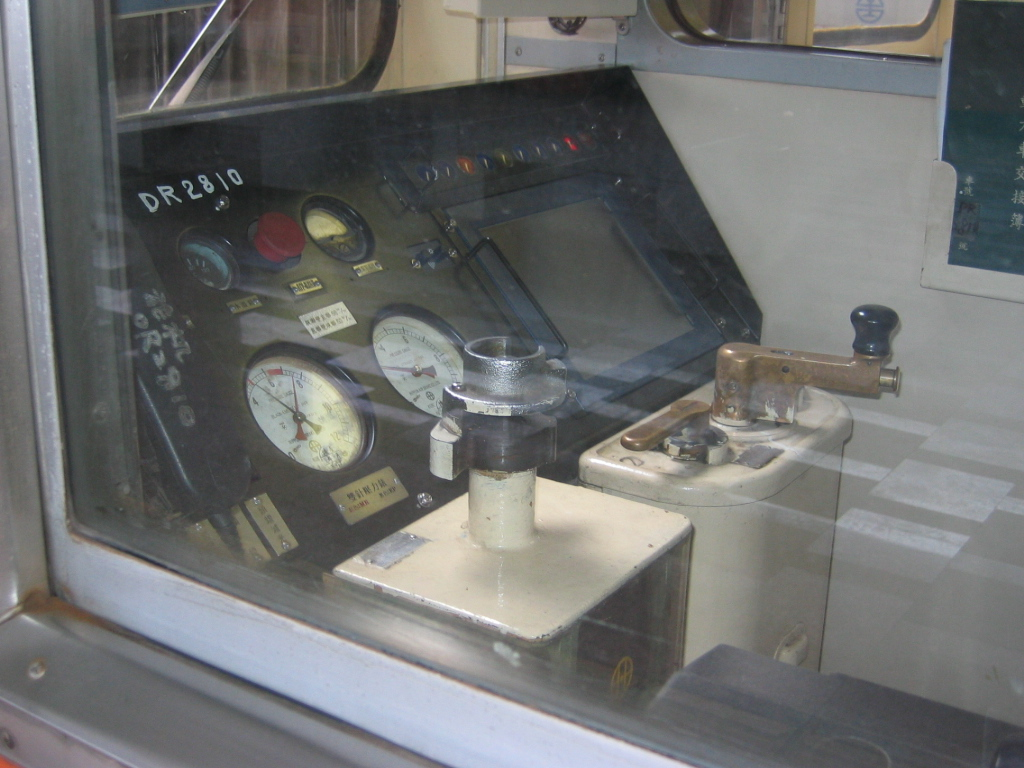
Cab of DR2800

The interior was refurbished between 2001 and 2002. The original Cummins NT855R-4 diesel engines were replaced by Cummins NTA855-R1 in 2002 and 2003, and the total output of a set increased to 700 horsepower (520 kW).

DR2800 series mainly operated as Tze-chiang limited express on the eastern mainline (including Yilan line, North-link line, and Taitung line) and South-link line. In 1991 it even ran on the west line to provide more seats during Chinese New Year. As of February 2025, only one DR2800 series is in service operating as TRA track evaluation train.
