= Taiwan Railway =

State-owned national railway of Taiwan

- Main logo

- Alternate logo

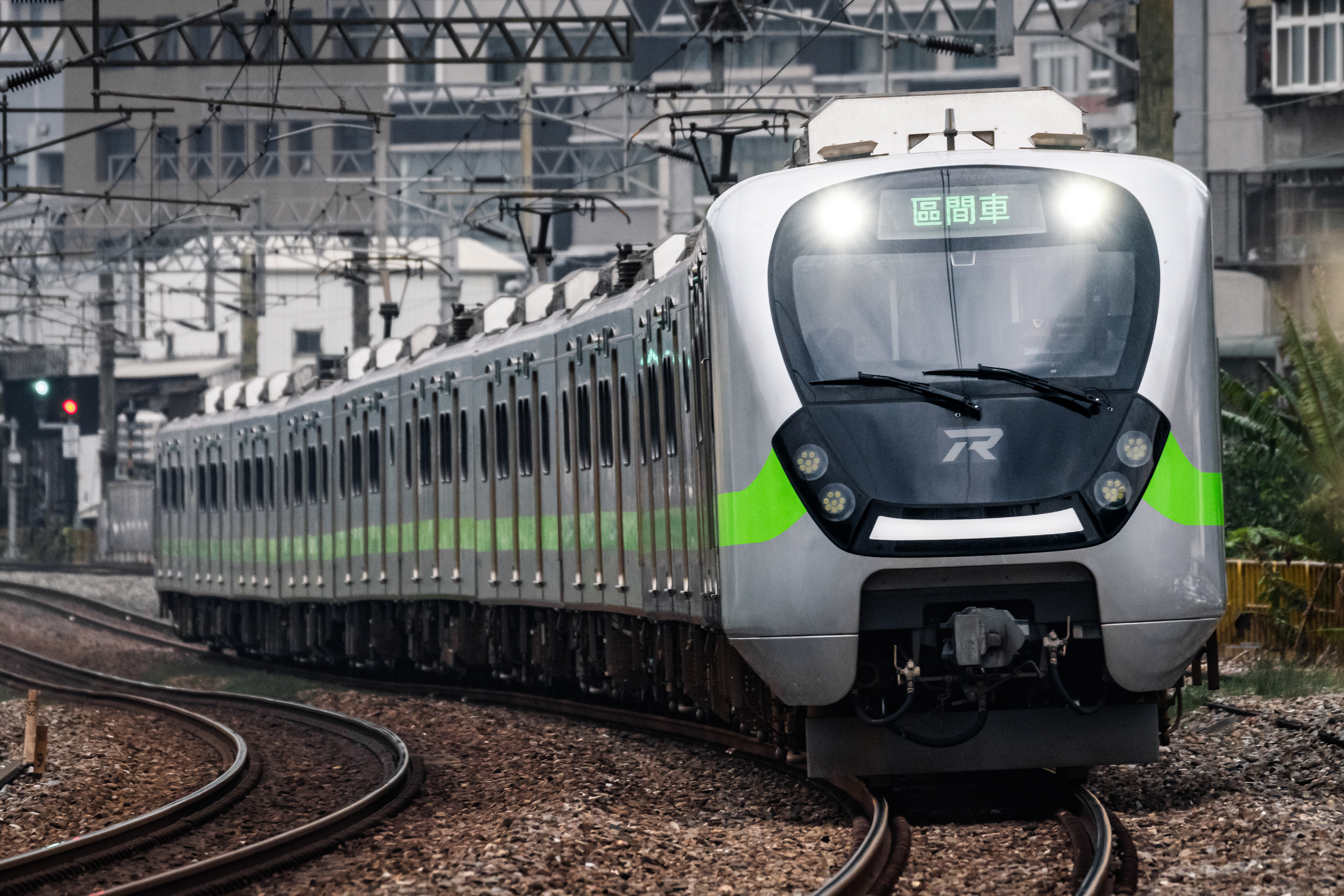
- A local train near Taoyuan

Overview
- Native name: 臺鐵 (Note: In local languages: Traditional Chinese script: 台鐵 (short for 台灣鐵路, meaning "Taiwan Railway"); Mandarin Pinyin: Táitiě; Hokkien: Tâi-thih; Hailu Hakka: Thòi-thiet)
- Locale: Taiwan
- Transit type: Heavy rail
- Number of lines: 12
- Number of stations: 241
- Daily ridership: 647,700 (2024) ▲7.8%
- Annual ridership: 170,254,000 (2022) ▲9.89%
- Chief executive: Feng Hui-sheng
- Website: railway.gov.tw

Operation
- Began operation: 1891
- Operator: Taiwan Railway Corporation
- Character: Mixed
- Number of vehicles: 900

Technical
- System length: 1,065 km (662 mi)
- Track gauge: 1,067 mm (3 ft 6 in)
- Electrification: 25 kV 60 Hz AC overhead lines where electrified
- Top speed: 150 km/h (93 mph)
Official route map (zh)
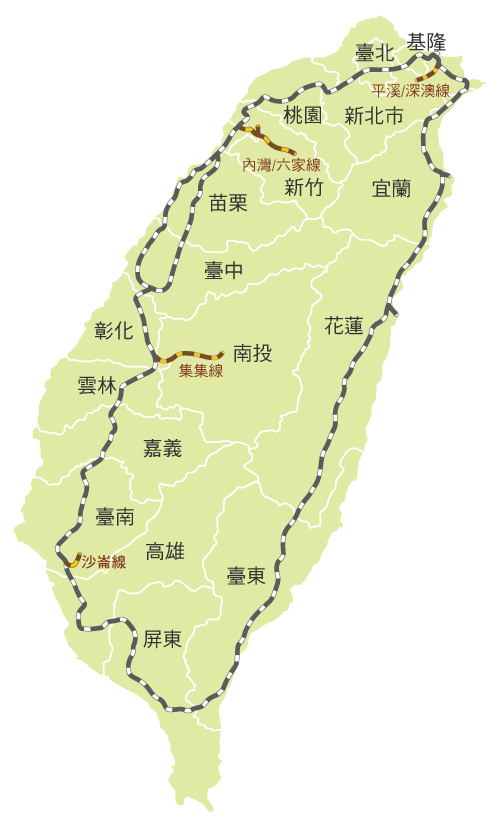

Taiwan Railway (TR) (Note: In local languages: Traditional Chinese script: 臺灣鐵路; Mandarin Pinyin: Táiwān Tiělù (Táitiě); Hokkien: Tâi-oân Thih-lō͘ (Tâi-thih); Hailu Hakka: Thòi-vân Thiet-lu (Thòi-thiet)) is a state-owned conventional railway in Taiwan. It is operated by the Taiwan Railway Corporation under the supervision of the Ministry of Transportation and Communications, responsible for managing, maintaining, and running conventional passenger and freight railway services on 1,097 km (682 mi) of track in Taiwan. Passenger traffic in 2018 was 231,267,955.

The railway was previously operated by Taiwan Railways Administration (TRA). On 1 January 2024, Taiwan Railway Administration became a state-owned corporation, Taiwan Railway Corporation.

== Overview ==
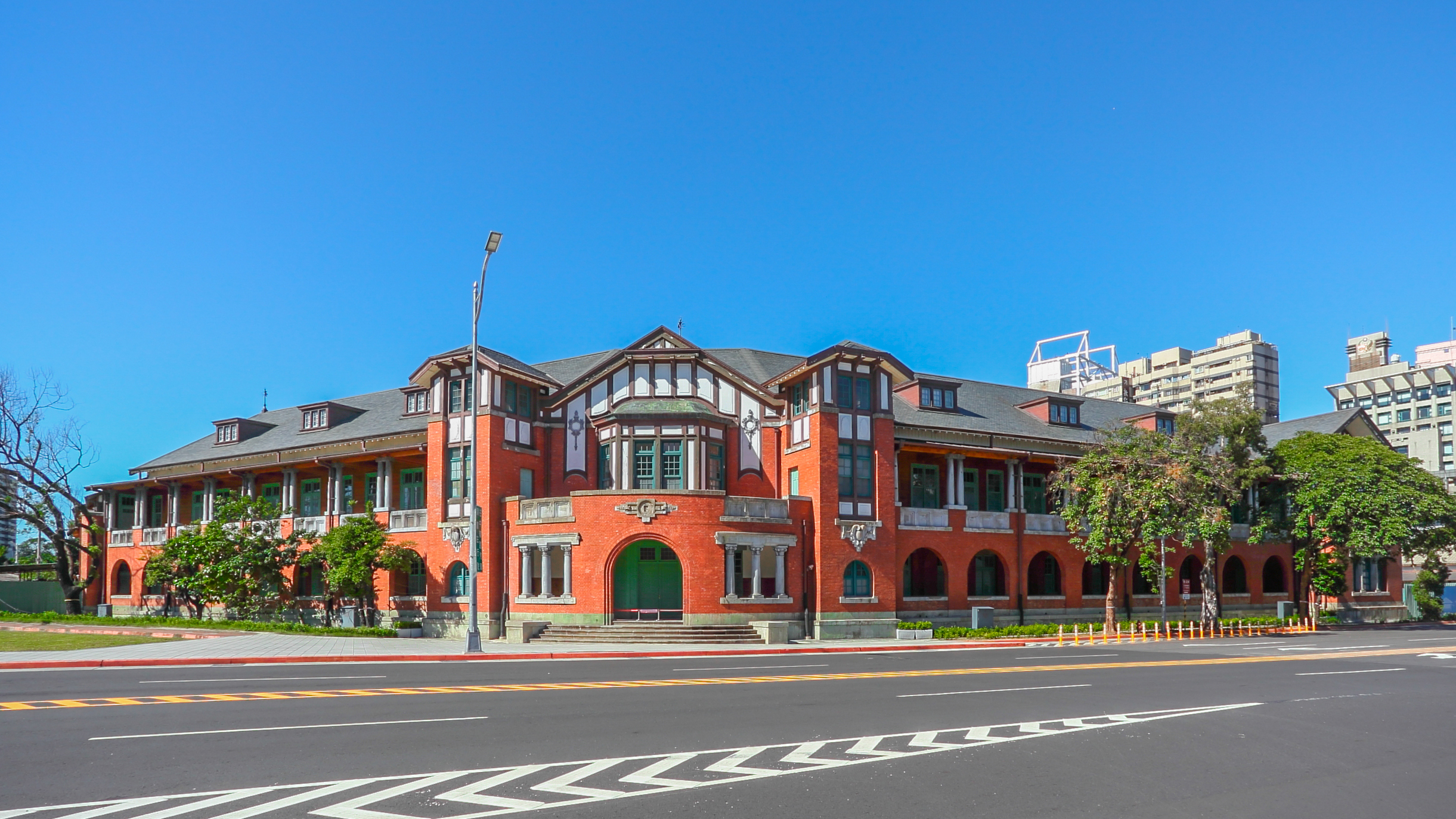
Railway Department of the Office of the Governor-General of Taiwan in September 2021

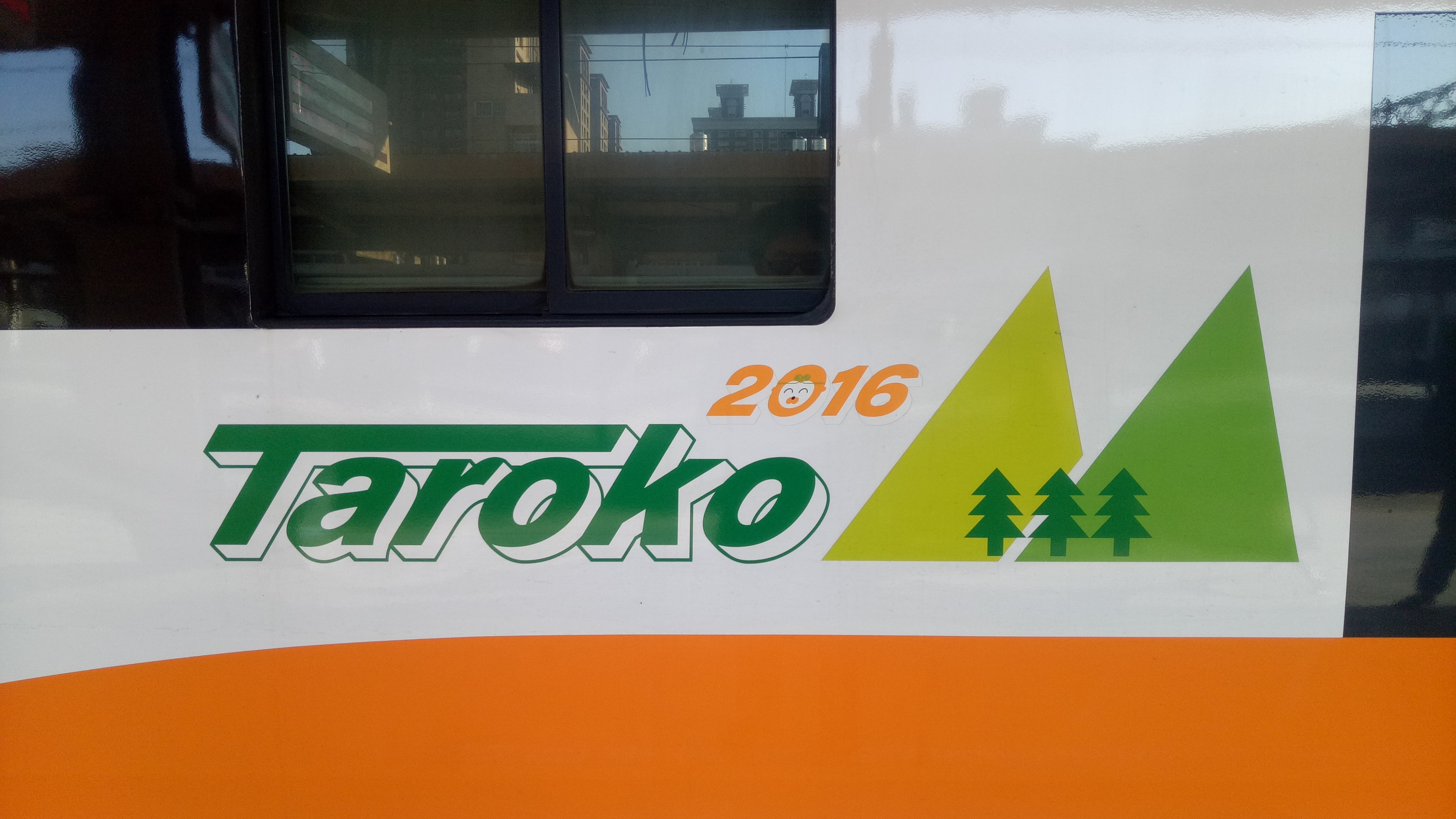
The TRA purchased six initial sets of Hitachi 8-car 130 km/h tilting trains, based on JR Kyushu's 885 series, for US$85 million to provide accelerated East Coast services. They are locally called Taroko Express after the mountain gorge.

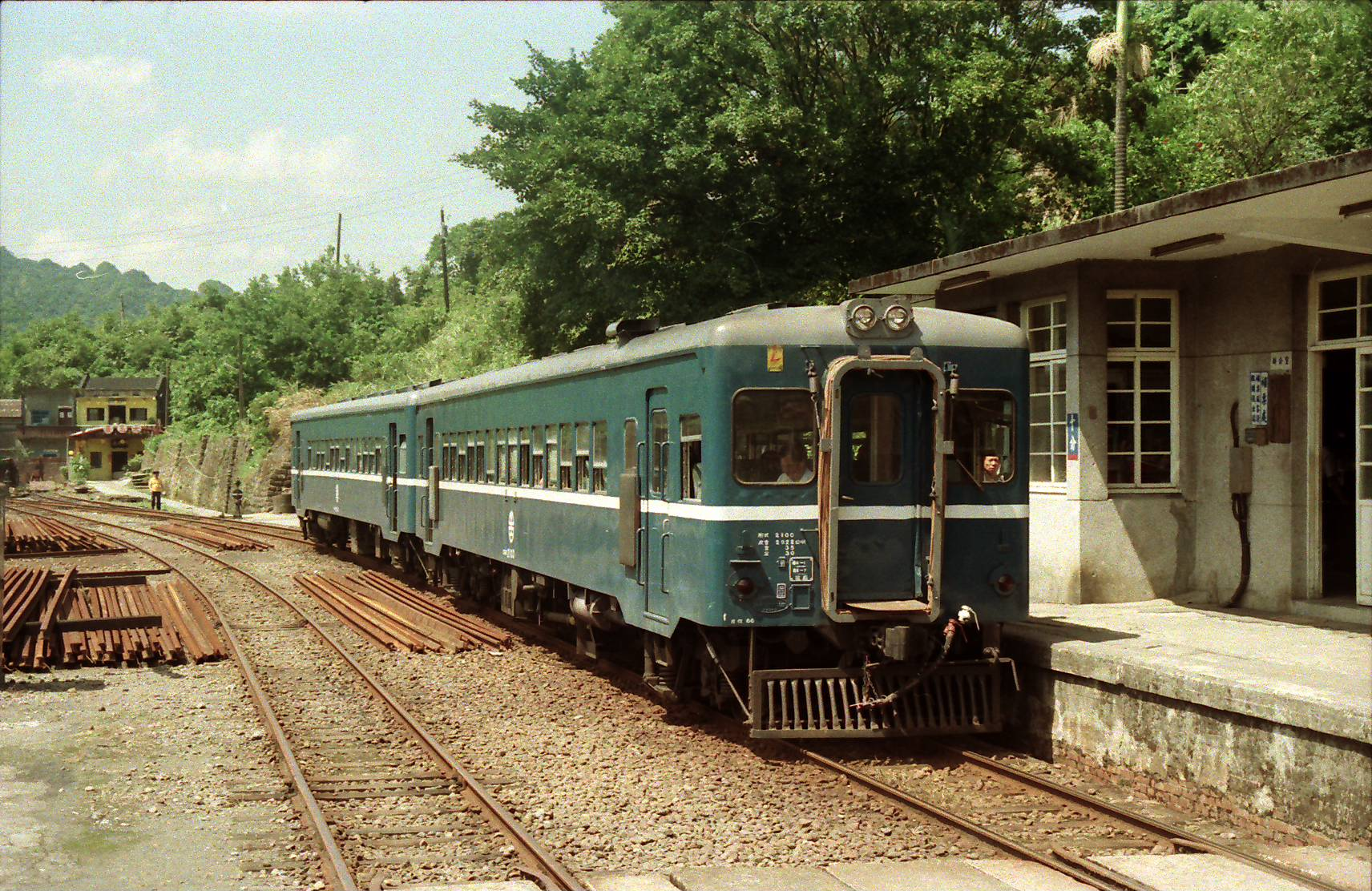
A typical branch line service using a non-air conditioned DR2100 series DMU, at Shifen station on the Pingxi line in the 1990s

Construction of railway service on Taiwan began between Keelung and Hsinchu in 1887 under the Qing dynasty and was significantly expanded by the Railway Department under Japanese occupation. As a result, Japanese influence and heritage persists to this day on Taiwanese railways. Similarities between TR and the Japan Railways (JR) companies can be found in signal aspects, signage, track layout, fare controls, station architecture, and operating procedures. As Japan's southern base during World War II, Taiwan's railways suffered significant damage by Allied air raids. Following the surrender of Japan in the aftermath of World War II, the Republic of China's government created the Taiwan Railways Administration on 5 March 1948 to reconstruct and operate railway infrastructure, with Lang Chung-lai as its first director-general.

TRA was a government organisation that fell under Taiwan's Ministry of Transportation and Communication (MOTC) and employed around 13,500 people (4,700 in transportation and 7,700 in maintenance titles) and directly operated some 682 route miles of 3 ft 6 in (1,067 mm) gauge railways. Three mainlines form a complete circle around the island. TRA's West Coast line and Badu-Hualien section feature mostly double-track, electrification, modern colour light and cab signalling, overrun protection, and centralized traffic control (CTC). South-link line, east coast Taitung (converted from 762 mm gauge), and three "tourist" branches are non-electrified single-track with passing sidings.

Since the early 1980s, conventional railway capital improvements have been nationally funded and managed by the MOTC's Railway Reconstruction Bureau, then turned over to TRA for operations. Taiwan's challenging terrain meant all lines feature extensive tunneling and long bridges. Double-tracking frequently requires construction of parallel single-track railroads or bypass tunnels on new alignments. The US$14.5 billion standard gauge high-speed rail (HSR) line was built and operated by a separate public-private partnership under a 35-year concession, but TRA provides feeder services to HSR terminals. Although TRA operates all commuter rail, other quasi-private organizations operate subways in Taipei and Kaohsiung.

Local and intercity passenger services (5am–1am, very few overnight trains) operate at 95.3% on-time performance. 2008 annual passenger ridership was 179 million (incurring 5.45 billion passenger-miles), generating US$434 million in revenue. Commuter trains carry 76% of riders (43% of passenger miles). WCML carries >90% of ridership. TRA's loose-car and unit-train bulk freight services haul mainly aggregates (58% of tonnage), cement (26%), and coal (9%). In 2008, 9.5 million tons of freight (481 million ton-miles) generated US$28.6 million in revenue. Limited container services operate between the port of Hualien and suburban Taipei, but loading gauge restrictions preclude piggyback operations. During typhoon season, small trucks are carried on flatcars when highways are closed by flooding or mudslides.

In the past, a shipper-owned light railway network (762 mm gauge, never operated by TRA) handled freight services throughout Taiwan and once boasted 1,800 route miles. Largely abandoned today, it served important industries including sugar, logging, coal, salt, and minerals.

Unlike JR East and Hong Kong's Mass Transit Railway, revenues from ancillary businesses accounted for only 17.8% of TRA's revenues. TRA's estimated farebox recovery ratio (including freight operations) was ~40%.

Staffing costs, pension benefits, capital debt, changing demographics, highway competition, and low fare policies resulted in accumulated deficits nearing US$3.3 billion. Locally considered large and problematic, TRA's deficits paled in comparison to those incurred by European and U.S. transit agencies, and Japan National Railways (JNR) prior to its 1987 privatization. Like JNR and U.S. transit authorities, interest payments on long-term debt represents a significant burden for TRA. Planning for TRA's restructuring had been underway since 2000.

Recent growth in the highway system and increased competition from bus companies and airlines has led to a decline in long-distance rail travel (except during major holidays such as Chinese New Year), though short and intermediate distance travel is still heavily utilized by commuters and students. The high-speed rail line is not run by TR, and is also a major source of competition. To offset this TR has begun placing an emphasis on tourism and short-distance commuter service. This has led to several special tourist trains running to scenic areas and hot springs, the addition of dining cars (originally deemed unnecessary due to Taiwan's relatively small size), and converting several smaller branch lines to attract tourists. Several new stations have been added in major metropolitan areas, and local commuter service increased. Its boxed lunches remain the company's most popular product, with sales totaling NT$320 million (US$10.8 million) in 2010 (around 5% of its annual revenue).

On 31 December 2010, TR signed a NT$10.6 billion contract with Sumitomo Group and Nippon Sharyo to supply 17 tilting train sets capable of traveling 150 km/h (93 mph). These eight-car electric multiple units (EMUs) were delivered from 2012 to 2014 for Taroko Express services running between Taipei and Hualien on the east coast lines. The system achieved a single day record on 5 February 2011 during Chinese New Year celebrations, transporting 724,000 passengers a day.

== History ==
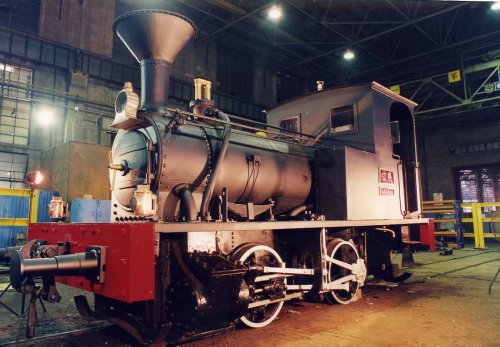
The Teng-yun (Chinese: 騰雲), built by Hohenzollern Locomotive Works, was the first steam locomotive operated in Taiwan.

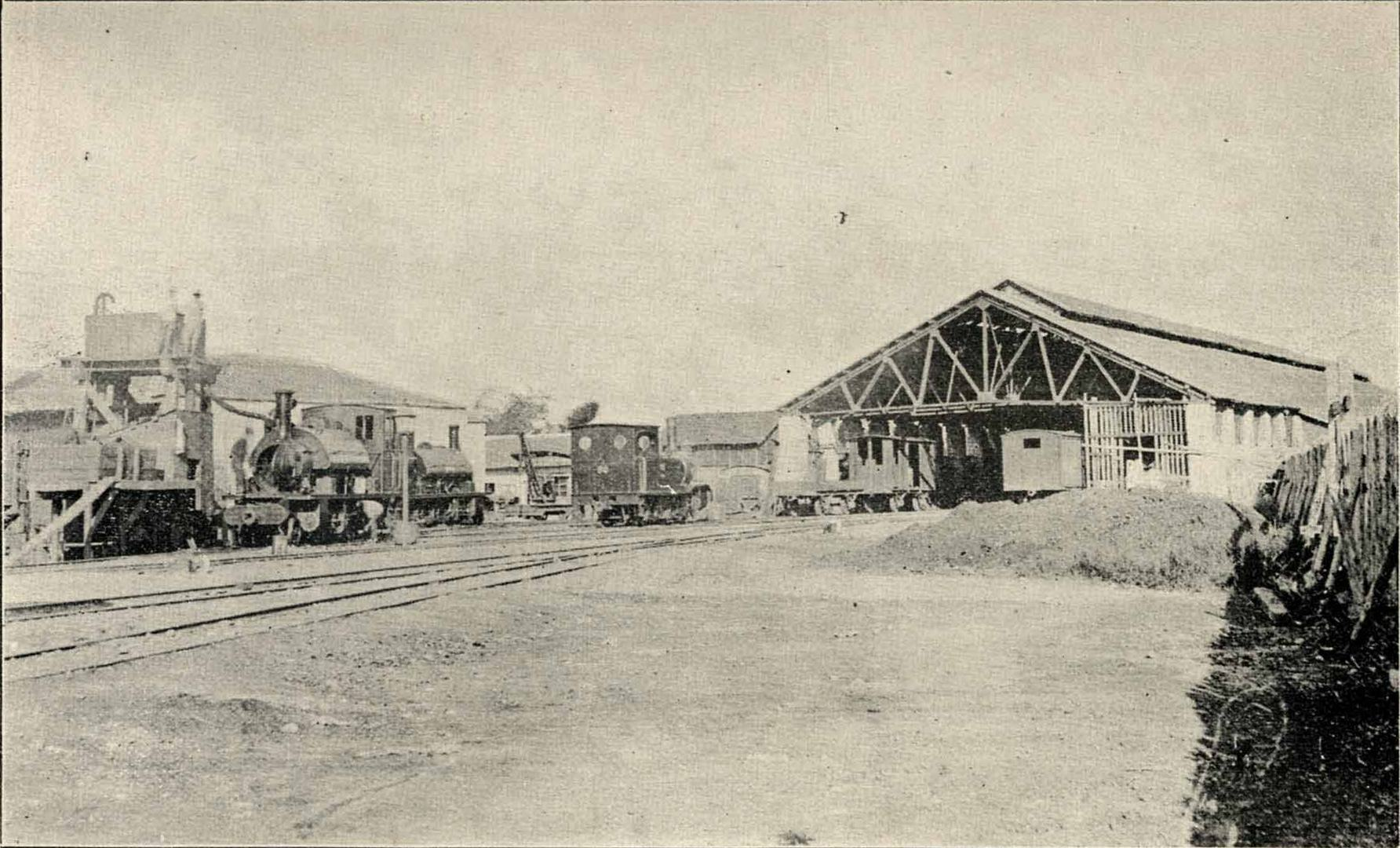
Taipei train station during the Qing era.

The first Taiwanese railway was completed during the Qing era in 1893. In 1895, the Qing Empire ceded Formosa (Taiwan) to the Empire of Japan after the First Sino-Japanese War. The line was about 100 kilometres (62 mi) in length but in a poor condition when the Japanese arrived:

Accordingly work was commenced on the line at once. The Kīrun-Taihoku branch was completely reconstructed as so to avoid the numerous short curves and the steep grades. The line leading from Taihoku to the south received also some attention, the total cost of these improvements reaching nearly two million yen.

— J. Davidson, The Island of Formosa

We thus have practically a new line to Kīrun and another to Shinchiku (formerly Teckcham). In addition to these, new lines were constructed from Taihoku to Tansui, and from Takao to Shin'ei via Tainan-fu, which gives us a total of ninety-three miles of rail. The trunk line connecting the north and south is now in course of construction.

— J. Davidson, Formosa under Japanese rule

The Official Japanese Annual Report of 1935 states (under title Colonial Railways Section II Taiwan):

It was not until the cession of the Island of Taiwan (Formosa) from the Chinese Government to Japan that the island began to enjoy railway facilities, for prior that time the only railroad existing was a small light railway between Kīrun and Shinchiku built at the time of the Qing Dynasty of China. Soon after the cession the Governor-General of Taiwan established a plan, with approbation of the Diet, to build a standard Japanese gauge railway connecting Takao with Kīrun at the expense of 28.800.000 yen. The work of construction was started from both termini and finished in April 1908. This 429.3 mile (690.7 km) line now forms the trunk line in the island communication system. The Imperial Taiwan Government Railway manages three workshops in the Island viz. one each at Taihoku, Takao and Karenkō. The last mentioned is for East Coast line rolling stock.

— Taiwan Railways Administration, History

Due to damage sustained from American bombardment of Taiwan as well as general wartime neglect, Taiwan's railway, both track and equipment, were in a state of advanced disrepair after the Retrocession of Taiwan. Over 1,400 spans of railway bridges had insufficient loading capacity, and over half of railroad ties were decomposed. The railway system also contracted due to the removal of rails, such as between Linbian and Fangliao, in support of Japanese military procurement. The Taiwan Railway Administration began operations in 1947 to recondition and operate the public railways on the island, initially also making use of financial aid from the United States.

In the passenger service department, the TRA introduced the 32100 class of coaches in a streamliner style, as part of its premier service between Taipei and Kaohsiung. Reserved seating was introduced to the railroad initially on this service. Due to a shortage of coaches, TRA converted boxcars as third class passenger coaches; these were phased out in 1961.

A feature of TRA's passengers services today is that each service generally consists of only one class of service, attracting one fare rate. This policy originated in 1951, when the TRA purchased 10 third-class coaches (named TP32200 class) and, instead of augmenting existing services, made two trains consisting of only these new coaches. These trains thus had only a single class of service, deemed in line with the egalitarian ethos of public policy. By 1953, the TRA extended the mono-class policy to all its services, most of which hitherto had consisted of coaches of multiple classes. This would remain TRA's longstanding practice with only a few exceptions: a parlor car was present on the premier train between 1953 and 1957, the Fu-hsing Semi Express, at introduction, briefly was an economic section of the Chu-kuang Express in the same rake, and, recently, the introduction of the EMU3000 class, which features a business class section.

=== Timeline ===
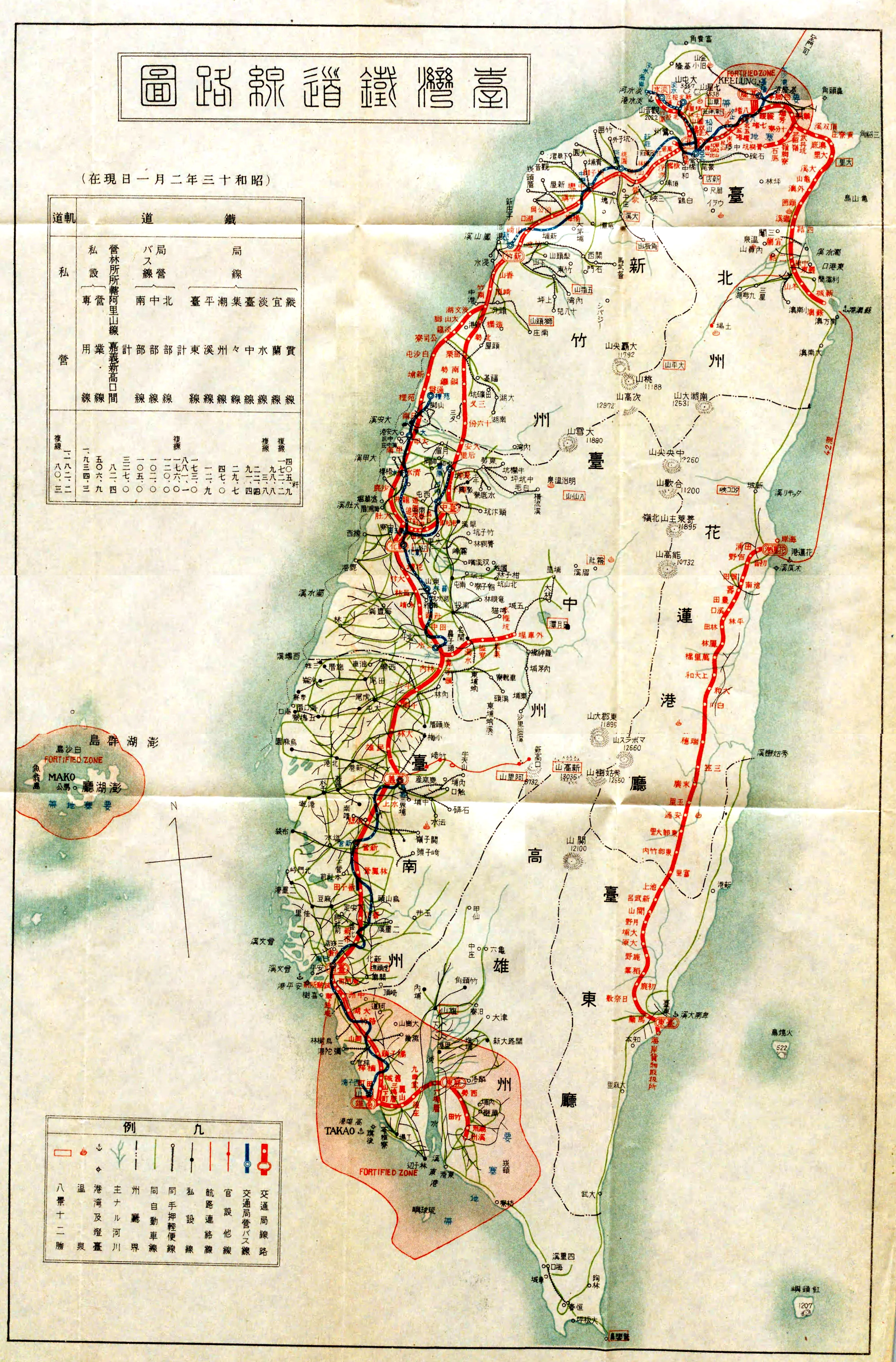
Railway map of Taiwan, 1938

- 1887: Construction begins on first railway in Taiwan between Keelung and Taipei in early March. (Imperial approbation obtained by Qing dynasty governor Liu Ming-chuan, as part of development of new Taiwan Province.)
- 1891: First rail line completed; 20 miles (32 km) branch from Twatutia to Keelung, driven by English engineers
- 1893: First Formosa railway completed.
- 1895: Taiwan ceded to Japan by China following the end of the First Sino-Japanese War. Ministry of Taiwan Railway established by the Japanese Government. Reconstruction begins of Kīrun-Taihoku branch to avoid numerous short curves and steep grades. Work is also performed on the line leading from Taihoku to the south. Total cost of these improvements reaching nearly two million yen. Railway under direct control of the Military Department.
- 1897: The railway comes under control of Civil Department.
- 1898: Local island government announces its intention of carrying on the work itself. Plans formulated by chief engineer Hasegawa.
- 1899: Work started on the southern line from Dagu (打狗) north to Tainan, a distance of 28 miles (45 km); completed in November 1900. Japanese Diet granted 30,000,000 yen for ten years to cover cost of mainline from Taihoku to Takow.
- 1900: The Keelung and Hsinchu lines were repaired. Rolling stock was added. Work commenced on the short branch line from Taihoku to Tansui; completed in June 1901. Over 7 million yen spent by Japanese government on Formosan railways by 1903.
- 1908: Mainline from Taihoku to Takao is completed.
- 1922: The West Coast line (Chikunan - Shōka) is completed.
- 1924: The Giran line (Hatto - Suō) is completed.
- 1926: The Taitō Line (Karenkō - Taitō) is completed.
- 1941: The Heitō line (Takao - Bōryō) is completed.
- 1940–1945: The railways are repeatedly bombed by the Allies during World War II.
- 1945: Taiwan is handed over to the Republic of China.
- 1948: Taiwan Railways Administration established.
- 1949: Taiwan becomes the main base of the Republic of China government after losing the civil war in the mainland to the Chinese Communist Party.
- 1979: West Coast line fully electrified. The North-link line is completed.
- 1989: Rail lines running through downtown Taipei moved underground. The new Taipei Main Station is completed. The Shen-ao line ceases passenger operations.
- 1991: The South-link line completed, completing the rail loop around Taiwan.
- 1997: Online reservations become available.
- 1998: The Former Mountain line ceases operations.
- 2000: The Yilan line is electrified.
- 2001: Various special trains targeting tourists are offered.
- 2003: The North-link line is electrified.
- 2007: The Taroko Express begins operations. The launch of Local Express trains with the delivery of Taiwan Railway EMU700 series. The Neiwan line is temporarily closed in order to allow the construction of the Liujia line.
- 2010: The former Mountain line is reopened to steam trains on special occasions. The Fu-Hsing Semi-Express (復興) of the Taiwan Railways Administration was phased out of regular service completely after 21 December 2010.
- 2011: The Shalun line is opened. The Liujia line is opened.
- 2012: The Linkou line ceases all operations. The creation of Miss Taiwan Railway (臺灣鐵道少女).
- 2013: The Puyuma Express begins operation. The Pingtung line is scheduled to be electrified, completing the electrification of the entire rail loop around Taiwan by 2020.
- 2014: The new local train EMU800 begins operation. The maximum speed of local trains is increased to 130 km/h.
- 2021: The new local train EMU900 begins operation. The intercity EMU3000 also begin operation, intending to replace old and outdated rollingstock.
- 2022: Final Fu-Hsing Semi-Express train journey.
- 2024: Taiwan Railway Administration becomes a state-owned joint-stock corporation, Taiwan Railway Corporation, on 1 January 2024.

== Network design ==
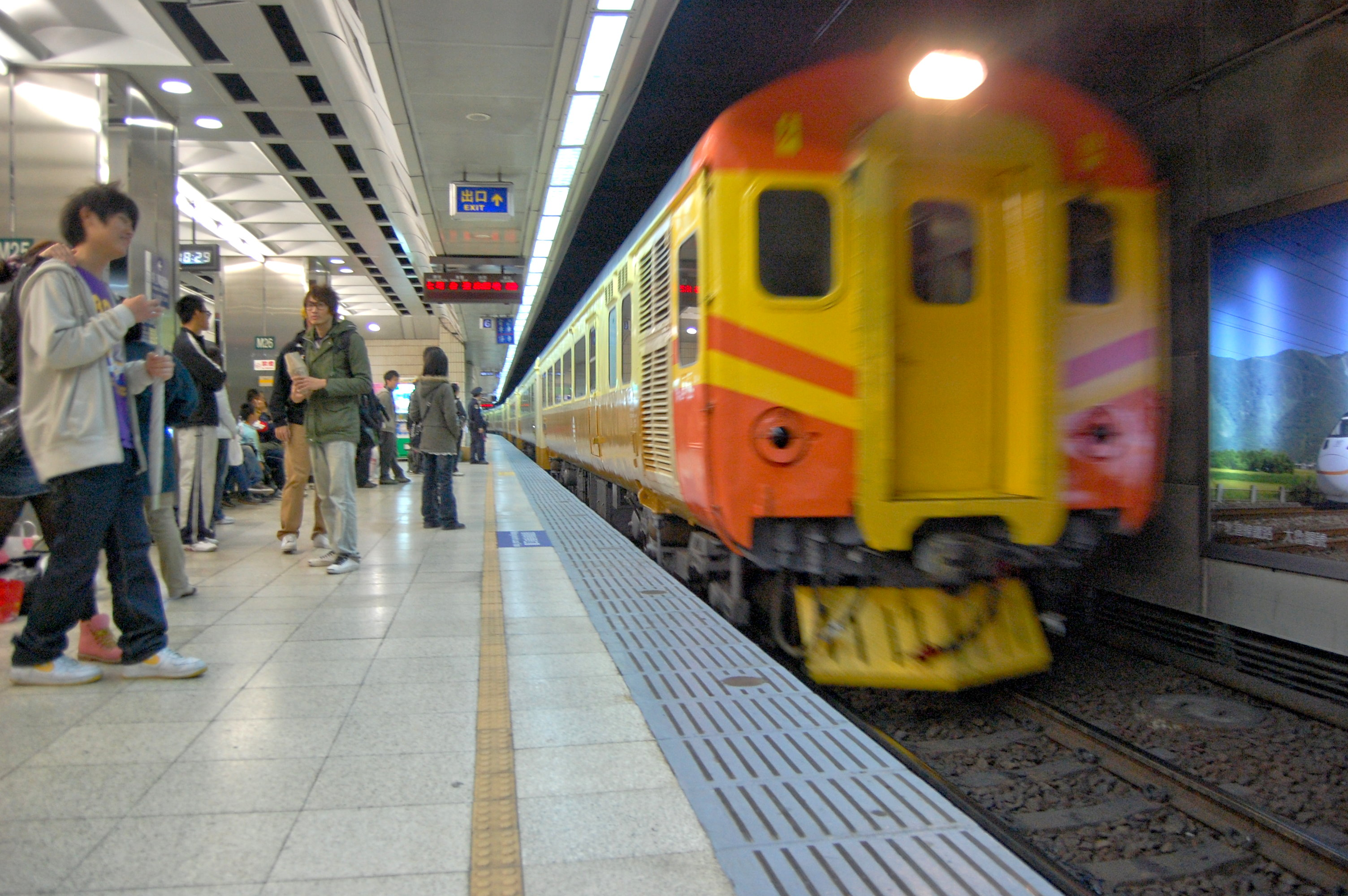
Taipei Main Station's less-crowded underground platform with a British Rail Engineering Limited (BREL) EMU100, used 1978-2009 as Tze-Chang Express Train

TR's network and services reflect strong centralized planning. Although TR is one of many passenger transport operators, its infrastructure allows multiple and convenient connections between modes. Joint transportation and land-use planning make railway projects effective land-development tools.

=== Mainline tunneling ===
The Japanese planned Taipei's railway tunnel prior to WWII. Their main impetus was the major Chung-Hwa Road (Route 1) trunk highway crossing. Taipei's Railway "Undergroundization" Project (Phase I) was approved in 1979, including Taipei Main Station (TMS), 2.8-miles of two-track underground railway, and Banqiao and Nankang yards. Completed in 1989 and costing US$600 million, it replaced the historic Japanese-era Taihoku-eki (臺北駅) and Hwashan yard, eliminated grade crossings in Taipei's congested Wanhua District, providing operating efficiencies. Like New York's Penn Station project, which buried 5.5 route-miles between North Bergen, N.J. and Hunterspoint, Queens by 1908, Taipei Main Station catalyzed urban redevelopment. Development was extensive but not without cultural costs. Modern office towers and underground malls replaced Japanese-era wooden shanties and wholesale outlets, but historic temples were preserved. Later phases completed the four track mainline tunnels, relocated yards to permit transit-oriented development (TOD), and provided a corridor for a much-needed crosstown expressway (Civic Boulevard). By 2008, US$5.8 billion were invested: Banqiao-Xike (16.0 miles) was tunneled, including all trackage within Taipei City, and Xike-Wudu (3.1 miles) was elevated under the TR elevatization program. Nankang's Software Park, Exhibition Centre, and Xike's Science Park were developed around this time.

=== Run-through services ===
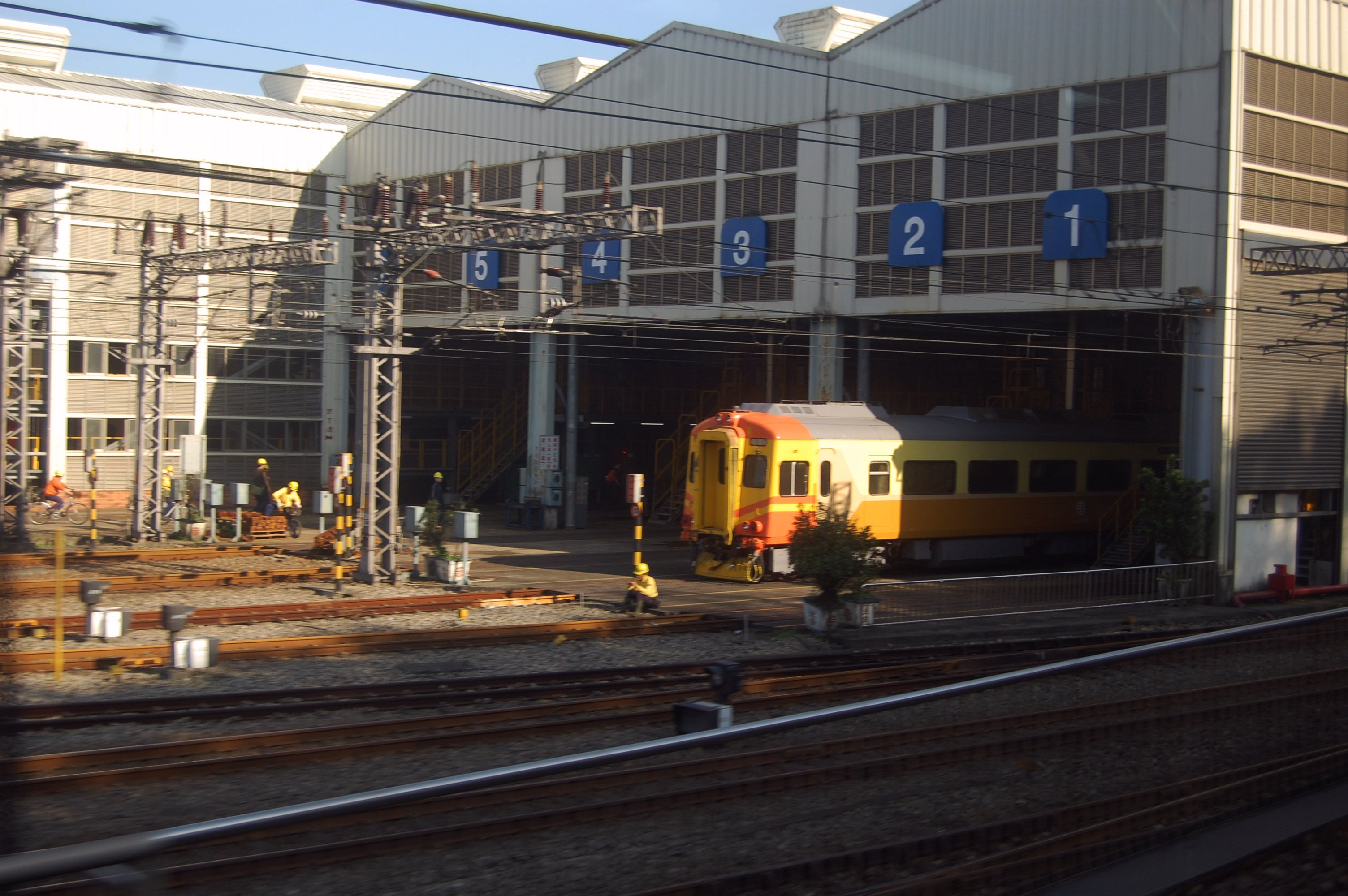
Underground urban trackage and run-through services in Taiwan make efficient use of assets and available track capacity. A now retired Socimi built EMU300 set is being prepared at the Qidu carbarn.

Taipei is Taiwan's capital and ultimate destination for TR's mainlines. Explosive growth since 1980 made Taipei a 10-million population metropolis sprawled over four counties. To accommodate suburban commuters, and to serve passengers traveling to/from suburban business districts, Taipei was envisioned as a through station, allowing West coast trains to operate to Taipei's eastern suburbs, and vice versa.

Through-running reduces platform occupancy times, maximizes one-seat rides, and distributes passengers over multiple stations, reducing crowding. Trains can be moved through Taipei's terminal district in arrival sequence, providing some delay absorption capability. Only ~20% of passenger trips originated/terminated at Taipei Main Station. Trains are turned at outlying yards (where turnback tracks are expressly provided), minimizing conflicting movements. Observation at Banqiao revealed substantial transfer activity between TR and metro.

In the 1990s, east coast trains terminated at Banqiao; WCML trains terminated at Nankang/Keelung. All trains thus operate over the busy Banqiao-Nankang (Bannan) section, effectively providing urban transportation by utilizing surplus capacity on longer-distance through trains. Commuter trains made all suburban stops, while Amtrak-like expresses stopped only at major hubs. These days, most East Coast services terminate at Shulin Station, which is the location of a major TR yard. West Coast services mainly terminate at Qidu Station, which is the location of another large rail yard.

=== Railway facility relocation ===
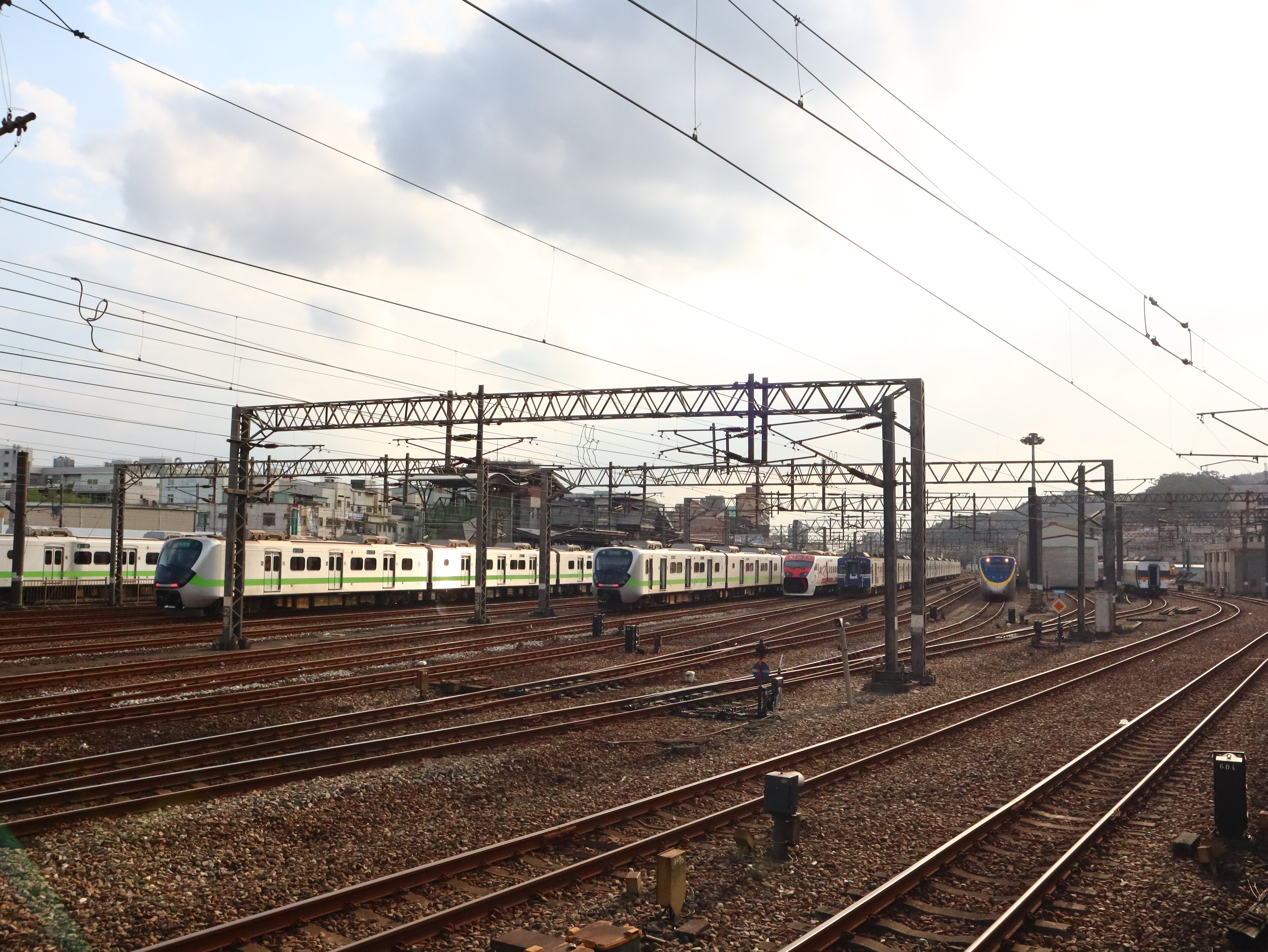
EMUs parked at Shulin yard. To support metropolitan growth, Banqiao yard moved west to Shulin, and Nankang yard east to Qidu, extending through-running operations.

To support metropolitan growth, Banqiao yard moved west to Shulin, and Nankang yard east to Qidu during the mid-2000s, extending through operations to approximately 10 miles either side. Banqiao, Taipei, and Nankang became major interchanges. Like Boston's NorthPoint project planned for a Boston & Maine yard, the former Banqiao yard is now Banqiao station and a successful TOD site. Like the CREATE (Chicago Region Environmental and Transportation Efficiency) plan, through-running allows yards and freight facilities to move from center city (Hwashan, Songshan) to suburbs (Shulin, Qidu), with cheaper land and better highway access.

=== Rapid transit integration ===
Taipei metro shows substantial integration with the network, reflecting Taipei's close municipal central government relationship. Taipei Rapid Transit Corporation's (TRTC) Tamsui–Xinyi Line was converted from Tamsui railway line, while Bannan Line and Songshan–Xindian Line roughly follow the TR mainline and the former Xindian railway line. TR accepts metro farecards within metropolitan Taipei. Four metro lines converge at Taipei Main Station, making subways the local distribution system of TR. New intercity bus terminals were constructed near Taipei Main Station in 2009. Like NJ Transit’s Newark and LIRR’s Jamaica stations, Banqiao and Nankang interchanges afford TR penetration into western and eastern neighbourhoods without long hackney rides or backtracking.

=== Commuter rail and HSR ===
TR’s maximum commercial speed is 130 km/h (81 mph) whereas HSR operates up to 300 km/h (187 mph). Although TR’s long-distance services potentially competes with HSR, Taiwan’s HSR is focused on origin-destination markets over 100 miles like Taipei–Taichung (HSR – 45 minutes on the fastest service; TR – 95 minutes on the Puyuma Express), whereas TR served shorter-haul trips like Taipei–Hsinchu (30 versus 49 minutes). HSR serves Taipei, Banqiao, and Nangang TR interchanges via shared corridors. Except for Taipei (and surrounding stations), HSR stations are located out-of-town, minimizing environmental impacts and property acquisition, maximizing economic development potential, and allowing low curvature alignments. Commuter rail acting as shuttles operated by the TR connects HSR with established provincial downtowns, solving "last mile" problems.

In Hsinchu, HSR and TR stations are three miles apart. Parts of TR's Neiwan line were electrified and rebuilt as a modern commuter railroad, costing US$280 million to connect Hsinchu's historic downtown with the HSR. Connections generate benefits for both modes and catalyze development near HSR stations, much as Interstate interchanges attracted economic activity. This is a transit-oriented version of Beltway success stories played out across 1980s America.

== Infrastructure and scheduling ==
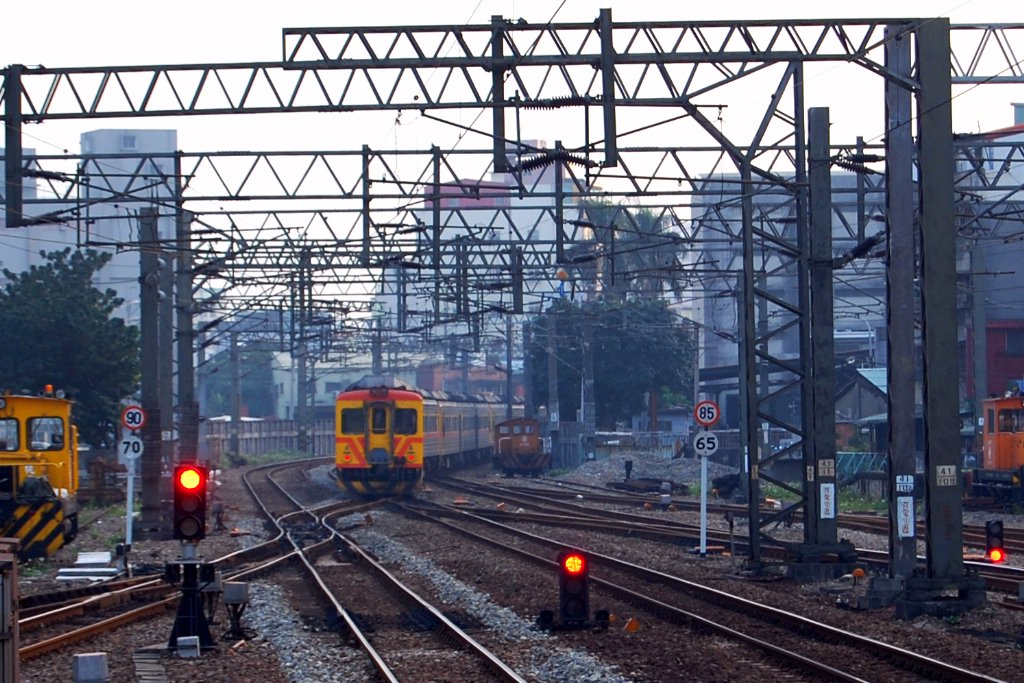
Train terminations and transfers occur at interchanges where double island platforms and full crossovers are provided. The Japanese Tokyu DR3000 DMU is departing from Shulin station, using crossovers for yard access.

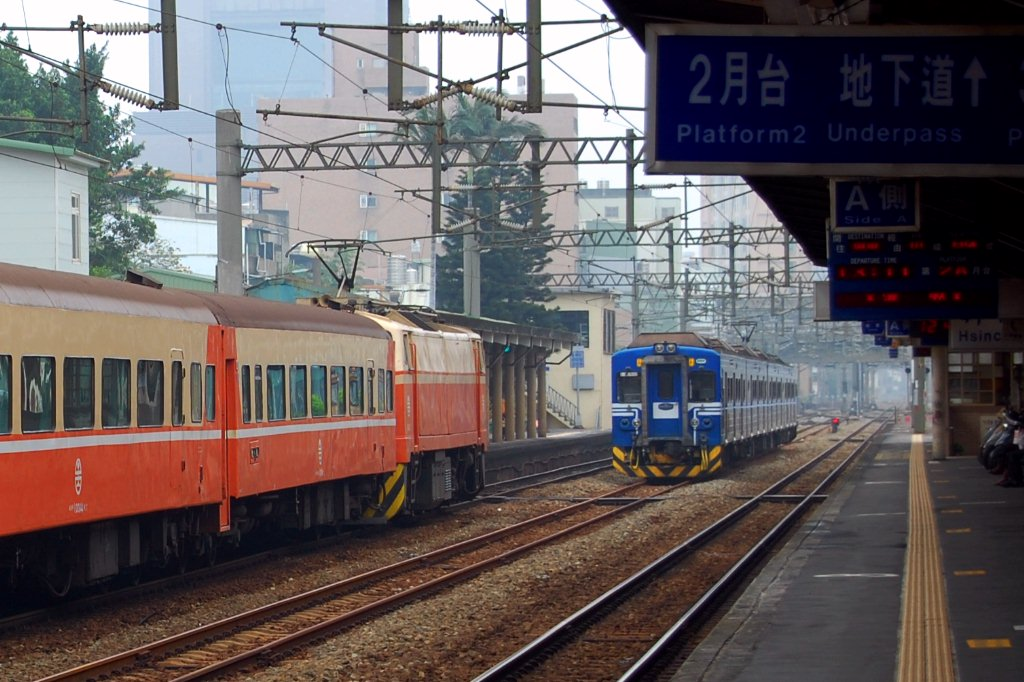
TR's infrastructure designs are targeted towards scheduled movements. The South Korean Daewoo EMU500 commuter unit is being prepared on Hsinchu's middle track while an intercity train departs.

TR's infrastructure might be described as making up for lower track miles with sidings. TR operated single-track sections on busy mainlines until 1998. Double-track sections can accommodate trains at different speeds; passing movements don't interference with opposing traffic, allowing scheduled throughputs of ~15 trains per hour per direction. Scheduling practices assume staff can respond to unforeseen delays and out-of-sequence trains by dynamically utilizing available infrastructure.

TR has recently installed advanced signalling on the northernmost portion of the West Coast line around Taipei, and has performed extensive capacity analysis to maximize train throughputs.

=== Passing tracks at local stations ===
Double-ended sidings (loops) good for typical passenger trains (10–12 cars) are provided at 3–8 mile intervals, at local stations. Some stations have an island platform serving middle siding tracks, and straight-through outside bypass tracks. Schedules provide extra dwell time for trains to hold until an express passes, also serving as en route recovery time, improving reliability. Some stations in single-track territory feature three passing tracks, allowing freight or other equipment to be stowed while opposing passenger trains pass one another. Close proximity of sidings allows TR to squeeze 5–6 tph (both directions, mixed traffic) out of single-tracks.

=== Double island platforms at transfer stations ===
Train terminations and transfers (express/local, branch/mainline) occur at strategic interchanges where double island platforms and full crossovers are provided. Platforms between siding and mainline provide cross-platform transfers, and allow staff to clear terminating trains without obstructing mainline. Where many trains originate/terminate, additional platforms are provided. Crossovers allow convenient layover access and easy multiple-unit (MU) reversals.

=== Side platforms and through tracks ===
Island platforms are not ideal for vertical passenger flow. Side platforms allow direct access from stationhouse through fare control. Through track serves the stationhouse at major stations, where most expresses stop. Middle bypass tracks are available for switching, temporary equipment storage, train preparation, and allows passenger trains to pass freights. Stationhouses are usually on the northbound side (up direction, to Taipei), where originating passengers are voluminous. At minor stations, mainline serves the island platform; locals serve the stationhouse while waiting for overtaking expresses.

=== Explicit scheduling and dispatching priorities ===
Like classic American railroads, TR's published timetable specifies train class (thus dispatching priority). Premium-fare expresses, like Tze-Chiang, have highest priority and almost never take sidings. Customers understand the system, and are not surprised when lower priority trains are held, allowing others to pass. Dispatching decisions are fairly straightforward; even when trains are out of sequence, stationmasters do not hesitate to hold trains if releasing them could delay a subsequent Tze-Chiang. Close proximity of sidings means unscheduled holds are likely short, usually less than 5 minutes.

=== Schedule, ridership pattern, and demographics ===
TR's schedules are not tightly constrained by clock face patterns or policy headways. Extra trains and cars are added on peak travel days to accommodate holiday traffic. 6~8% more departures are scheduled on Fridays, Saturdays, and Sundays. TR riders span the full gamut including lower-income (students, young adults) and minorities (Hakka, Taiwanese indigenous peoples) but also choice riders (vacationing families, foreign tourists, monthly commuters). Elderly passengers are common, but wheelchair passengers are rare; not all stations are handicap accessible and not all rolling stock are level-boarding. Fare differentials between expresses and locals provide market differentiation. HSR ridership is observably more affluent, capturing many former airline passengers.

== Operating practices ==
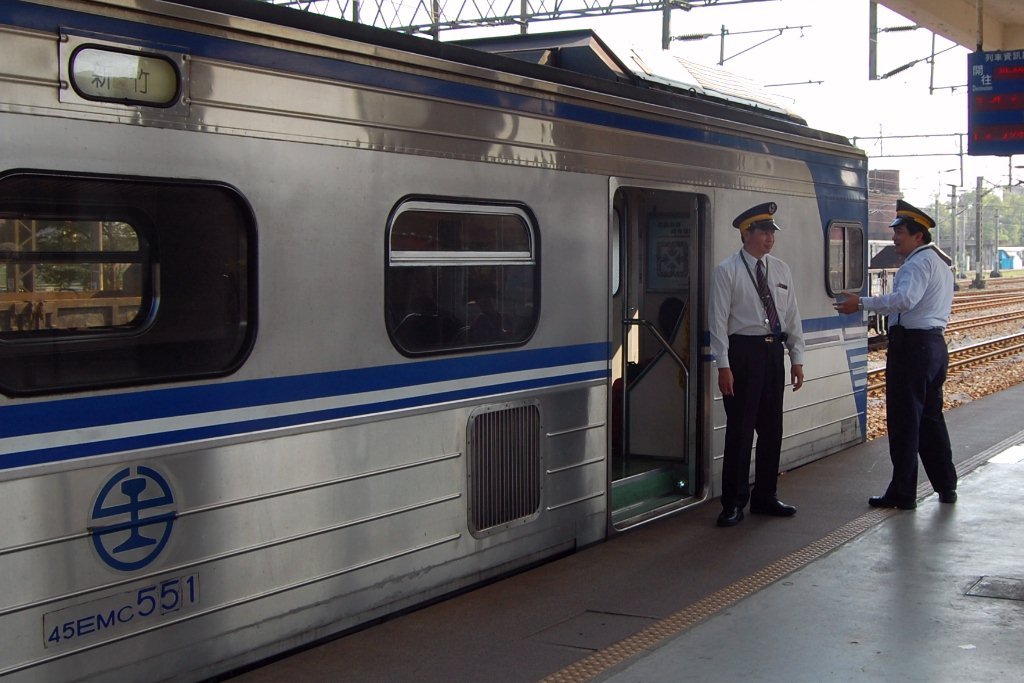
With the train safely immobilized, a Taiwan Railway commuter EMU operator and relief operator exchange pleasantries on Yilan's departure track prior to changing ends and returning to Hsinchu via Taipei.

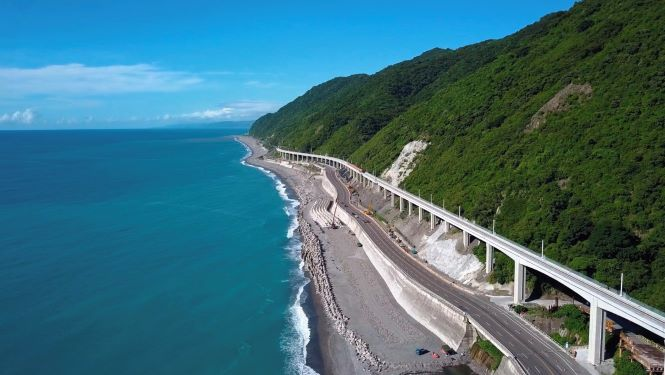
Taiwan Railway's scenic South-link line

Operations on different railroads are variations of similar general principles. TR's practices are like JR's: somewhat labour-intensive, but immediate on-site accountability and close supervision contribute to high service quality, good delay-recovery capabilities, skills to execute complex maneuvers, and throughputs closer to theoretical line capacity than otherwise achievable.

=== Stationmasters, train regulation, and dwell process ===
Many TR stations have "stationmaster duty offices". Stationmasters (their deputies, or platform staff) perform train regulation and signalling functions right from the platform, and provide train crew oversight. Two station crewmembers work busy locations, one per direction. They sound a whistle to warn waiting passengers of imminent arrivals. Passengers standing in yellow danger zones are asked to step back. As trains approach, they hand-signal drivers. Unreserved trains (without assigned cars) berth close to fare control, while expresses berth according to platform car markers, minimizing onboard baggage-carrying by passengers looking for assigned seats. Stationmasters may indirectly reduce overruns by providing immediate accountability.

TR's stationmasters and conductors jointly manage dwell time, like their counterparts at LIRR's Jamaica. Stationmasters regulate trains by enforcing correct train sequences and departure times; holding to time is actually a legal requirement. At transfer locations, they manage connections. About ½-minute prior to departure, stationmasters sound platform bells to signal impending departure. When trains are late, bell is given sooner, shortening dwell times. Once conductors close train doors, stationmasters give the "right away" using platform-mounted equipment. After departure, stationmasters remain on platforms, visually inspecting departing trains.

=== Conductors as captains ===
On board, conductors' primary responsibilities are not ticket examinations – station fare controls provide coverage. Instead, conductors operate doors and announcement systems, ensure onboard safety, sell onboard tickets, provide customer information and assistance, supervise onboard crews, perform emergency procedures, and troubleshoot equipment where possible. The position's multidisciplinary nature is reflected in Asian terms for "conductor" – 列車長; lièchēzhǎng in Guoyu, 車長; ce^{1}zoeng^{2} in Cantonese, and 車掌, shashō in Japanese (still informally used on TR) – which translates to "consist manager" or "train handler". They have overall responsibility for smooth onboard operations and customer experience, actively directing cleaners, attendants, even bento vendors.

=== Onboard services ===
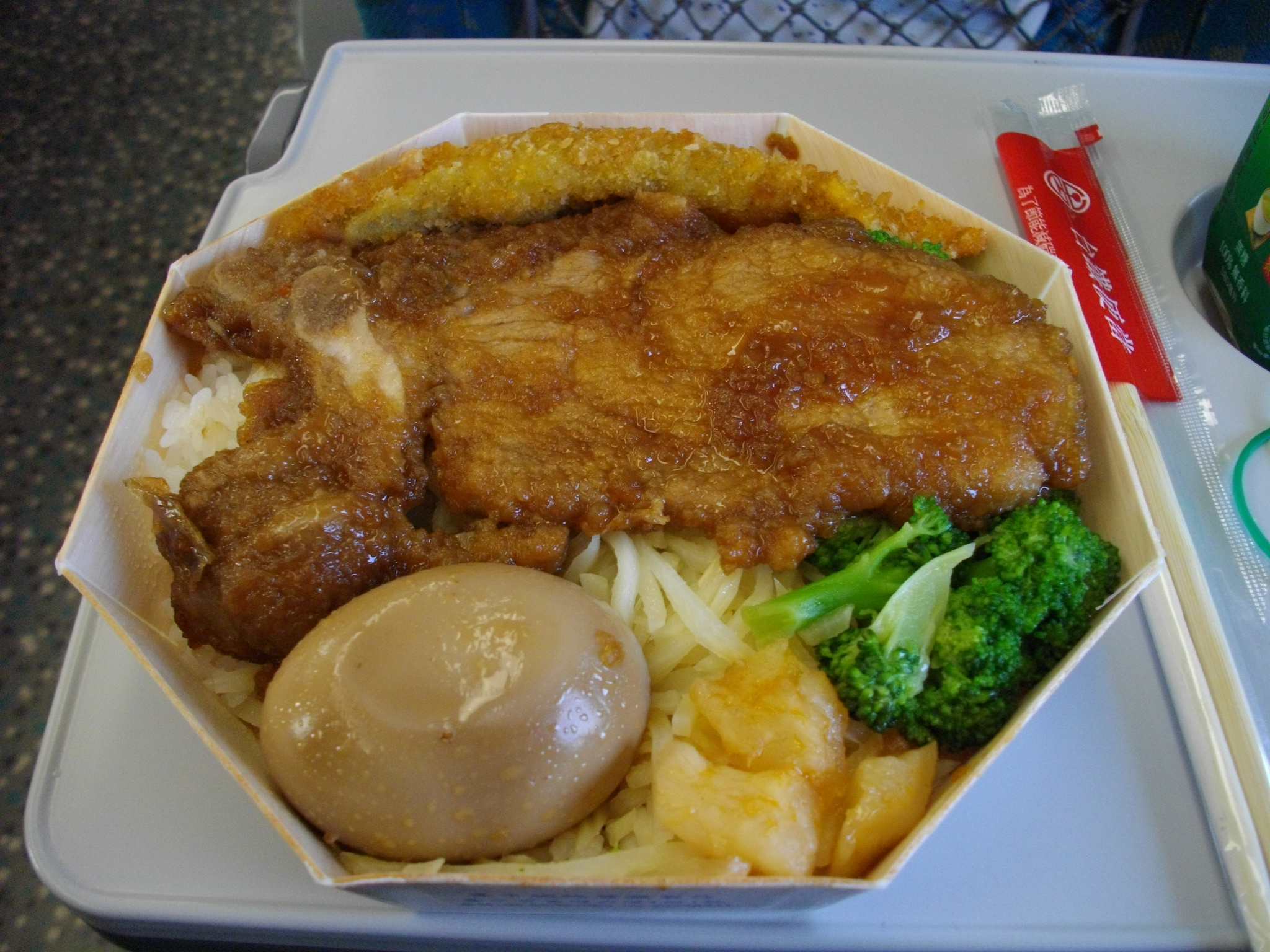
A Taiwan Railway Bento

On TR expresses, cleaners periodically move through the train to remove trash, even proactively asking passengers if visible food items are finished. Train attendants offer bento boxes, drinks, souvenirs, and suncakes (traditional gifts for visiting friends) from small carts.

== Ticketing ==
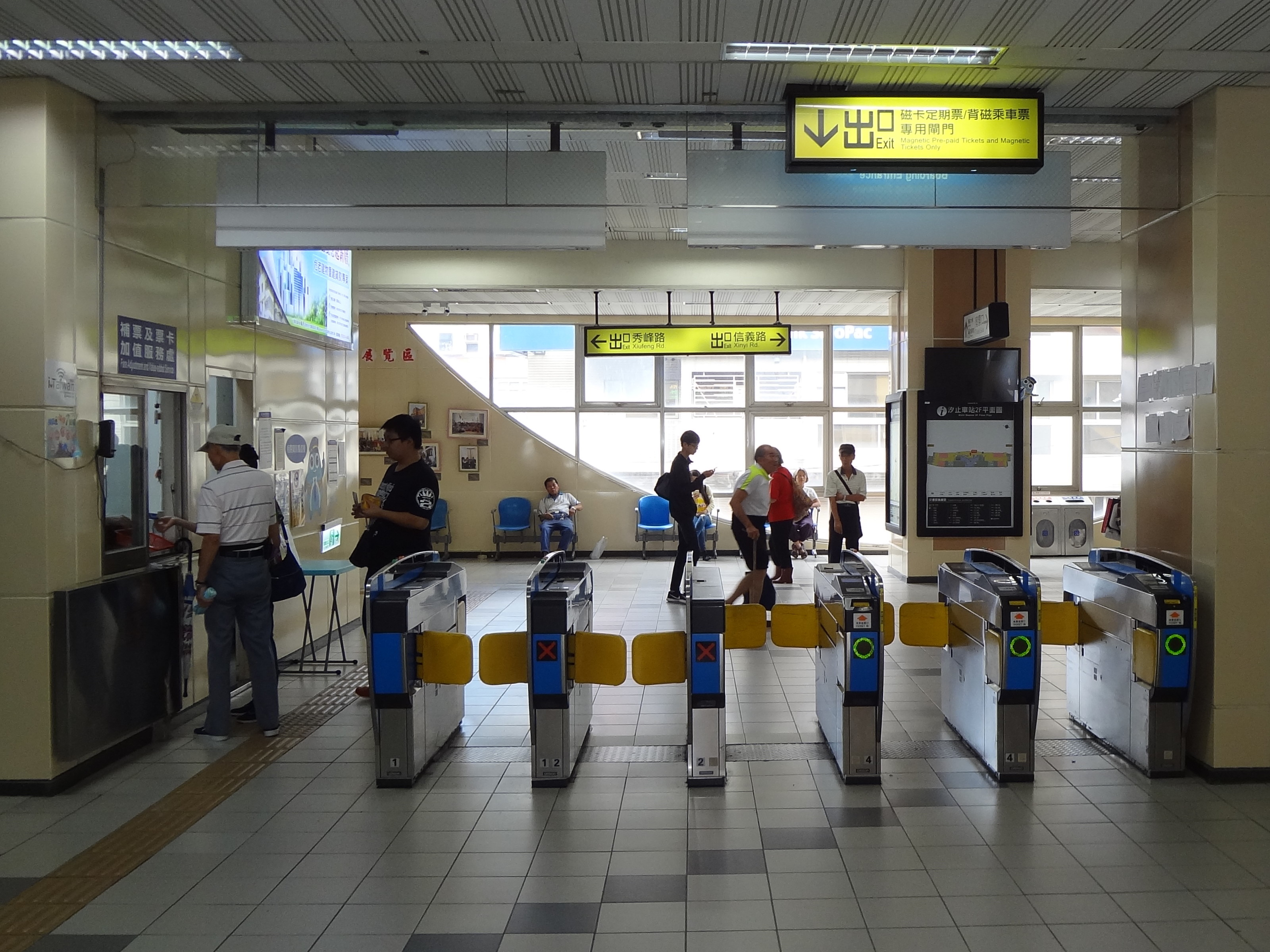
Taiwan Railway faregates and automated fare collection hardware at Xizhi Station

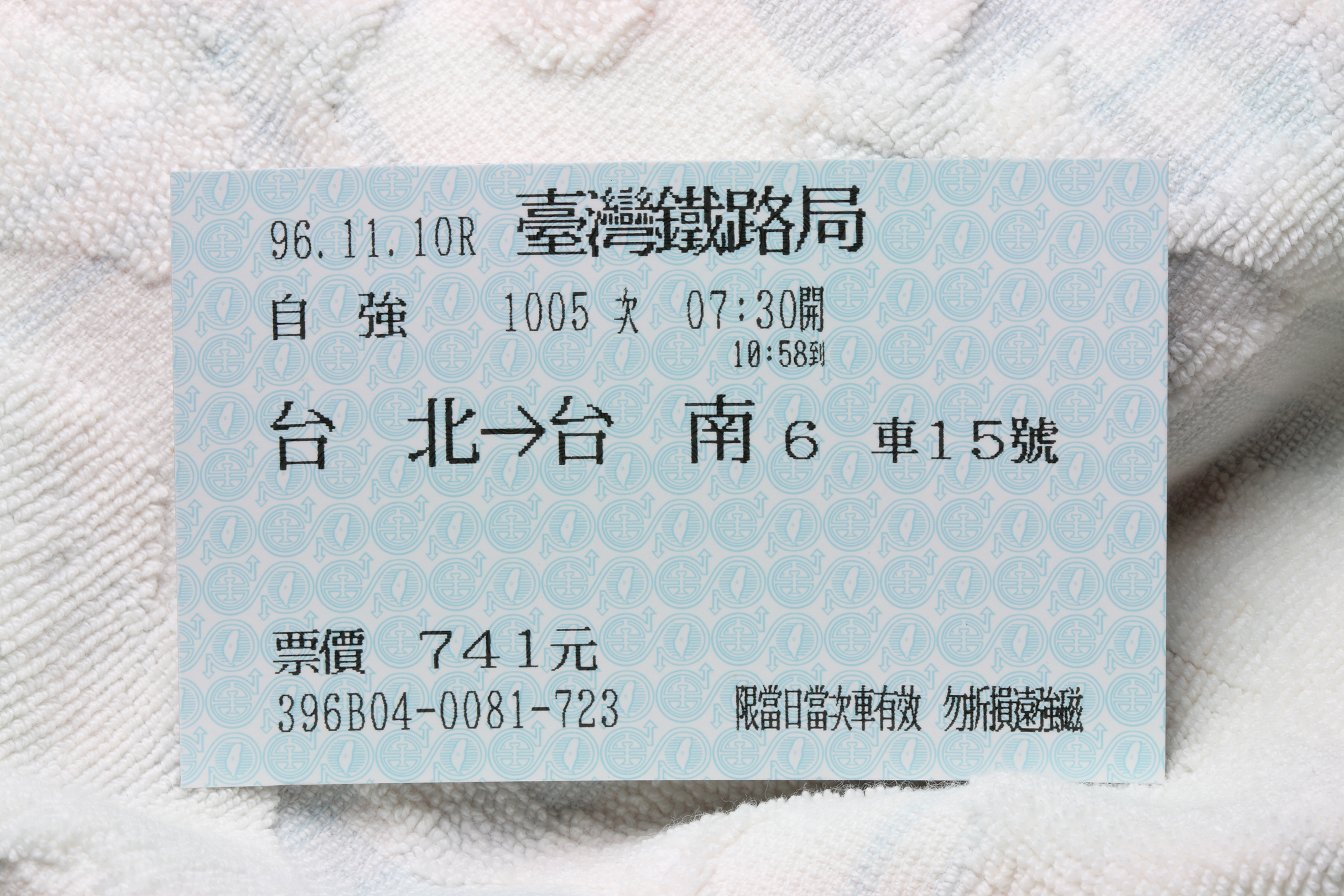
Larger format Taiwan Railways Administration ticket used by Tzu-Chiang express train with seat reservations (Car 6 Seat 15), issued by the AFC system

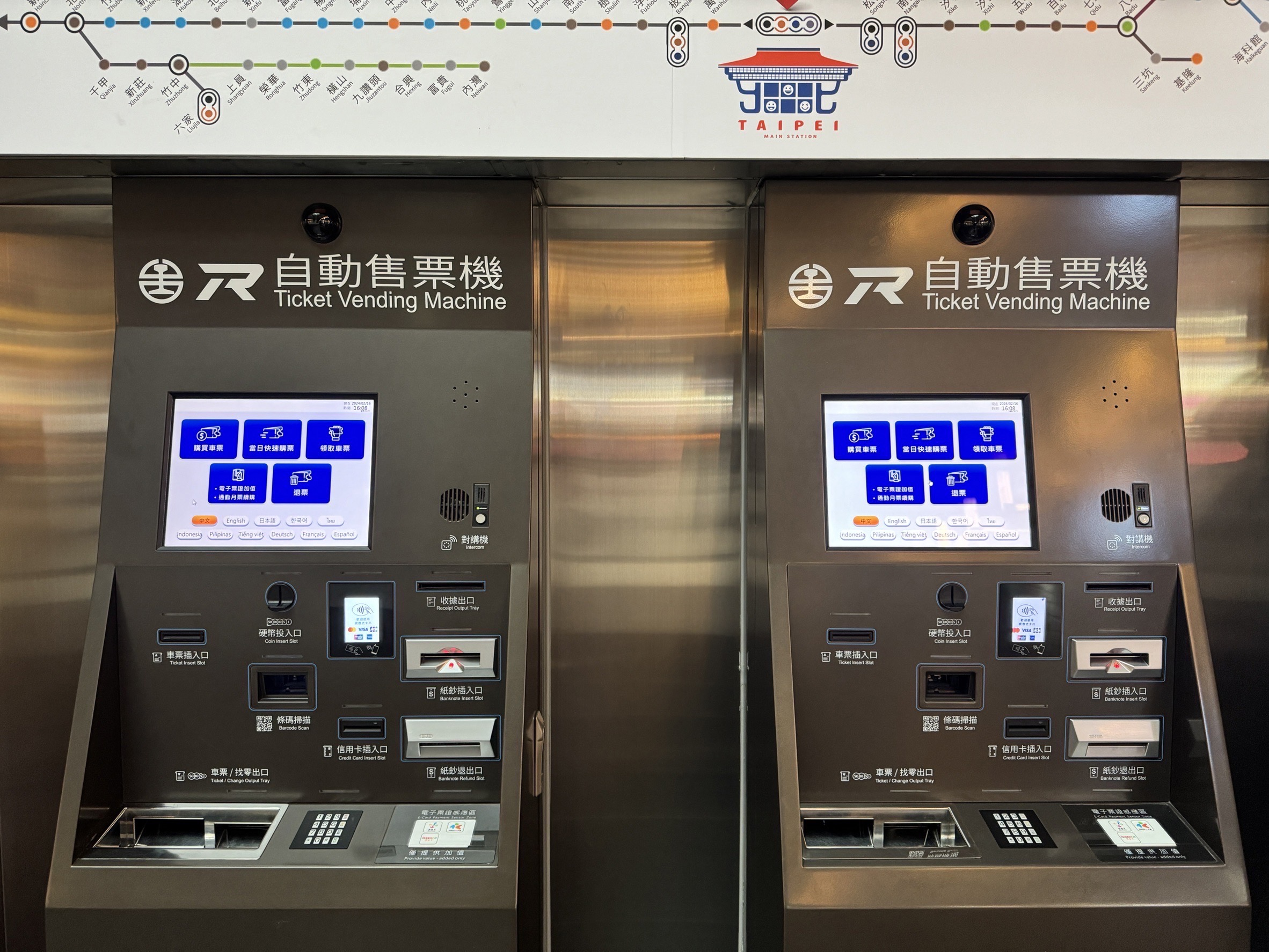
Taiwan Railway's ticket vending machine, capable of credit-card processing and reserved-seating ticket issuance, as seen at Taipei Main Station

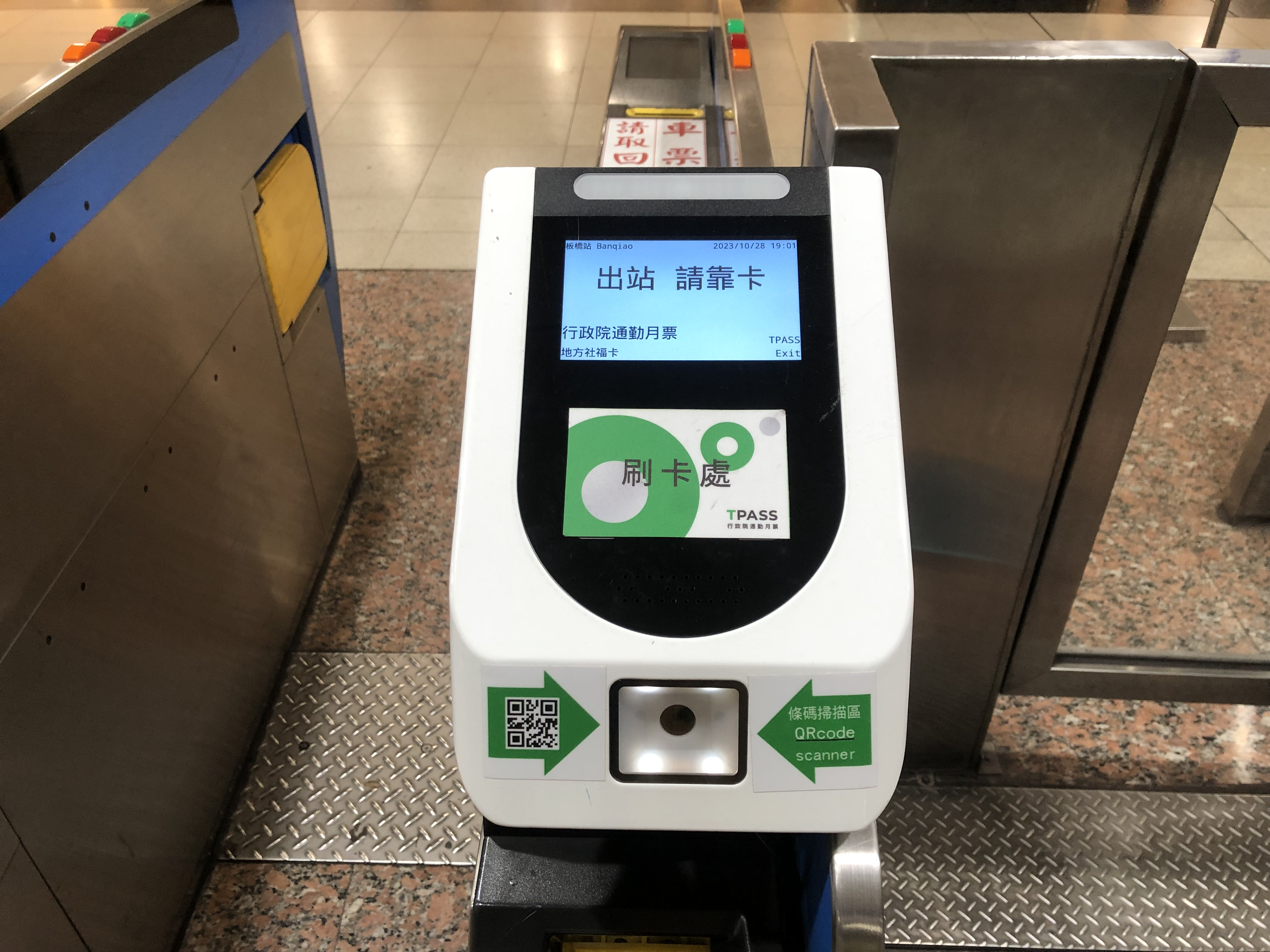
Smart card fare validators

TR's tickets were printed on traditional Edmondson presses until Japan's NEC supplied a computerized ticketing and reservation system in the late 1980s. Almost all stations are divided into paid (platform) and unpaid (waiting room) areas. Normally, ticket examiners govern platform access, checking and punching tickets as passengers enter. Conductors perform onboard ticket checks near peak load points or every ~100 miles, verifying that passengers hold train-class appropriate tickets, and dispense step-up and zone extension fares from portable ticket printers. Examiners also control access to unpaid areas at destinations, ensuring all passengers paid full distance-based fares. Used tickets are collected and not returned to passengers unless cancelled by stamps (similar to postmarks). Those arriving without appropriate tickets (i.e. requiring "fare adjustments") are assessed 50% penalties, giving passengers incentives to find conductors on board to purchase step-up fares. Tickets are validated at origin, destination, and sometimes en route; evasion thus would require elaborate two-ticket schemes or exiting from paid area without going through fare control. Fare evasion rates are thought to be low. Proof-of-payment methods are not used.

=== Fare structure ===
TR's passenger fares are highly regulated and strictly distance/train-class based (short trips <6.3 miles require 34~73 cents minimum fare.) Express fares are 11.7 cents (per passenger-mile); locals are 5.5 cents. Within Taipei municipal zone, single trips are 58 cents regardless of distance/class. Unlike HSR, no time- or demand-based off-peak discounts are offered. Periodic (limited-ride) commutation tickets and multi-ride carnets are available. Fares are generally competitive with private commuter and intercity buses. Express trains operate with higher load factors and are more profitable.

=== Fare validation ===
Fare validation requires substantial infrastructure (paid/unpaid areas), labour-intensive manual ticket examinations, and consequent speed-accuracy trade-offs. During the 2000s, TR incrementally replaced older thermal ticket printers with automated fare collection (AFC) devices using magnetic-backed stock. Busy stations have faregates to speed up validation. Tickets can be inserted in any orientation. Gates align, check, and mechanically punch tickets prior to opening. Validations are fast and can be "pipelined" or "stacked" (i.e. following passenger can insert ticket while previous passenger is proceeding through the gate). Passenger counting sensors quickly close gates when as many passengers entered as valid tickets processed. When exiting, faregates collect and cancel single trip tickets.

However, many locations still use heat-sensitive tickets without ATC, requiring one ticket examiner per fare control. Examiners punch and collect non-magnetic tickets, provide customer information and assistance, troubleshoot AFC malfunctions (e.g. mutilated tickets), and return cancelled (stamped) tickets to passengers requiring proof-of-travel for expense claims. TR volunteers (with yellow vest) staff some gates. Volunteers, like America's auxiliary police and volunteer firefighters, include carefully selected and specifically trained members of the public, and retired industry personnel. They assist passengers, sometimes exercising Japanese or English language skills, and report turnstile jumpers and AFC malfunctions to employees. Station management has considerable latitude in determining work scope of volunteers.

=== Ticketing processes ===
Most TR stations feature staffed ticket offices, supplemented by ticket vending machines (TVMs) at busy locations. Unreserved single or day-return tickets must be purchased on the day of travel (to prevent ticket reuse), leading to ticket queues at peak commuter periods. Passengers purchasing advance tickets can delay entire queues, causing imminent train departures to be missed. To maximize passenger throughput, separate ticket windows provide train information, today's tickets, and advance or commutation tickets. Some daily ticket windows only accept cash, further decreasing transaction times. Ticket windows at busy stations can be dynamically switched between different functions, minimizing daily ticket queues.

=== Fare vending machines ===
Early machines designed primarily for commuters are essentially receipt printers, accepting only coins (no bills) and prepaid magnetic TransitChek-like cards – not credit cards. Passengers must first insert coins (amount deposited is displayed), then press numerous lighted buttons sequentially to specify traveller count, train class, single/return/concessionary, and destination. Buttons light up only when adequate coins are inserted. TVMs sell only unreserved single/round-trips to local destinations (<50 miles) from the current station. Earlier button presses constrain subsequent choices: destinations for which insufficient fares were paid (in selected train class) do not activate and have no effect.

This machine's target audience is regular travellers who already know required fares. Passenger experiences for first-time customers can be confusing, but once customers learn this TVM, unreserved day ticket transactions are processed much faster than on typical full-feature machines. Machines need only electricity (not network connections) and staff to replace ticket stock, remove coins, and clear jams. Like soda machines, they are robust, self-contained, and have been deployed to remote locations.

Long distance TVMs selling advance-purchase, reserved-seating, and prepaid internet/phone tickets were developed later. These more complex machines, functionally similar to Amtrak's Quik-Trak, are available at principal West coast stations.

=== Contactless Smartcard fare payment ===
TRTC pioneered transitcards in 2000 via affiliate Taipei Smart Card Corporation, which performs backoffice functions for TRTC, Taipei's Taipei Joint Bus System (market-sharing conference) group of bus companies, and other EasyCard merchants. In 2008, TRTC assisted TR in implementing entry-exit smartcard fare collection for local travel within Taipei's metropolitan zone (Keelung-Zhongli), offering 10% discounts from regular local train fares. Smartcard holders can travel on regular local and express trains, but not Tarokos, Puyumas, sightseeing specials, nor in business class. When travelling on expresses, smartcard seats are unreserved. As expresses are often sold out, EasyCard offers de facto standee discounts. Travelers with only a smartcard entry and no reserved seat ticket who board Taroko and Puyumas express trains will receive a considerable fine. All others including Chu-kuang and Tze-chiang express trains are available for smartcard entry.

Origin/destination validation and existing fare control areas made smartcard implementation easier. Instead of punching tickets to enter and relinquishing tickets to exit, users tap-in and tap-out. Faregates are replaced with newer integrated designs as funding allows. In the interim, ticket collectors visually verify each transaction on low-cost stand-alone terminals, allowing rapid deployment.

Smartcard development in Taiwan is currently fluid. With 13 million cards issued, readers for Mifare Classic-based EasyCard are already installed at convenience stores like Family Mart. Legislation authorizing "Third Generation e-Purse" (stored value limit ~US$300) was passed in March 2010, allowing smartcard payments for low-value non-transportation items, like Hong Kong's Octopus Card. Three major competitors hold regional subway/bus fare collection franchises (Taipei's "Youyoka" EasyCard, Mid-Island's Taiwan Easy Go "TaiwanTong", and Kaohsiung's "I Pass"), and TR has active pilots with both EasyCard and TaiwanTong. Taiwan's MOTC expects to eventually integrate all electronic farecard systems nationwide.

=== Rail pass ===
Besides single ticket, TR has also been offering various types of rail pass, with which travelers can ride on trains without buying single tickets. Currently, TR offers TR Pass to travelers such that they have unlimited ride on trains within the set period. The pass has two versions - the General Pass and the Student Pass. TR first offered the Student Pass to foreign students in December 2006 in order to attract more foreign visitors. The offer was extended to local students in 2009. Finally, parallel to the Student Pass, a General Pass, which could be used by everyone, was issued in 2010, so as to replace the ineffective "Round-the Island Pass" (環島週遊票), which had been offered since 1998.

The Round-the Island Pass had several restrictions making it unpopular. First, holders of the pass must either travel in the clockwise or anti-clockwise direction without traveling backwards. Secondly, travelers could only pick seven stops to get off and visit. Once a traveler has got off in seven stations, the pass became invalid. These restrictions were deemed too restrictive and limited the use of the pass. After the issue of the TR General Pass in 2010, this pass ceased to be issued.

== Passenger information systems and signage ==
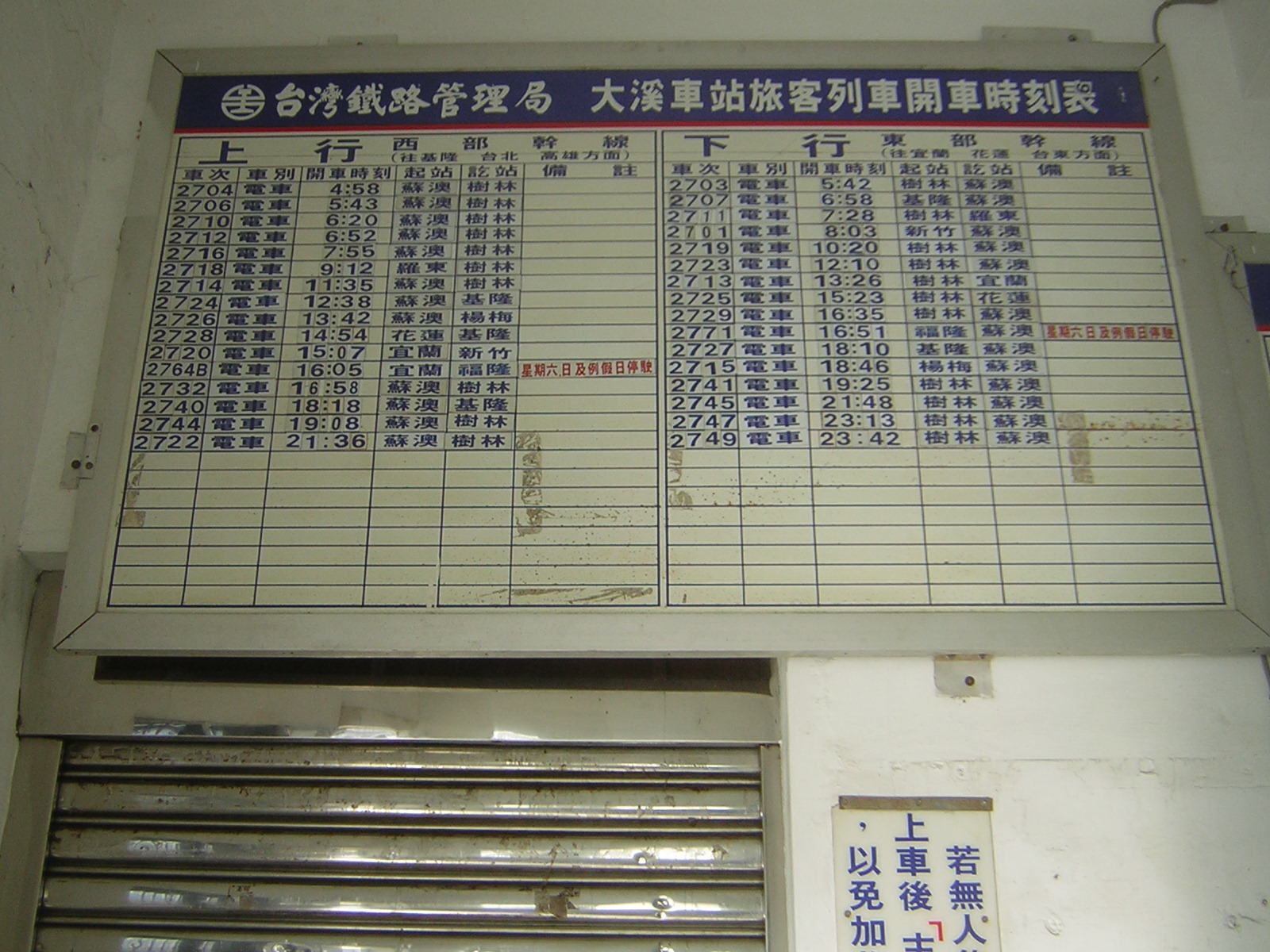
Traditional Taiwan Railway acrylic schedule boards at Daxi Station

TR takes a holistic and comprehensive approach towards passenger information. Devices used (in both English and Chinese) range from schedule posters, fixed signage to departure monitors and next-train displays.

Split-flap display boards, monitors, or smaller LED displays are provided at major terminals and principal stations. One display per control area shows boarding times and track assignments. Delays as short as one minute are posted. Large acrylic signboards show departure times and fares at smaller stations. Ubiquitous clocks throughout stations and facilities make it difficult to find spots where fewer than two clocks are immediately visible.

=== Platform signage, next train identifiers ===
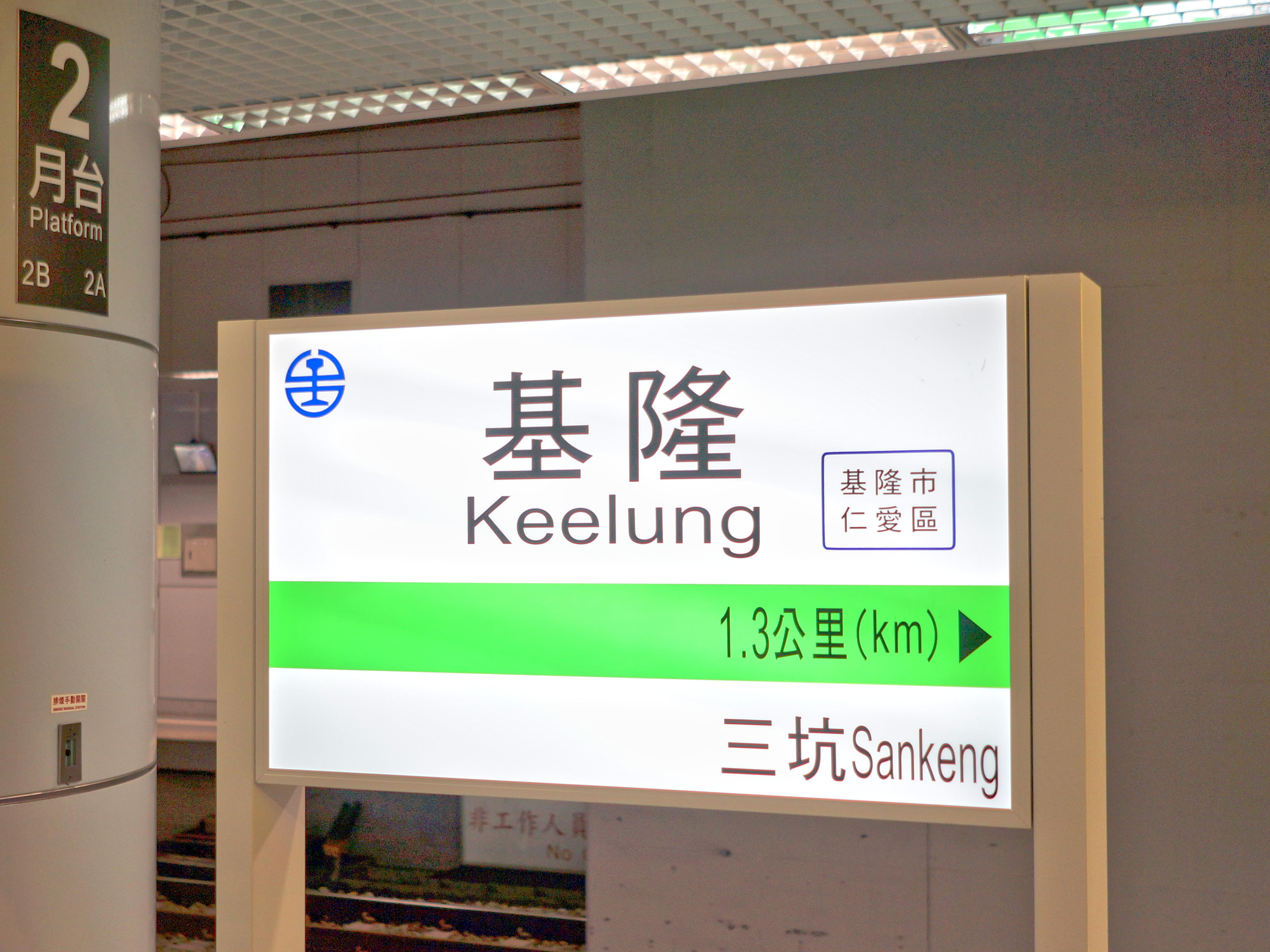
Taiwan Railway's large light box signs indicate station names and distances to adjacent stations.

Backlit acrylic signs (airport-style with iconic representations) identify platform and carriage numbers, and provide directions to facilities like restrooms and elevators. Boxes display schedules, tourist information, and service change notices. Large signs (legible from passing trains) indicate station names, and distances to previous/next stations, for use by passengers and crew. Platform LED displays provide next train identity, departure time, delay information, and context-sensitive messages, including public service announcements.

=== Onboard displays and announcements ===
TR's mixed fleet ranges from 1960s hauled stock to new Tarokos and commuter trains. Newer trains feature automated display/announcement systems with high-density dot-matrix LEDs like Taipei's metro. On long-distance coaches with longer time between station stops, scrolling displays are used. Like in Continental Europe, automated onboard announcements are multilingual. Announcements are in four major languages (Mandarin, Taiwanese, Hakka, and English). In rural areas, announcements are also made in local aboriginal languages; Taitung line has the aboriginal Pangcah/Amis language. In unusual situations, conductors can usually make announcements in at least two languages.

Trains lacking automatic train location features are not simple to retrofit. TR devised low-cost multi-lingual "announcement boxes" connected to the public address system, manually triggered by conductors on approach to stations.

=== Exterior train identification ===
Identifying arriving trains quickly and accurately is equally important to employees and passengers. Classically, lighted acrylic destination signboards are manually changed at terminals. Recent modernization efforts provided exterior LED displays showing destination, route, train number, and class. Newest cars have bilingual flexible displays built-in. Train numbers are especially important on expresses, helping customers identify seat reservations.

== Modernisation ==
Under the Railway Bureau, many projects have been undertaken to modernise the railway system and improve its efficiency.

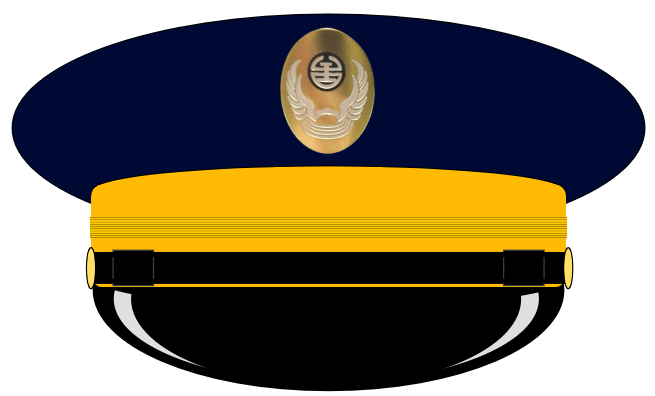
A TR train master hat. The cap's badges and drawings are from the original Republic of China national emblem, the dove of peace has now become TR's logo, the radial lines symbolizing speed and efficiency.

Under the "East Railway Improvement Project", the route between Taipei and Hualien was electrified. The section between Badu (in Keelung) and Taitung was improved by changing to 50 kg/m rail, automating traffic signals, and including portions of double tracks. Work began in June 1998 and was completed in December 2004, costing NT$43.691 billion. As part of the project, the Xinguanyin Tunnel (at 10,307 m (33,816 ft), the longest double track railway tunnel in Taiwan) and the New Yongchun Tunnel were constructed. The "Continued Improvement of Eastern Railways Project" was approved by the Executive Yuan on 30 June 2003, and involved a 5.7 km (3.5 mi) stretch between Dongshan and the Wulaokeng River. It included the construction of the elevated Dongshan Station as well as two branch lines. The project cost NT$2.779 billion, began in February 2004, and was completed by the end of 2008.

Railway lines in eastern Taiwan are undergoing electrification and double-tracking improvements to increase train speeds from 110 km/h (68 mph) to 130 km/h (81 mph). The first phase of the project is expected to be completed by the end of 2013 and will cut travel time between Taipei and Taitung down by about 1.5 hours. Completion of drilling for the Shanli Tunnel, the longest on the modified route, took place in March 2012.

=== Corporatization of TRA ===
Because of the several hundred-billions TWD of liabilities, and the legal person type of TRA is considered a block for elasticity operations of railway systems, there were several campaigns and groups set up that aim to take privatization and corporatization actions for TRA since 1990s. In May 2022 the Executive Yuan approved an act, called Taiwan Railways Limited Liability Company establishment ordinance, it's ruled that TRA will transit to be a state-owned railway company that operate exclusively by the government, set up a fund to handle debts of TRA, no employees of TRA will be axed, and consider raising up salaries by 3~5%. According to the ordinance, TRA is now renamed to Taiwan Railways Corporation Limited since 1 January 2024.

== Lines ==
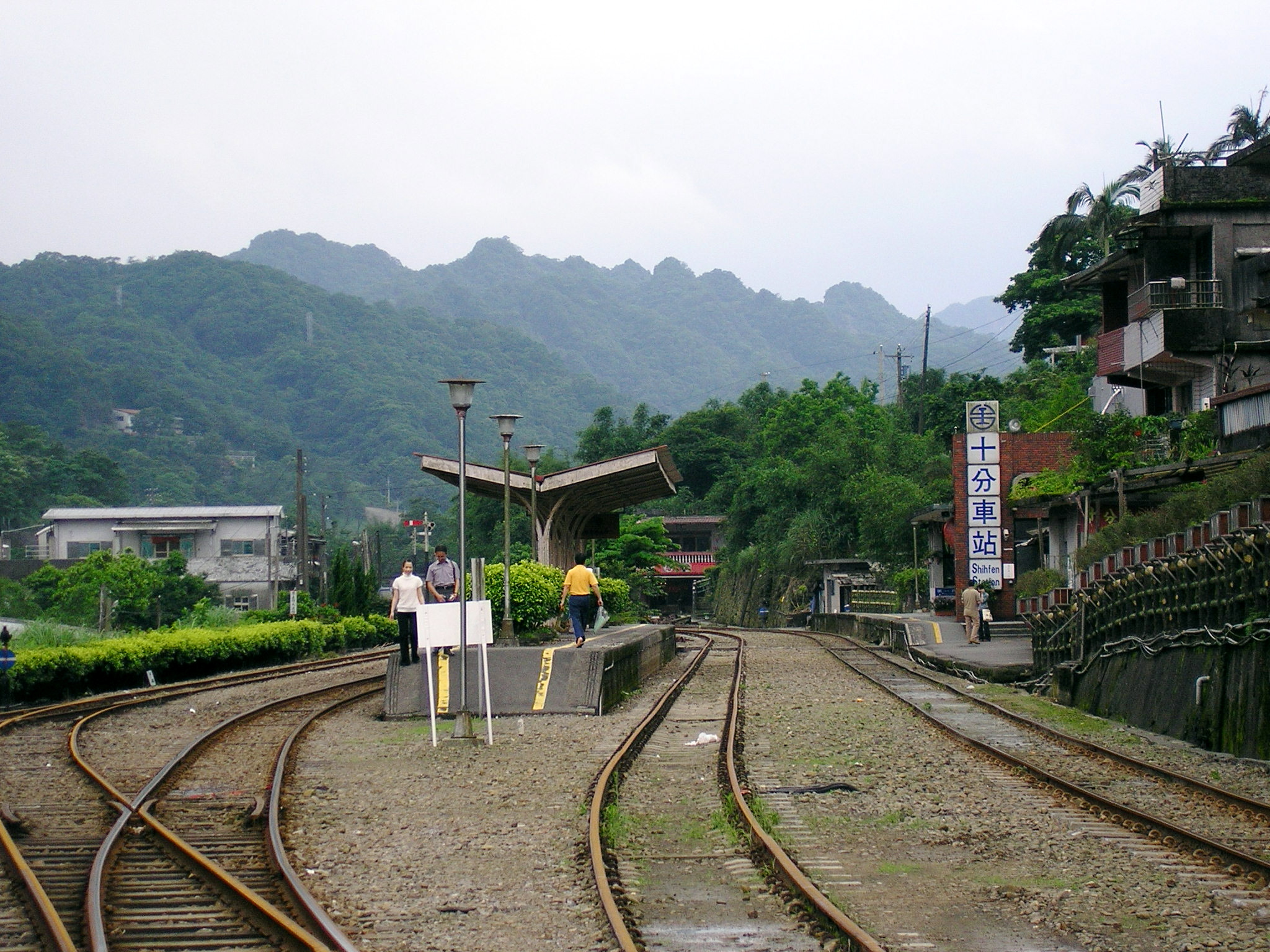
Shifen station on the Pingxi line

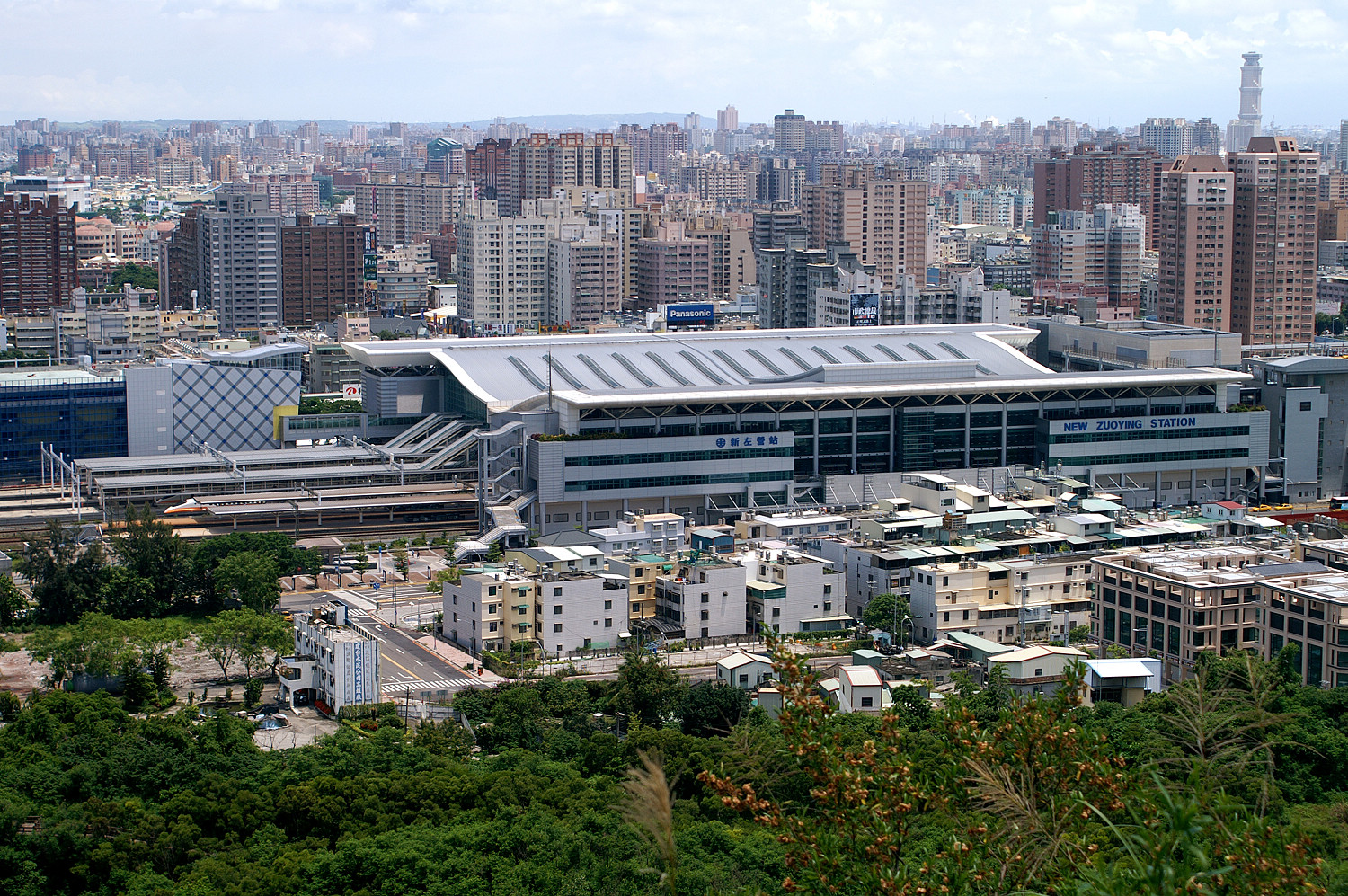
Xinzuoying Station in Kaohsiung

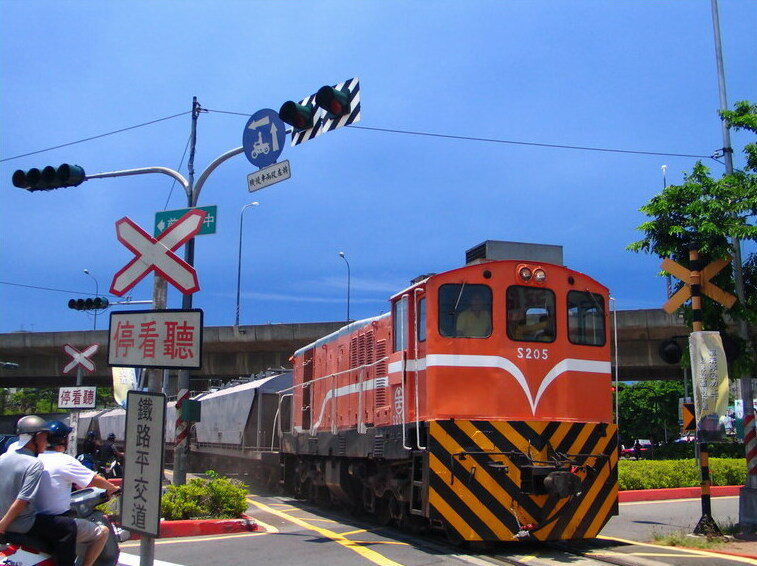
A local freight train using the now-abandoned Kaohsiung Port line at the Zhongshan Road level crossing

=== Current passenger lines ===
- Western Trunk line (西部幹線): Keelung to Pingtung
  - Coastal section (海線): Zhunan to Changhua
- Eastern Trunk line (東部幹線): Badu to Taitung
  - Branch from Su'aoxin to Su'ao
- South-link line (南迴線): Pingtung to Taitung

==== Branches ====
- Pingxi line (平溪線): Sandiaoling to Jingtong
- Liujia line (六家線): Zhuzhong to Liujia
- Neiwan line (內灣線): North Hsinchu to Neiwan
- Chengzhui line (成追線): Chenggong to Zhuifen
- Shen'ao line (深澳線): Ruifang to Badouzi
- Shalun line (沙崙線) : Zhongzhou to Shalun
- Jiji line (集集線): Ershui to Checheng

=== Other lines ===
- Keelung Harbour line (基隆臨港線)
- Hualien Harbour line (花蓮臨港線)
- Taichung Harbour line (台中港線)
- Kaohsiung Harbour line (高雄臨港線)
- Former Mountain line (舊山線): Sanyi to Houli. A former path of the Taichung line closed in 1998. Reopened in 2010 to steam trains on special occasions. Shengxing has been declared a historical site.

=== Planned ===
- Hengchun line (恆春線): Kaohsiung - Kenting

==== Defunct ====
- Donggang line (東港線): Zhenan, Pingtung County – Donggang, Pingtung County. Passenger service discontinued in 1991, completely closed in 2002.
- Dongshi line (東勢線): Fengyuan, Taichung City to Dongshi, Taichung City. Passenger service discontinued in 1991. Transformed into a bike trail by the Taichung City government.
- Shengang line (神岡線): Tanzi, Taichung City to Daya, Taichung City. Service discontinued in 1999. Also transformed into a bike trail.
- Tamsui line (淡水線): Taipei to Tamsui, New Taipei City, closed in 1988 for metro construction. Replaced by Tamsui–Xinyi Line of Taipei Metro on a similar route.
- Hsintien line (新店線): Wanhua to Xindian, closed in 1965. Replaced by the Taipei Metro Songshan–Xindian Line of Taipei Metro on a similar route.
- Linkou line (林口線): Taoyuan District to Linkou District, closed in 2012. Transformed into a bike trail.
- Xinbeitou branch line (新北投線): Beitou District (Beitou station to Xinbeitou station), closed in 1988 for metro construction. Replaced by the Xinbeitou branch line of the Taipei Metro.
- Songshan Airport line: Songshan station to Songshan Airport, closed in 1976.
- Hsinchu Airport line: Hsinchu station to Hsinchu Airport, closed in 1997 and converted to a road.
- Kaohsiung Port line: Kaohsiung station to Kaohsiung Port station, closed in 2018 and converted to the circular light rail line.
- Pingtung Airport Line: Pingtung station to Pingtung Airport, closed in 1997.
- Zhonghe line: Banqiao station to Zhonghe station, closed in 1990 for metro construction. Replaced by Taipei Metro Zhonghe–Xinlu Line of Taipei Metro.
- Sanzhangli branch line: Huashan station to Lianqin 44th Arsenal, closed in 1986.

== Services ==
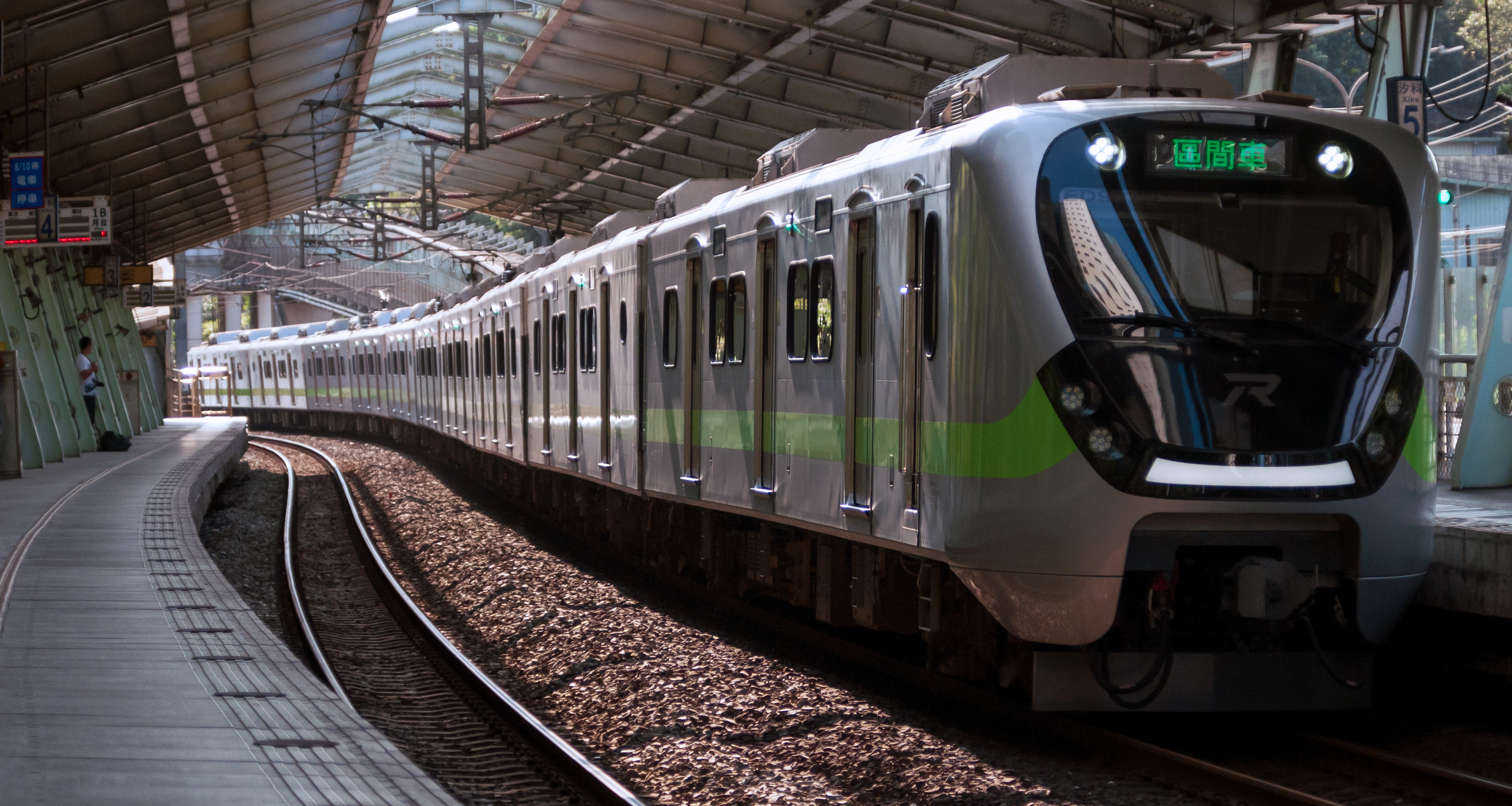
An EMU900 series local train arriving at Xike Station

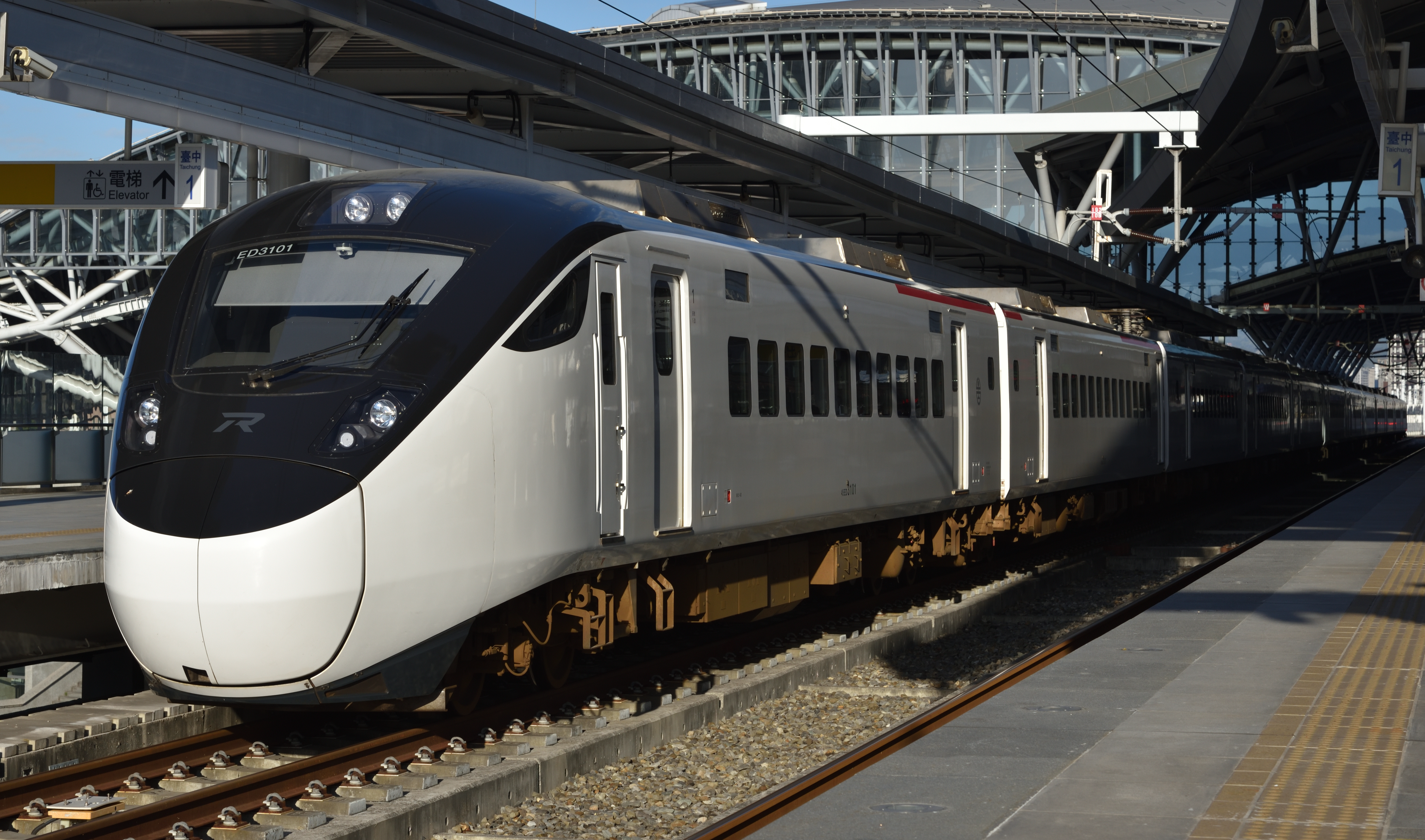
An EMU3000 series Tze-Chiang Limited Express train arriving at Taichung Station

=== Regular services ===
English	Chinese	Description	Reserved seats	Standard fare
Local	區間	Short to medium distance services which stop at all stations	None	NT$2.18/km
Fast local	區間快	Short to medium services which skip some stops	None	NT$2.18/km
Chu-kuang	莒光	Long haul services which skip some stops	Available	NT$2.61/km
Tze-chiang	自強	Long distance services which stop at major stations	Available	NT$3.39/km
Taroko	太魯閣	Long haul services with few stops and use tilting (excluding Xin Tze-chiang) trains to minimise travel times	Required	NT$3.39/km
Puyuma	普悠瑪	Long haul services with few stops and use tilting (excluding Xin Tze-chiang) trains to minimise travel times	Required	NT$3.39/km
Xin Tze-Chiang	新自強	Long haul services with few stops and use tilting (excluding Xin Tze-chiang) trains to minimise travel times	Required	NT$3.39/km

=== Retired services ===
- Kuang-hua express (光華號) Operated using the DR2700 series from 1966 to 1979. It set the TR's pre-electrification speed record.
- Kuan-kuang express (台鐵觀光號) Operated using locomotive hauled coaches from 1961 to 1978. Some trains in this service featured dining cars, and it was Taiwan Railways' premier service between its introduction in 1961 and the introduction of the Chu-kuang Express in 1970.
- Limited express (對號車) came in two iterations:
  - As part of its premier service, starting April 1949, TRA offered assigned seating in the first class coach on the morning express departing daily from Taipei (train no. 1) and Kaohsiung (no. 2); in October, this extended to second and third class. In November, this express was elevated to a limited express (特快對號車) after cutting its running time, becoming the first ever in Taiwan to be so ranked. After the mono-class reform of 1953, the train consisted of a parlor car (erstwhile first class), express coaches (erstwhile second class), and dining coach serving western food. The whole rake was replaced with the SP32700 class recliner coach (坐臥兩用車) in September, which had 52 seats over a 20 m (66 ft) body (more spacious than 17 m (56 ft) express coaches with 64 seats, thus attracting a higher fare). When the SP32750 class (very similar to SP32700) launched in 1961, it was rebranded as the Kuan-kuang express (above).
    - Train no. 1 ran under the monicker Cheng-kung Express (成功號), and no. 2 under Ming-chuang Express (銘傳號); these named trains commemorated Koxinga and Liu Mingchuan, ostensibly owing to their role in the development of Taiwan.
  - The better-known "Limited Express" (對號特快) commenced in January 1959 as trains nos. 3501/3502 between Taipei and Taichung, using SP32300 coaches with reversible seats. TRA drastically increased service frequency under this category between 1966 and 1970 when SP32400, SP32450, SP32550, SP32600, and SP32700 class coaches were launched; all these had 64 seats over a 20 m (66 ft) body. This service was phased out in 1988 as it lacked air conditioning and appeared less competitive than services with it.
- Equality express (平快車) commenced in April 1951, departing daily around noon from Taipei (train no. 3) and Kaohsiung (no. 4). This name was initially specific to the two services with rakes of five TP32200 coaches, bought with US aid, plus dining coach. The monicker "Equality" referred to their mono-class rakes, as opposed to the multi-class ranks normal at the time. Eventually, TRA began to replicate mono-class services with second class coaches that were judged similar to the TP32200 coaches, extending the monicker "Equality" to them as well. TRA abolished multi-class services entirely in December 1953, so all services consisting of second class coaches became known as Equality expresses. TRA increased service frequency under this category until its withdrawal in 2005 and replacement with the Fast Local Train.
  - At least when the service began, the quantity of tickets available was fixed, thus theoretically ensuring all passengers had seats, though assigned seating was not offered for these services.
- Ordinary (普通車): As a rule, ordinary trains stop at all stations, have no air conditioning, and are the least expensive. Assigned seating is not available. Under Japanese rule, stopping trains existed in both loco-hauled (long distance) and gasoline railcar variants, continuing after Retrocession of Taiwan. Prior to the mono-class reform of 1953, long-distance stopping trains typically consisted of second and third class coaches, with one service per day consisting of all three classes. Afterwards, stopping trains consisted solely of third class coaches (henceforth known as "ordinary coaches"). At the time, third class coaches had unpadded wooden bay seats, but such inferior conditions were improved from 1957 by the introduction of commuter coaches with padded longitudinal seats. Over time, long-distance stopping trains were phased out in favour of express trains, with remaining services truncated and oriented towards commuters.

=== Chu-kuang Express ===
In 1970, the Taiwan Railways Administration solicited equipment loans from the World Bank to increase transport capacity, the most important passenger vehicle is the 35SP32850 class, purchased from a consortium led by Japan's Hitachi, for a total of 27 vehicles.

On 3 February 1970, Chu-kuang service was initiated with Trains #1011 through #1014 on the West Coast line between Taipei and Taichung, hauled by EMD G22 class diesels (TR classification R100 class). Fares were set at three times the per-mile cost of ordinary local service, as much as NT$117 for certain origin-destination pairs. On 20 February of the same year, the service was initiated between Taipei and Kaohsiung.

The first Chu-kuang Expresses in the 1970s used a variety of different vehicles; although the models vary, but the body are universally white with blue line, with one door per side, and in the interior there are carpets and velvet sofa seats. After the completion of the West Coast line electrification project in 1978, all coach bodies were fully painted into orange livery, and service continued to grow.

1986 saw the introduction of rooftop air-conditioning type Chu-kuang coaches (10200 series), like the previous launch of 35SPK2200 on the Fu-Hsing Express, the air conditioner is moved to the stainless steel lightweight roof, and each coach was outfitted with a single door per side (manually operated). In addition, these Chu-kuang saw introduction of TR's first disability-accessible coach, the FPK11300 type.

== Rolling stock ==
TR uses a variety of railway vehicles to provide both freight and passenger service.

=== Electric multiple units ===
Name	Description	Manufacturer(s)	Image	Notes
EMU3000	Intercity Tze-chiang Express	Hitachi Rail		
TEMU2000	Intercity Puyuma Express	Nippon Sharyo		
TEMU1000	Intercity Taroko Express	Hitachi Rail		
EMU900	Local commuter service	Hyundai Rotem		
EMU800	Local commuter service	Nippon Sharyo; TRSC		
EMU700	Local commuter service	Nippon Sharyo; TRSC		
EMU500	Local commuter service	Daewoo Heavy Industries		

=== Diesel multiple units ===
Name	Description	Manufacturer(s)	Image	Notes
DR3100	Intercity Tze-Chiang Express DMU	Nippon Sharyo; Tang Eng Iron Works		
45DR1000	Branch Line DMU	Nippon Sharyo; Tang Eng Iron Works		
DR3200	Branch Line Hybrid DMU	TRSC		Expected to enter service in July 2026, Replacing 45DR1000.

=== Electric locomotives ===
Name	Description	Manufacturer(s)	Image	Notes
E500	Tze-Chiang Express locomotive Chu-Kuang Express locomotive	Toshiba		Replacing E1000 and E200-E400.
E1000	Tze-Chiang Express locomotive	Union Carriage & Wagon; Alstom		Currently kept as reserve locomotive.
E200, E300, E400	Chu-Kuang Express locomotive	General Electric		To be replaced by E500.

=== Diesel locomotives ===
Name	Description	Manufacturer(s)	Image	Notes
R200	Freight locomotive	Stadler Rail		Replacing R20 (TRA),R100 (TRA).
R100 (TRA), R150, R180, R190	Freight locomotive	Electro-Motive Diesel		
R20 (TRA)	Freight locomotive	Electro-Motive Diesel		To be replaced by R200.

=== Tourism trains ===
Name	Description	Manufacturer(s)	Image	Notes
Future (train)	Excursion train	TRSC (refurbish)		
Breezy Blue	Excursion train	Ching Yang Railway Machinery (refurbish)		
Haifeng	Excursion train	Shyh Jia Enterprise (refurbish)		
Shanlan	Excursion train	Shyh Jia Enterprise (refurbish)		
DR2300	Excursion train	TRSC (refurbish)		

- Departmental vehicles: TR has various engineering vehicles made by various companies such as Plasser & Theurer, Windhoff, Enviri, Geismar
- Diesel hydraulic switching locomotives: Originally purchased in the 1970s for the narrow-gauge East Coast Mainline, re-gauged for 1,067 mm (3 ft 6 in) after the line was converted. Mostly used for switching duties.
- Push-pull trains (Taiwan Railway E1000 series): High-capacity express passenger trains. The locomotives were built by UCW of South Africa, while the carriages were built by Hyundai of Korea. Extra cars for the push-pull trainsets were manufactured by Rotem.
- Hauled coaching stock: Express passenger stock from Japan and Korea, as well as by Taiwanese companies.
- Freight wagons: Gondolas, covered hoppers, boxcars, refrigerated boxcars, livestock cars, flatcars, mail cars, etc.

== See also ==
- Rail transport in Taiwan
- Transportation in Taiwan
- Taiwan High Speed Rail
- Taipei Railway Workshop
- Taiwan Railway Bento
