= Taiwan Railways Administration Elevatizion =

Project of Taiwan's rail transport body

TRA Elevation (Chinese: 臺鐵高架化; pinyin: Táitiě Gāojià Huà) is one of the methods used for Taiwan's "three-dimensional transport program", to solve the problem of railway lines barricading urban areas into pieces and causing traffic bottlenecks due to safety concerns of ground-level crossings, and limited overpasses or underpasses. The urban section of the original ground-level railway is elevated, or new sections of the tracks are built elevated from the start. Most of the railway treated this way is part of the national railway network in long-distance passenger or commuter rail rather than the urban rail transit system.

Other three-dimensional transport programs in addition to the "elevated" include: underground railway, constructing new highway crossings above the railroad, the construction of an outer ring railway to bypass urban areas, establishing new train stations in urban fringes as well as a series of programs to solve the problem of urban railway separation.

Taiwan Railways Administration operates routes for western Taiwan urban area, ground railways and influence on road traffic submitted improvement projects, via Ministry of Transportation Railway Reconstruction Engineering Bureau (originally named "Ministry of Transportation Taipei urban area Underground Railway Engineering Bureau") and Taiwan Railway Administration (Taoyuan Elevated Railway) to office, part of engineering has been listed in New Ten Major Construction Projects of TRA MRTizion project.

== Shortcomings ==
- Elevated railways cannot be completely silent, vibration disturbing nearby residents is greater than that of the Mass Transit Railway (MTR), both must have sufficient clearance or soundproof walls to insulate from the noise.
- The elevated railway technology can not effectively solve the integration of both sides of the development, only to reduce the gap.
- Scenic issue for some citizens.

== Advantages ==
- In most cases, cheaper than underground railways
- Overhead rail is more often feasible than tunnels
- Lower maintenance costs
- No ventilation system or issues that come with it (maintenance, safety, etc.)
- Not affected by floods that cause disruption to the train service
- Allows high-speed travel
- Easy to expand
- Construction footprint is smaller than that of underground development

== Completed ==
In recent years, elevation of TRA line segments has been completed at the following locations:

- Mountain Line (Taichung Line) improvement in 1998.
- Sijhi (Xizhi), Taipei in 2006, and Tri-track has been completed in October 2013.
- Houlong on coast line in 2005.
- Part of Yilan Station and Dongshan Station in 2005–2007.
- Linbian, in January 2012.
- Yuanlin (Chinese), completed on November 2, 2014
- Pingtung-Chaozhou (Chinese), completed on August 23, 2015
- Taichung (Chinese), goes in operational at October 16, 2016

== Under Consideration ==
- Chiayi (Chinese)

== Planning ==
- Yilan (Chinese)
- Changhua (Chinese)
- Dajia-Wuri section of Coast Line, and planned to expand to double track
