= Regional rail =

Inter-urban passenger train with frequent stops

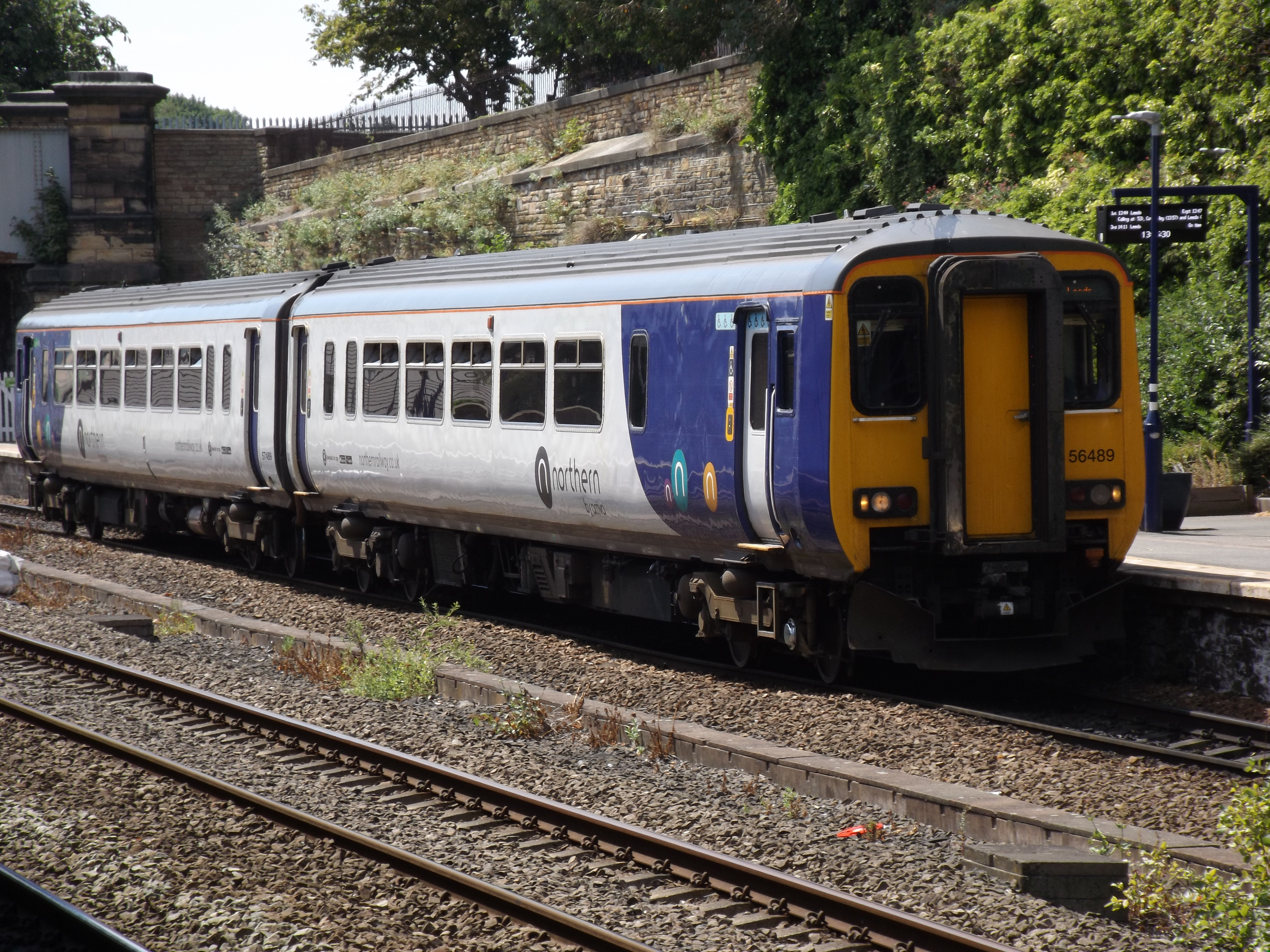
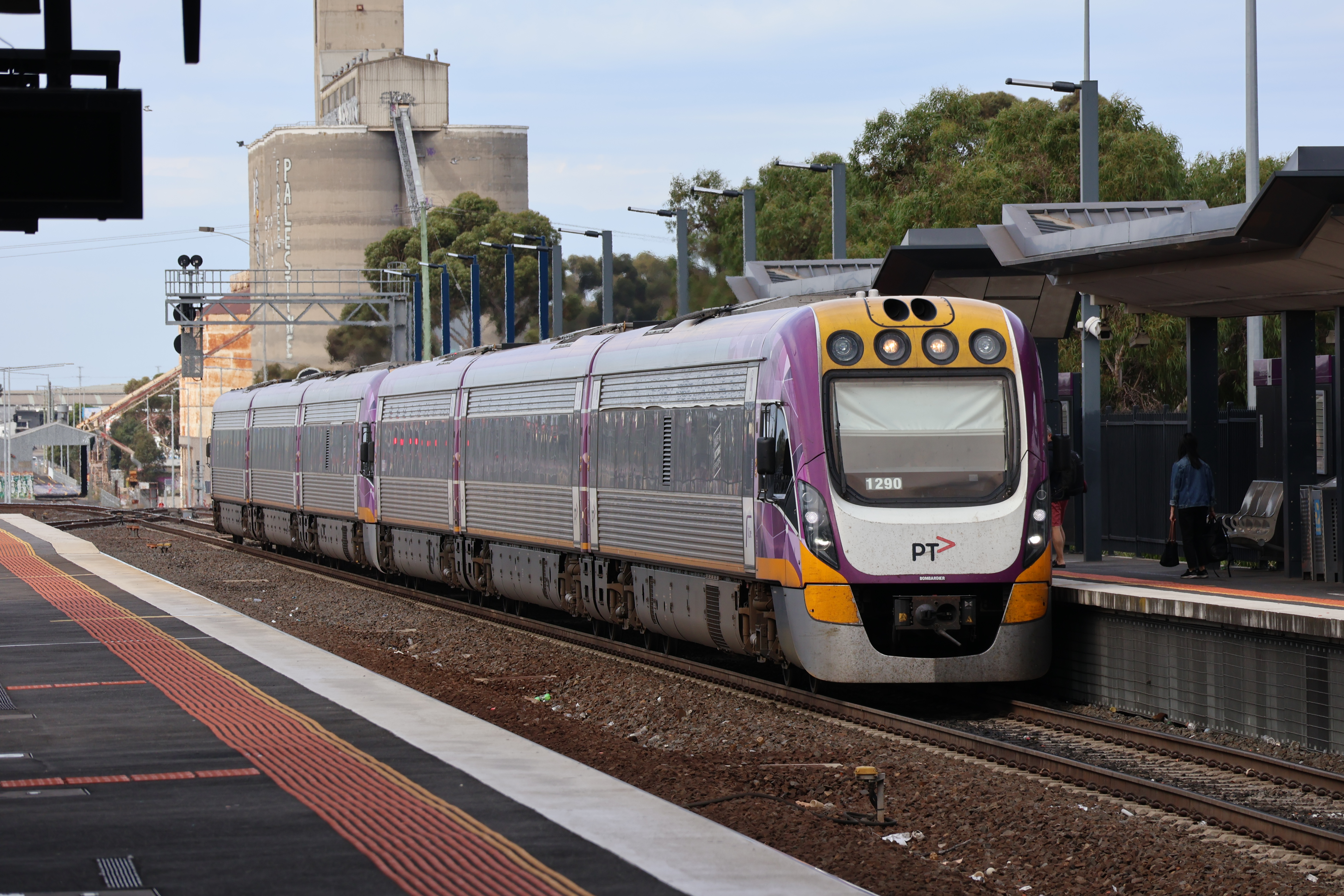
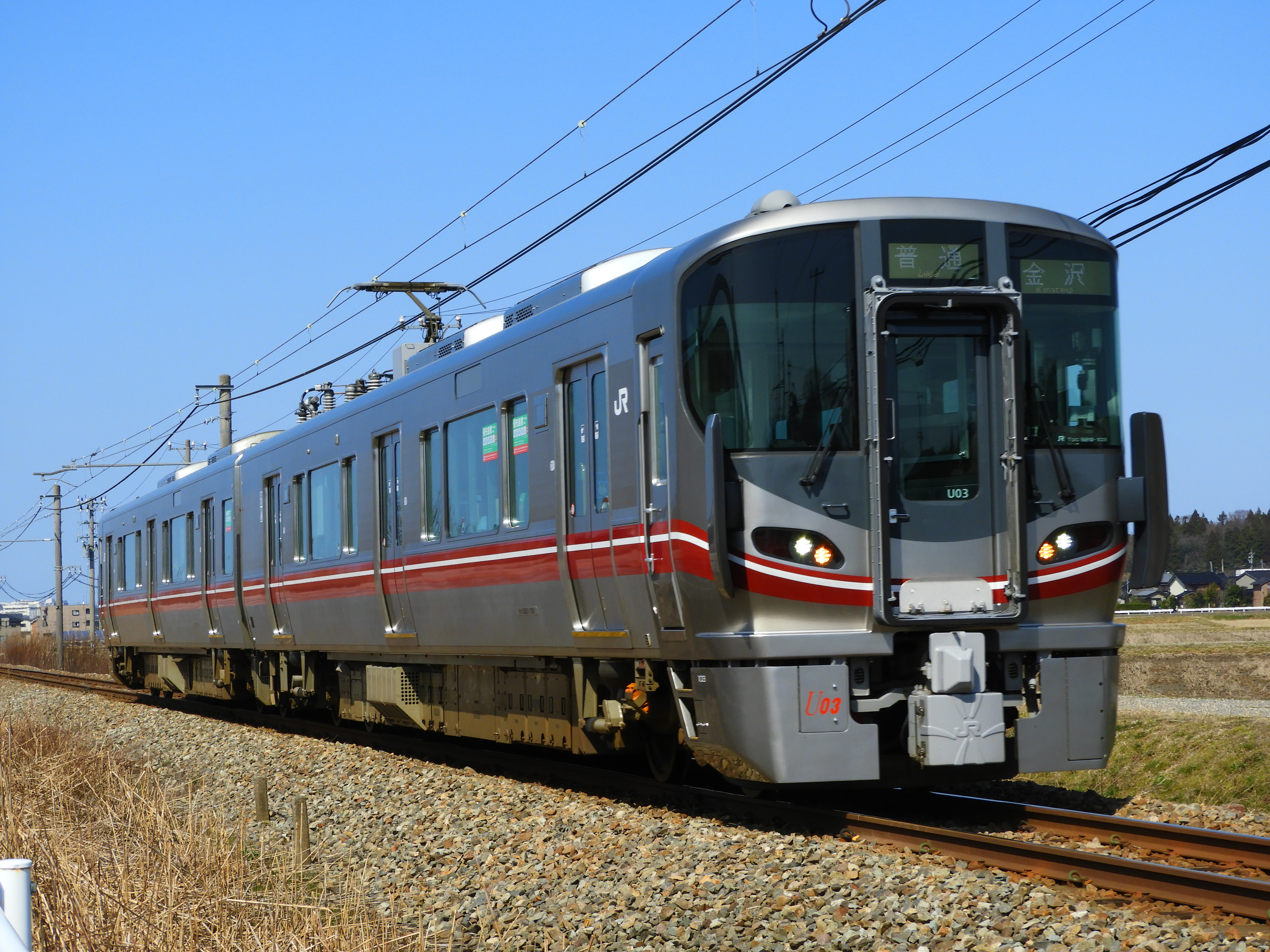
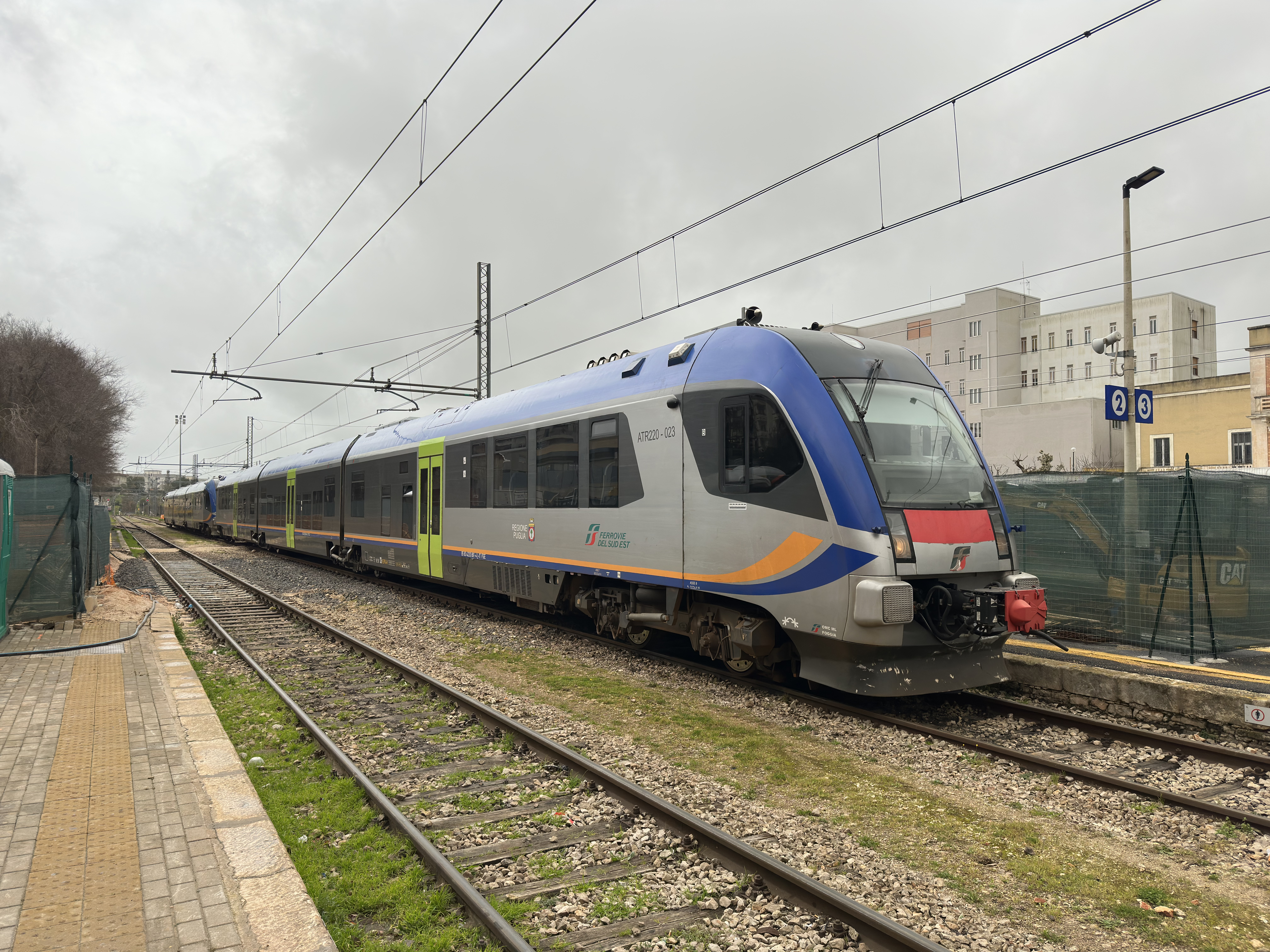
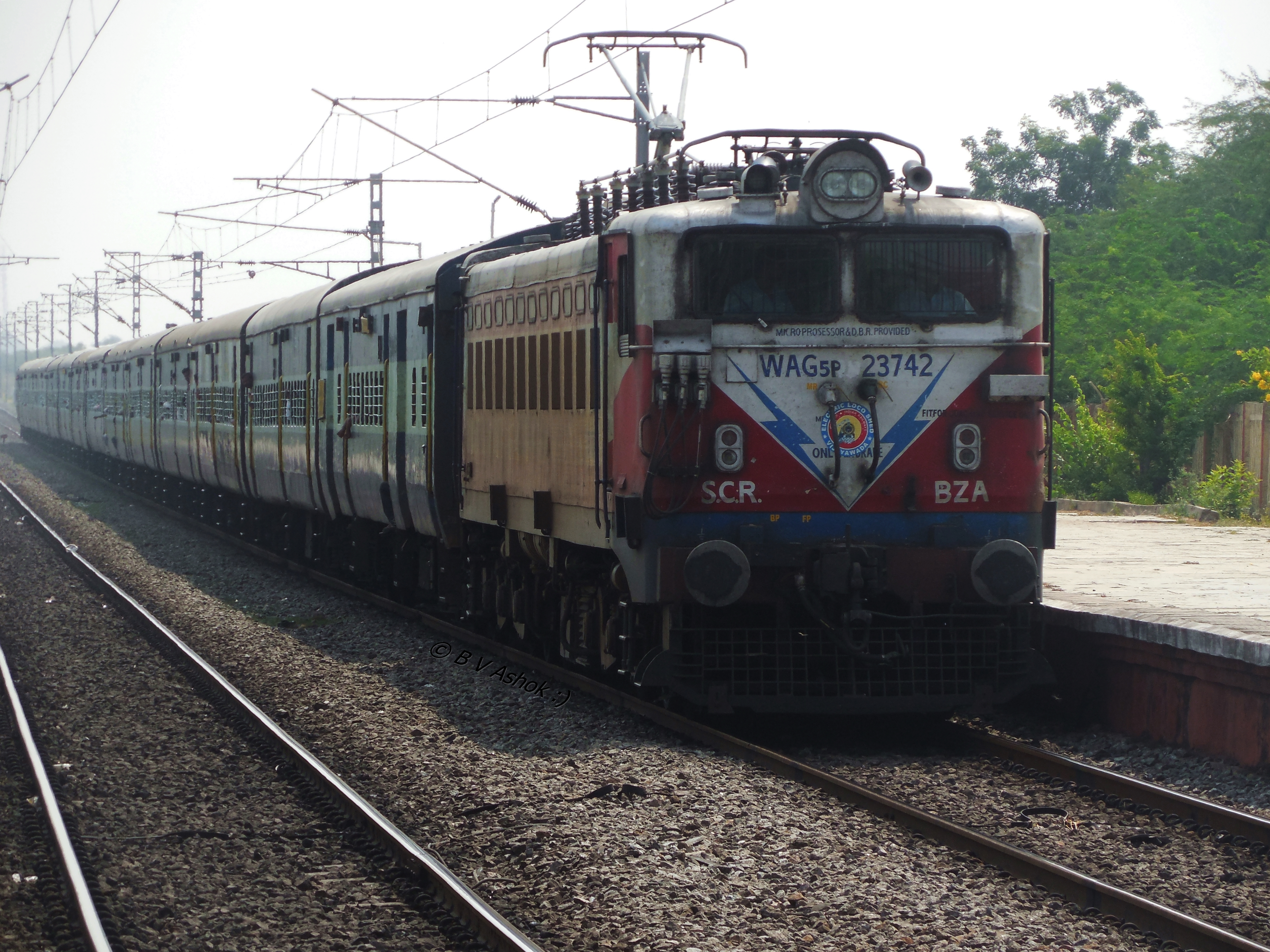
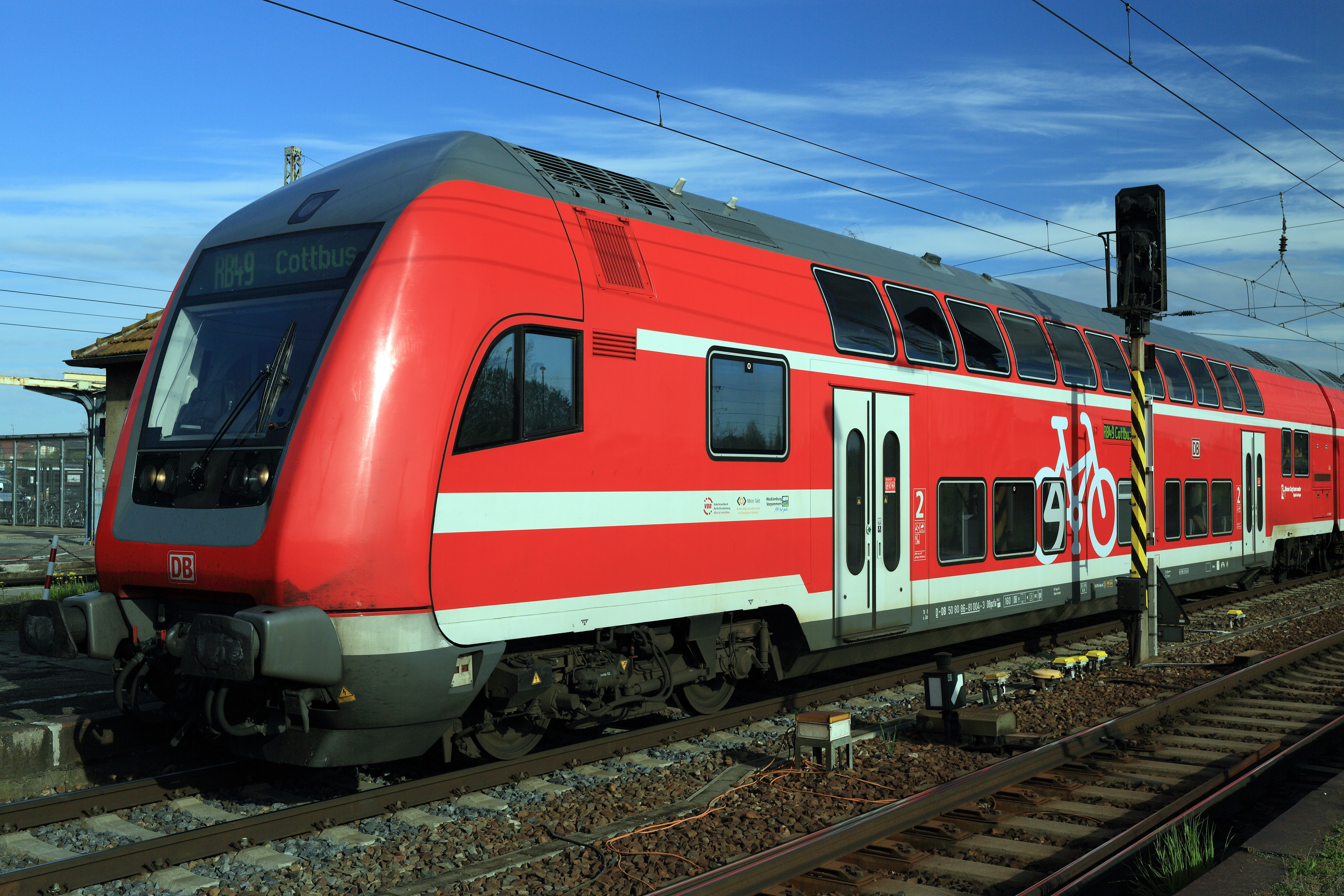
Clockwise from top left:
- A Northern Trains Class 156 at Dewsbury station, England
- A V/Line VLocity at Sunshine station, Australia
- An Ferrovie del Sud Est Pesa Atribo at Martina Franca station, Italy
- A Deutsche Bahn DBpzfa double-decker carriage at Falkenberg (Elster) station, Germany
- An Indian Railways WAG-5P arrives at Odela station, India
- A West Japan Railway 521-100 series passing between Nose and Unoke, Japan

Regional rail is a public rail transport service that operates between towns and cities. These trains operate with more stops than inter-city rail, and unlike commuter rail, operate beyond the limits of urban areas, connecting smaller cities and towns.

"Regional rail" is sometimes used as a synonym for "commuter rail", while in other contexts "commuter rail" refers to systems that primarily or only offer service during rush hour while "regional rail" refers to systems that offer all-day service. In Europe, regional trains have their own category, often abbreviated to R (RB in Germany) or L (for local train).

== Characteristics ==
Regional rail provides services that link settlements to one another, unlike commuter rail, which links locations within a single urban area. Unlike inter-city services, regional trains stop at more stations and serve smaller communities. They may share routes with inter-city services, providing service to settlements that inter-city trains skip, or be the sole service on routes not busy enough to justify inter-city service.

Regional rail services are much less likely to be profitable than inter-city, so they often require government funding. This is mainly because many passengers use monthly passes, which lowers the price per ride, and the lower average speed results in less distance traveled, meaning less ticket revenue per hour of operation. Subsidies are justified on social or environmental grounds, and also because regional rail services often act as feeders for more profitable inter-city lines.

Some services are somewhere between regional and inter-city, like the Oresundtrain (between Copenhagen and three cities in Sweden, all over 3 hours away), with a stopping pattern like a regional train and pass prices that attract working commuters.

== List of regional rail in different countries ==
This list describes the terms used for regional rail in various countries, as described above.

Country	Railway company	Name	English translation and notes
Algeria	SNTF	Inter-villes / Réseau de lignes de banlieue	The "Inter-villes" autorail is the regional train in Algeria, and the "Réseau de lignes de banlieue" (commuter rail) is the suburban train of the big Algerian cities such as Algiers, Oran, Constantine, and Annaba
Australia	Queensland Rail	Traveltrain	Operates long distance trains in Queensland out of Brisbane. (Except The Inlander)
Australia	NSW TrainLink		Operates regional and intercity trains in NSW out of Sydney or from Newcastle. It also operates interstate rail services into Victoria and Queensland.
Australia	Transwa		Operates regional rail services in Western Australia to Kalgoorlie and Bunbury from Perth.
Australia	V/Line		Operates regional and intercity rail services in Victoria out of Melbourne.
Austria	ÖBB	Regionalzug	"Regional train". Calls at every stop. 2nd class only.
Belgium	NMBS/SNCB	lokale trein/train local	"Local train"
Catalonia, Spain	Rodalies de Catalunya and FGC	Regional, Regional Exprés and Mitjana Distància	Until 2008, Regional Exprés was officially known as Catalunya Exprés. In 2024, FGC will take over the R12 line of Rodalies de Catalunya, where Renfe Operadora currently operates the trains.
China	China Railway	市郊旅客列车	"Suburban Railway" (S-series trains), not common. "Inter-City EMU" trains (C-series trains) may be more frequent than Suburban Railways and are used for commuting.
Cuba	National Railway Company of Cuba	Ferrocarriles Nacionales de Cuba	"Regional train", not frequent and extremely unreliable.
Czech Republic	ČD	Osobní vlak, Spěšný vlak	"Passenger train", "Semi-fast train"
Denmark	DSB, Arriva	Regionaltog	"Regional train". This category is used for trains that usually call at every stop.
Finland	VR Group	Taajamajuna (Finnish) (FI), Regionaltåg (Swedish)	"Conurbation train". Station announcements use "regional train".
France	SNCF	TER, Transilien	Transport Express Régional (TER) in most French regions, Transilien for Île-de-France
Germany	DB and others	Regionalbahn (RB); Regional-Express (RE)	"Regionalbahn": trains calling at every stop outside urban areas. "Regional-Express": semi-fast regional trains that stop at fewer stations than regular Regionalbahn services.
India	IR	Passenger train	"Passenger train" or simply as "Passenger". This category is used for trains stopping at every railway station along their route.
India	NCRTC	RRTS	"Regional Rapid Transit Systems" that offer semi-high-speed connectivity within the regions.
Indonesia	KAI	Kereta Ekonomi Lokal	"Local Economy Train". This category is used for trains stopping at every railway station along their route to a major city within an operational area. Exceptionally, when operating in an overlapping pattern with Jakarta's commuter rail, the train stops only at certain stations.
Italy	Trenitalia	Treno regionale (IT)	"Regional train". This category is used for trains that call at every stop or at most stops. Previously, regional trains were named treni locali (local trains).
Italy	Trenord	Treno regionale	"Regional train". This category is used for trains that call at every stop or at most stops. These trains are operated by Trenord, the regional train company for Lombardy.
Italy	Ferrovie del Sud Est	Treno regionale	"Regional train". This category is used for trains that call at every stop or at most stops. These trains are operated by Ferrovie del Sud Est, the regional train company for Apulia.
Japan	various	普通列車 (JA) 地方鉄道 (JA) ローカル線 (JA)	"local train", "local line" (ローカル=rōkaru=local). Used to refer to lines outside major urban areas that are not trunk routes or Shinkansen.
Luxembourg	CFL	Regionalbunn (LB), RegionalExpress	Regionalbunn ("Regional train") is used for trains calling at nearly every stop, unlike the Regional Express
Netherlands	NS and others	Sprinter (NS)/Stoptrein (others) (NL)	"Sprinter" or "Stopping train". Connects nearby cities, stops at (almost) all stations, and is the basic local train service.
New Zealand	Capital Connection & Wairarapa Connection, also Te Huia	Regional rail	Regional Train transport in the North Island, to be replaced by New Zealand BEMU class electric multiple unit in 2030; except for Te Huia.
Nigeria	Abuja Rail Mass Transit	Regional rail	Regional Train transport system in the Federal Capital Territory of Nigeria.
North Korea	Korean State Railway	조선민주주의인민공화국 철도성	"Regional train". It is a slower, mostly electrified, regional, long-distance rail system.
Norway	Vy	Regiontog	"Regional train". In 2022, there was a change in terminology. After this, Regiontog trains stop at every station, except in large urban areas, where they skip stations and "Lokaltog" (commuter trains) stop at every station. Before 2022, this term Regiontog was used for medium- and long-distance trains. Long-distance trains (now called "Fjerntog") have fairly frequent stops, since they are also used for regional travel and do not try to compete with air travel as the railways are winding and slow.
Poland	Polregio	Pociąg REGIO (PL)	"REGIO train"
Portugal	Comboios de Portugal	Comboio Regional (PT)	"Comboio Regional" stops at stations where a person has bought a ticket to that stop. Connects various towns and villages to big cities around the coast.
Romania	CFR	Regio	Shortened "Regional" (formerly, Personal)
Serbia	Srbijavoz	Putnički voz (Passenger train)	Short-, medium-, and long-distance stopping trains that stop at all stations between two points. These trains are usually the slowest in Serbia, but are most commonly used because of their low price compared to Brzi voz ("Fast train", stopping only at major stations) and Inter Siti Srbija ("InterCity Serbia", similar to Brzi voz, except that most are international). Most Putnički voz trains consist of one ŽS 441/ŽS 444 locomotive and one to three coaches or ŽS 412 EMU. There are plans to replace ŽS 412s with new ŽS 413 sets. Now it is called Regio.
Spain	Renfe Operadora	Media Distancia	"Medium Distance" (formerly, Regionales).
Sweden	SJ and others	Regionaltåg (SV)	"Regional train". Public transport organizations operate both local and regional trains in Sweden, with similar tickets in both cases, and monthly pass prices are competitive with car commuting. In some cases, single-ride tickets are sold mainly by the operator. SJ sells tickets to all regional trains, in parallel with the main operator.
Switzerland	SBB-CFF-FFS and others	Regionalzug (German); Train régional (French); Treno regionale (Italian)	"Regional Train". Replaces the former terms Personenzug (German, "passenger train") and train omnibus (French) with a more precise description and a word that is essentially the same in all three national languages. Starting in December 2004, the abbreviation Regio was introduced for all languages. Trains named Regio call at every stop.
Taiwan	Taiwan Railway Corporation	區間車 (Chinese)	Local trains stop at every station on main lines; exclusive class on passenger branch lines. Trainsets include: EMU500, EMU600, EMU700, EMU800, EMU900 and 45DR1000 (TRA).
Turkey	TCDD Taşımacılık	Bölgesel Tren	"Regional Train". Stops at (almost) all stations, the basic local train service.
United Kingdom (Great Britain)	British Rail (1982–1997) : GBR (Nationalisation ongoing)	Regional Railways	Train services outside London and South East which are not InterCity trains.

== See also ==
- Commuter rail
- Elektrichka
- Passenger rail terminology
- Train categories in Europe
