= EMU400 series =

Former passenger train in Taiwan

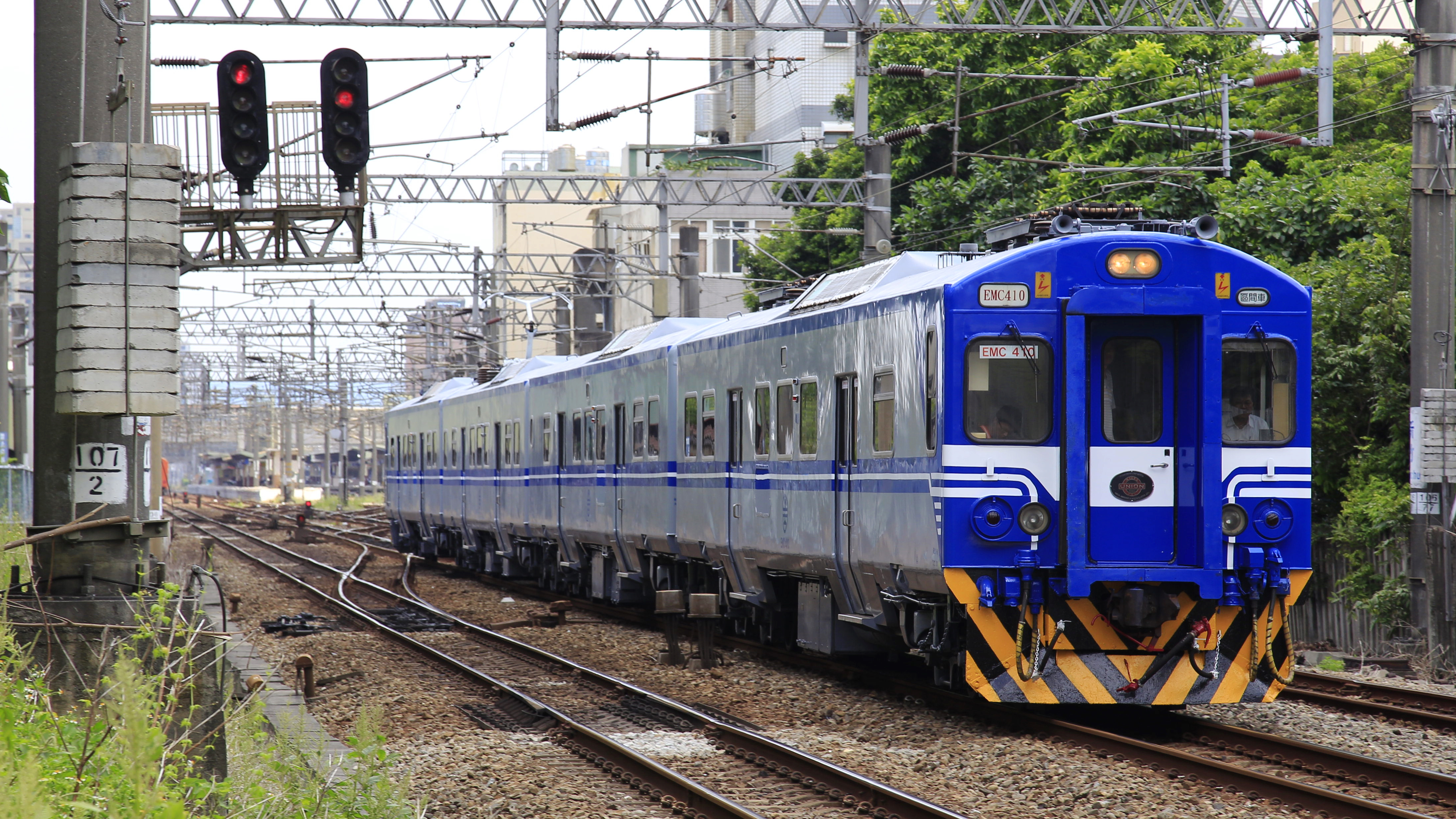
- EMU410 passing the south end of Hsinchu Station, 2016.
- In service: 1990-2015
- Manufacturer: Union Carriage & Wagon
- Constructed: 1990
- Number built: 12 sets, 48 cars in total
- Formation: 4 cars per set
- Capacity: 60 seated, 120 standing
- Operator: Taiwan Railways Administration

Specifications
- Car length: 20.09 m (65 ft 11 in)
- Width: 2.880 m (9 ft 5 3/8 in)
- Height: EP car: 4.17 m (13 ft 8 1/8 in), Others: 3.932 m (12 ft 10 3/4 in)
- Maximum speed: normal operation: 110 km/h (68 mph), designed with a max speed of 120 km/h (75 mph)
- Power output: 1,920 kW (2,570 hp)
- Electric system: 25 kV 60 Hz Overhead
- Track gauge: 1,067 mm (3 ft 6 in)

The Taiwan Railway EMU400 was an electric train purchased by Taiwan Railways Administration from Union Carriage & Wagon of South Africa in 1990. It was the first generation of commuter electric trains for Taiwan Railways. During its operating life, a total of 48 vehicles in 12 groups were used on commuter train services between Hsinchu and Keelung, replacing the non-air-conditioned commuter buses formerly used along the route. Following the introduction of the EMU800 series, all EM400 trains were withdrawn from service in 2015.

== History of introduction ==
When the EMU400 was introduced in 1990, the typical trains used by Taiwan Railways for commuter services were simple express units without air conditioning, despite the prevalence of railway electrification at the time. The Edmondson railway ticket system was still used. In order to cooperate with Taiwan Railway MRT and improve ride comfort, plans were made to introduce an electric EMU train as a replacement for the diesel express that ran between Keelung and northern Hsinchu. The EMU 400 had a demonstration run on November 9, 1990 with an invitation to the general public to ride the train, before opening for official service the next day. In November 2006, a new type of local train was launched and the fare system used on the Fu-Hsing Semi-Express was adopted.

== Technical specifications and construction details ==
=== Overview ===
An EMU 400 trainset was composed of groups of 4 cars: EM cars (driving motor cars), EP cars (electric cars), ET cars (trailers) and EMC cars (driving motor cars, with a driver’s cabin). Up to 4 groups of 16 vehicles could be connected in operation. The traction motors were installed in the EM and EMC cars, the pantograph was located on the EP cars, and generators were installed in the ET cars. There were additional ET cars, so that the previous EMU200 and EMU300 three-car grouping method was changed to a group of four, with the same design later extended to EMU500, EMU600 and subsequent models.

=== Appearance ===
The train’s initial livery had it painted in ultramarine blue (F09, Ultramarine, NCS color code 3355-R80B) and cloud white (G80, Cloud white, NCS color code 0704-G38Y) according to the South African national standard SANS 1091. The Taiwan Railway Administration emblem, car number and other identifiers also use ultramarine blue. The lower edge on both sides of the car body is designed to be curved inward, which is a feature of this model. The original design of each car body has 3 doors on each side, but the final design adopted has only 2 doors on each side, located close to the center of the carriage. The automatic door and station display on each carriage – the first to be seen on Taiwan Railway equipment – is a black background with white characters. After several overhauls of the train, the ultramarine livery was gradually changed to dark blue, and the station display board was changed to a red LED. In 2010, in conjunction with a platform height enhancement project, the train also saw renovation of the steps in the door openings, the last modification to the train.

=== Interior ===
When the train was introduced, it used grab handles of a similar design to those used on the Taipei City bus in the 1990s. The interior had olive green fabric seat fabric and a black floor. Later, the grab handles were changed to be the same as those used in the EMU500 trains with a change of fabric on the seats. The fabric was replaced with the same dark green one used in the EMU500, and the floor was changed to a green pattern, similar to that used in the EMU500, but with a darker color. The cars also have floor columns near the doors and ceiling grab bars to accommodate a larger number of passengers. The center of the ceiling is equipped with a square grid pattern pointing in the direction of the operator, where the loudspeaker and the air conditioning’s return outlet are hidden. The air conditioning outlet is slightly widened, which is a unique feature of this type of car. The through-door between the carriages is a double-fold sliding door; it is the only model of Taiwan Railways equipment to adopt this design.

== Retirement ==
After the EMU400 trains were removed from regular service in October 2015, some were parked in Taiwan Railway's Qidu Yard. A few units were discovered to have been covered in graffiti. A railway official said the matter had been reported to the police.
