= Platform ticket =

Non-travel railway ticket

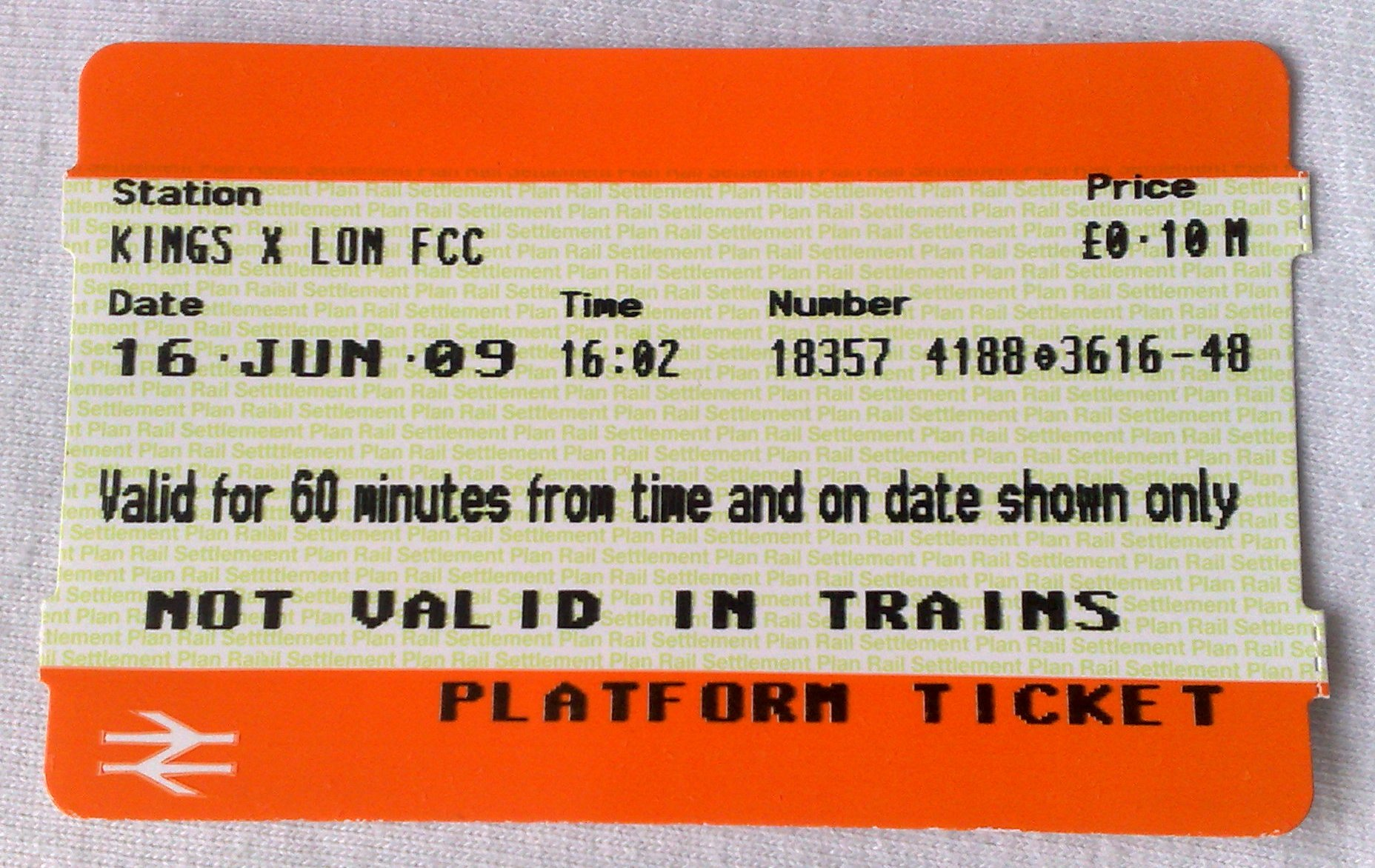
A platform ticket issued at Kings Cross railway station, valid for one hour

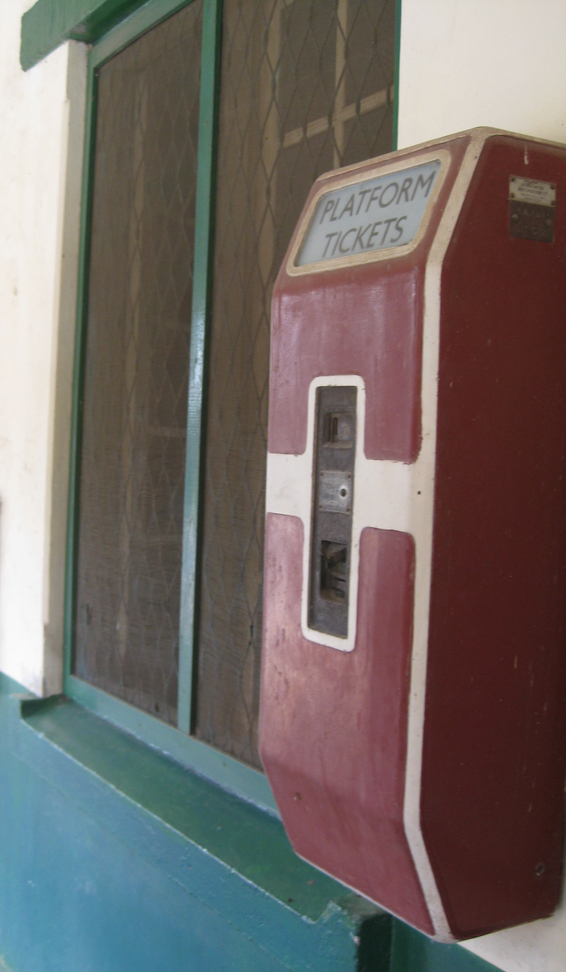
A disused platform ticket machine in Tanga, Tanzania

A platform ticket is a type of rail ticket issued by some rail transport systems, allowing the user to access the railway platforms of a train station, but not to board and travel on any train services. It allows non-travellers to enter the paid area of the station, for example to walk with their friends, associates and loved ones all the way to the passenger car at stations where the general public is not allowed on platforms. Platform tickets are also commonly used by train spotters to access areas of stations beyond ticket gates for photography and other activities related to their hobby. They vary in type: some may only allow limited access and a sharply limited time of usage, while others may have totally free access to enter the platform area. During peak usage hours or rush hours, the platforms may only be available for passengers who intend to travel.

== History ==
Platform tickets emerged in the 19th century. At that time passenger coaches had no internal corridor, as they have today. In order to inspect tickets, conductors had to move along the outside of the train while it was in motion. Although trains moved much slower than today, there were numerous accidents. Therefore, railway operators began to check the tickets on the platform before passengers boarded the train. Passing these checkpoints required either a ticket for travel or the platform ticket, which was only valid for access to the platform. After railcars were changed, people and conductors could move from carriage to carriage so checking the tickets outside the train was no longer necessary. Most railway transport systems abolished this in the second half of the 20th century. As soon as there were no more checks, the platform ticket was unnecessary and generally was abandoned. However, as there are now automated ticket barriers, railfans and trainspotters buy these tickets to get past the barriers and onto the platform.

Platform tickets like train tickets are collected. There are a number of clubs and societies that promote the hobby such as The Transport Ticket Society .

== Usage by country ==
=== China ===
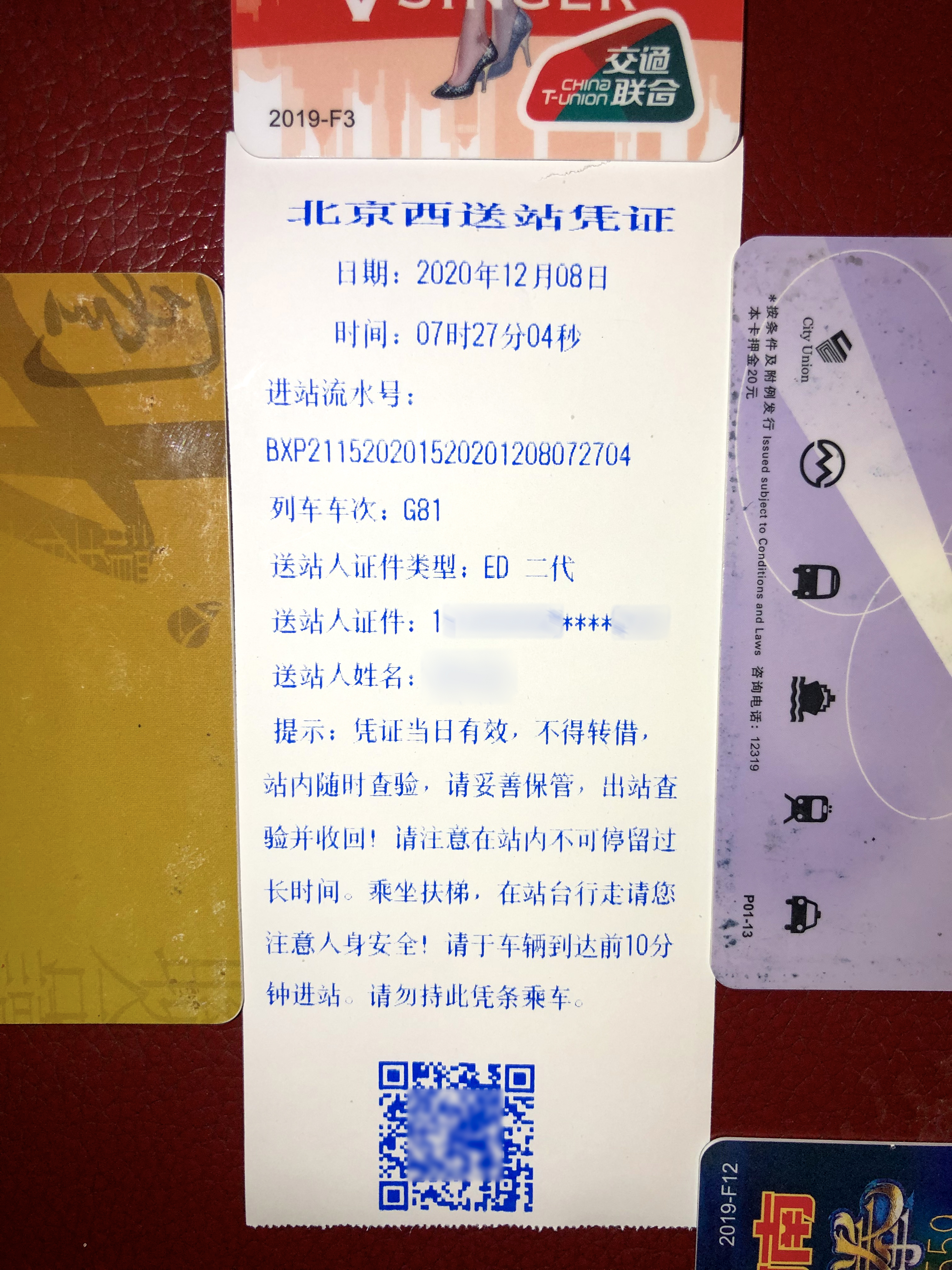
Permit to escort departure passengers at Beijing West railway station

China Railways ceased to issue platform tickets from 2014. At some major stations like Beijing West railway station, a person can still escort a passenger in need by applying for a permit with the escorter's ID card.

=== Germany ===
In Germany, the Royal Prussian Railway was the first carrier to introduce ticket checks on platforms in 1893. Other German railway operators soon followed. Platform checks and tickets were abolished in East Germany in 1970 and in West Germany in 1974. In some local transportation networks, however, they lasted longer. The last one in which they were used was the public transportation in Hamburg, where platform tickets had to be bought to access the platforms without a travel ticket until 2023. The price was 0.10 euros.

=== India ===
Platform ticket from Pune Junction, Indian Railways

A platform ticket for any railway station situated across India costs not more than ₹10 and is valid for not more than two hours. Tickets are issued from either ticketing counters and ATVMs on the railway station, or from Indian Railways' UTS app. If a passenger is caught by railway ticket checking staff at any platform without platform ticket or travelling ticket, passenger will be charged double the fare of the last train that arrived at / departed from that platform. The fare will be worked out on the basis of the last ticket checking station on the train's route.

=== Japan ===
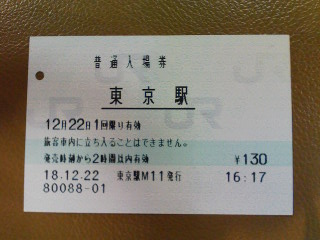
A platform ticket issued by JR East at Tokyo Station, Japan

Japan Railways Group (JR Group) companies sell platform tickets (入場券, nyūjōken) priced between 120 yen and 160 yen at all staffed stations and platform passes (定期入場券, teiki nyūjōken), which allow unlimited access to the platform area for one month, priced between 3,780 yen and 4,890 yen at limited stations. They do not allow holders to board trains. All staffed stations of JR East, JR Central and JR West, and stations of JR Hokkaido with automatic ticket gates limit the validity of the ticket to two hours from issuance; an additional fee is charged if the ticket holder exits the ticket gate after the two-hour period expires.

=== Taiwan ===
The Taiwan Railways Administration stopped selling platform tickets (月臺票/月台票) on 1 June 2013 to lend platform access certificate (月台出入證) on holding pictured identification documents.

1. Zhongli, Taichung, Chiayi, Tainan, Kaohsiung, Hualien and Yilan stations from the north, counterclockwise, would continue to sell platform tickets in addition to lending platform access passes.
2. A platform ticket or a platform access certificate allows staying in the paid area of a station for up to one hour. Staying longer requires the fare of starting mileage of Fu-Hsing Semi-Express and other train in the same level.
3. An electronic ticket used to enter and exit the same station is charged NT$14 within one hour, NT$112 within three hours, or NT$843 beyond 3 hours.

=== United Kingdom ===
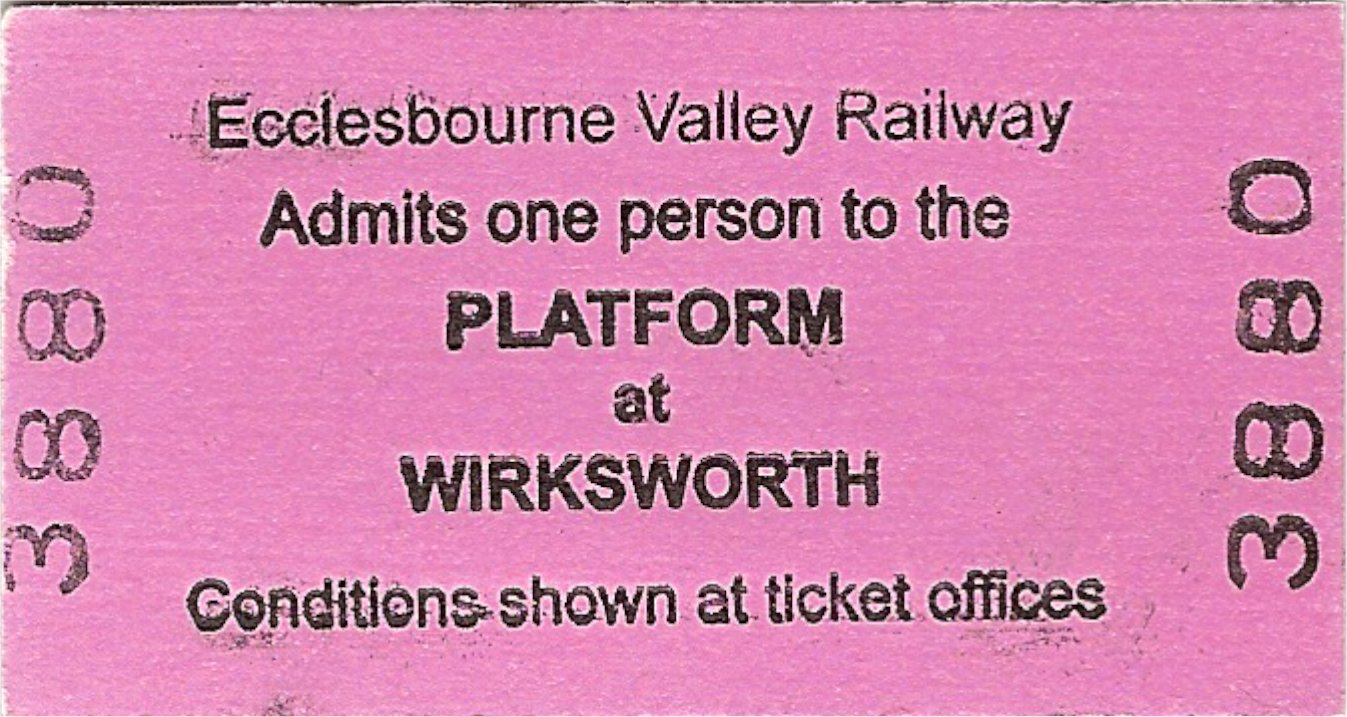
Platform ticket of Ecclesbourne Valley Railway, England

Platform tickets were in common use on the mainline network until the mid 20th century, and the majority of ticket offices are still equipped to issue them. The use of automated ticket barriers at stations has resulted in a renewed demand for platform tickets. Those wishing to assist a passenger onto a train, and rail enthusiasts in particular, are told that they may require a platform ticket for access to platforms. Another use of the tickets is to cross the River Thames in London along the platforms of Blackfriars station, which span the river.

They are valid for one hour and cost £0.10; the last price increase was in January 1988. Some heritage railways and museums issue platform tickets for admittance or as souvenirs.

Until 3 September 2023, the London Underground used to sell platform tickets, however, these were withdrawn, partly in line with TfL's wider aim of reducing the usage of paper tickets, and partly in an attempt to reduce maintenance on the ticket barriers . You can't buy a platform ticket for any London Underground station, with the exception of Southwark, in order to "maintain the customer flow".

=== United States ===
While not a platform ticket per se, Bay Area Rapid Transit charges a specialty excursion fare for entering and exiting the system within three hours at the same station.
