= Fu-Hsing Semi-Express =

Series of trains in Taiwan

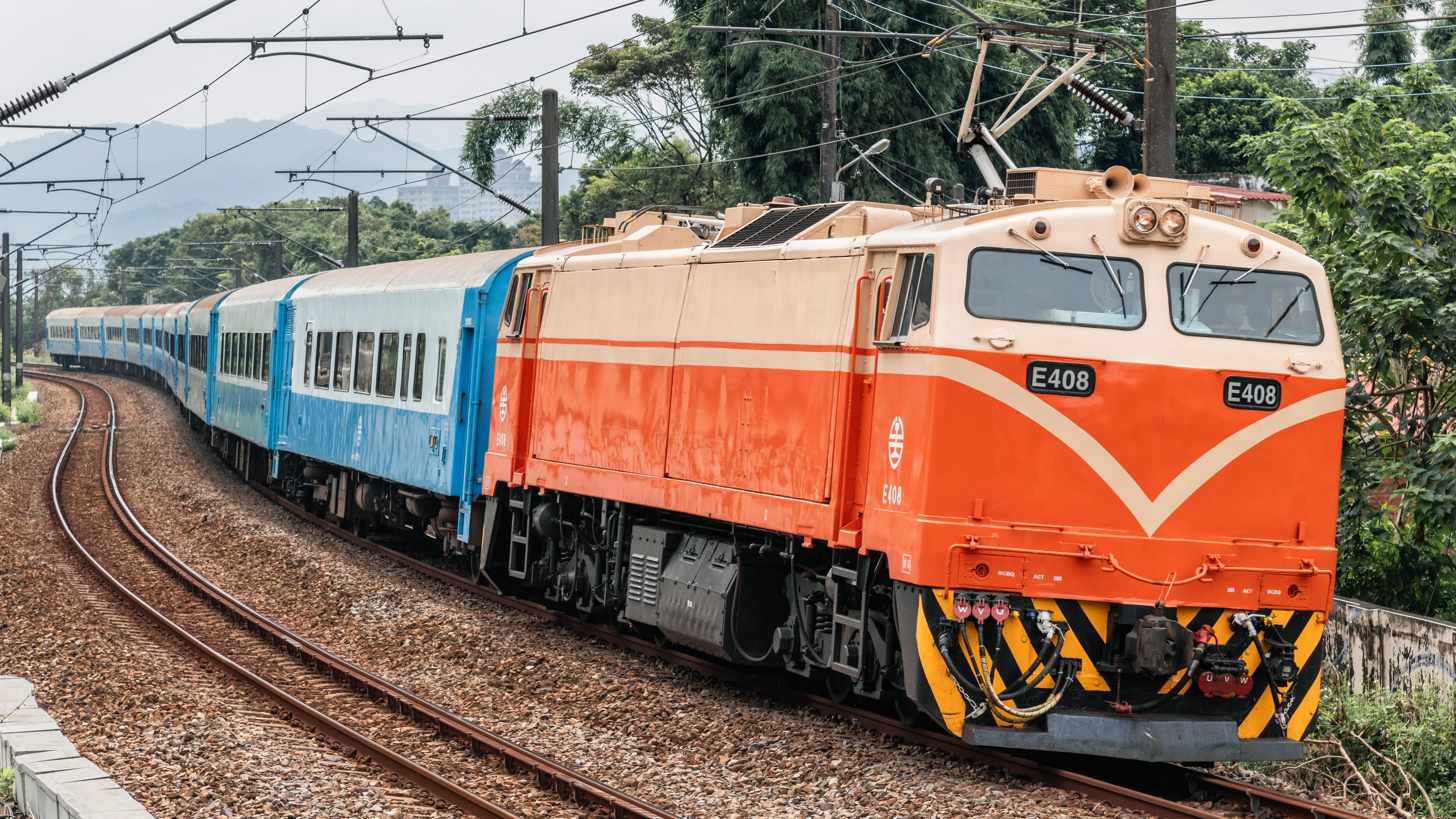
Fu-Hsing Semi-Express

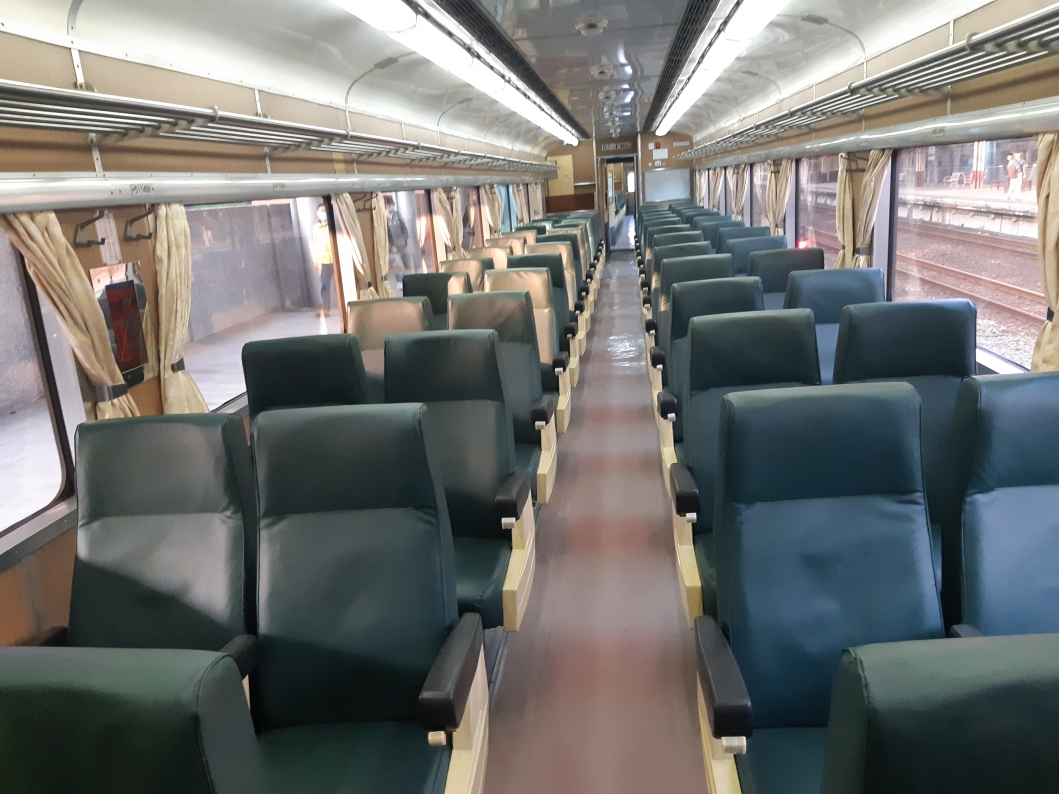
Interior of a carriage

The Fu-Hsing Semi-Express (Chinese: 復興號列車) was a series of trains operated by the Taiwan Railway Administration from 1981 to 2022. This service was originally called the "Air Conditioned Reserved, on Chu-kuang Limited Express" (莒光特快附掛對號) and operated as a more affordable coach on the Chu-kuang Express services; however, the practice of having different classes of service on the same train was not well-received (TRA had abolished this system in 1953), and soon the Air Conditioned coaches were rebranded and operated as an independent class of trains and named the Fu-hsing Limited Express (復興特快).

Fu-Hsing Semi-Express trains were introduced in 1981. They were the first to be built in Taiwan, and the first Taiwanese trains to have air conditioning. The Fu-Hsing's final journey took place on 29 March 2022, and ran from Hualien to Shulin. Fu-Hsing trains were replaced by EMU500 and EMU900 series trains, and the Tze-chiang limited express. Fu-Hsing trains that could be refurbished were placed on the South-link line.
