= EMU600 series =

Passenger train in Taiwan

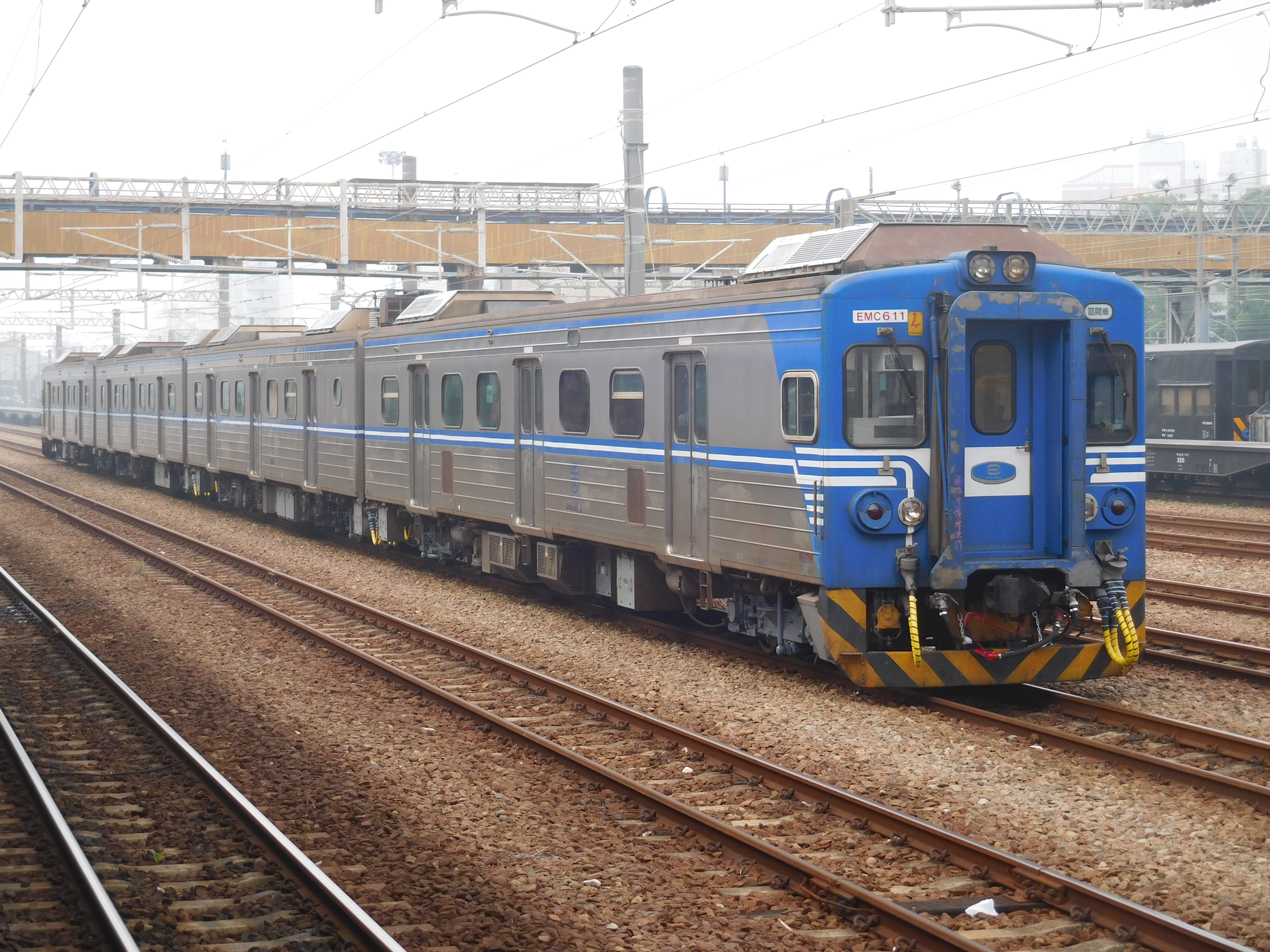
- EMU611 at Changhua in December 2017

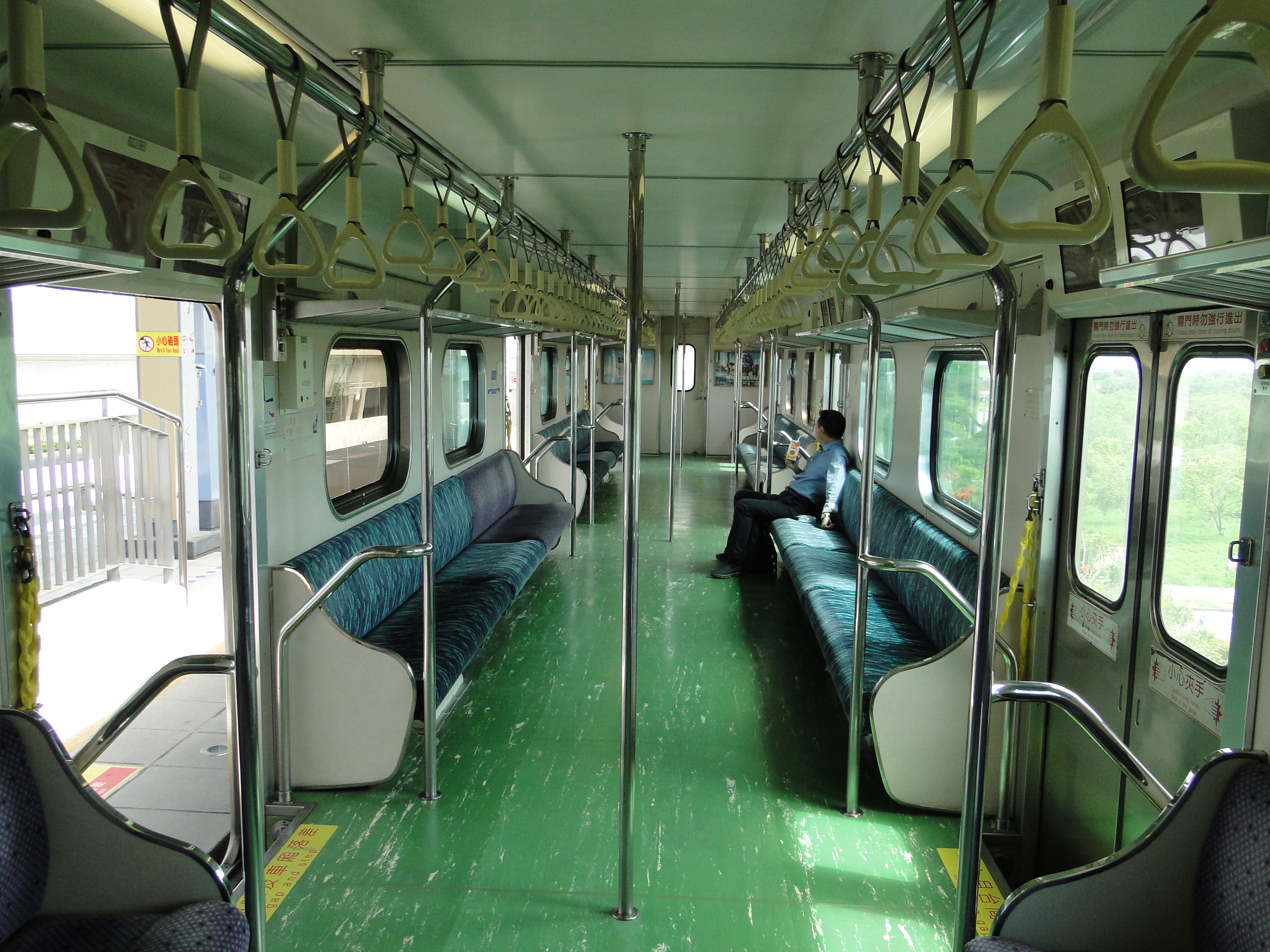
- Interior of an EMU600 train in April 2017
- In service: 2002–present
- Manufacturer: KOROS (now known as Hyundai Rotem)
- Assembly: KOROS (EMU601–EMU612); Tang Eng Iron Works (EMU613–EMU614)
- Constructed: 2001–2002
- Entered service: 11 October 2002
- Number built: 56 vehicles (14 sets)
- Number in service: 56 vehicles (14 sets) (as of 2015)
- Formation: 4 cars per trainset EMC-EP-ET-EM
- Fleet numbers: EMU601–EMU614
- Operator: Taiwan Railway Corporation

Specifications
- Car body construction: Stainless steel
- Car length: 20,300 mm (66 ft 7 3/16 in)
- Width: 2,853 mm (9 ft 4 5/16 in)
- Height: 4,234 mm (13 ft 10 11/16 in)
- Entry: Low floor
- Doors: 3 per side per car
- Weight: EMC: 39.75 t (39.12 long tons; 43.82 short tons); EP: 37.22 t (36.63 long tons; 41.03 short tons); ET: 35.26 t (34.70 long tons; 38.87 short tons); EM: 38.10 t (37.50 long tons; 42.00 short tons)
- Traction system: Toshiba COV050-A0 IGBT–VVVF
- Traction motors: 3-phase AC induction motor (KOROS)
- Power output: 1,920 kW (2,570 hp)
- Tractive effort: 194.2 kN
- Electric system: 25 kV 60 Hz AC (nominal) from overhead catenary
- Current collection: Pantograph
- Bogies: Alstom
- Braking system: Knorr-Bremse Kbr X1
- Multiple working: Within type With EMU500

The EMU600 series is a series of electric multiple unit passenger trains operated by Taiwan Railway Corporation. The trains are built as local trains and are used throughout the island’s rail network.

== History ==
With the electrification of the Yilan line and the North-link line in the early 2000s, the then Taiwan Railways Administration (TRA) faced a shortage of electric passenger trains. Therefore, in 1999, the TRA contracted South Korean manufacturer KOROS (now known as Hyundai Rotem) to build 56 cars, which could be divided into 14 trainsets. The first two trainsets were shipped to Taiwan on October 3, 2000. When KOROS renamed itself as Rotem in 2002, the new company continued to produce the trains. The last two trainsets (numbered 613 and 614) were produced in Taiwan by Tang Eng Iron Works. The trains entered service on 11 October 2002.

== Features ==
The EMU600 series runs in four-car units in the following order: a motorized car with the cab (EMC), an unmotorized car with a pantograph (EP), an unmotorized car (ET), and a motorized car (EM). On the outside, the EMU600 series shares many similarities with the EMU500 series, which was manufactured six years earlier. Both exteriors are made of stainless steel and have very similar liveries. However, unlike its predecessor, the traction system on the EMU600 series uses a insulated-gate bipolar transistor (IGBT) made by Toshiba instead of a gate turn-off thyristor (GTO) on the EMU500 series.

Similar to other local trains, the EMU600 series is fitted with cloth seats running parallel to the center aisle. In 2010, an LED display was installed above the doors. The cars originally had one step at each door; this was removed beginning in 2017 by raising platforms and remodeling the interior to turn the trains into a low floor layout for accessibility. As of November 2019, 70% of EMU600 trains have been reconfigured.

== See also ==
- EMU500 series
- EMU900 series
- Media related to TRA EMU600 at Wikimedia Commons
