= EMU500 series =

Passenger train in Taiwan

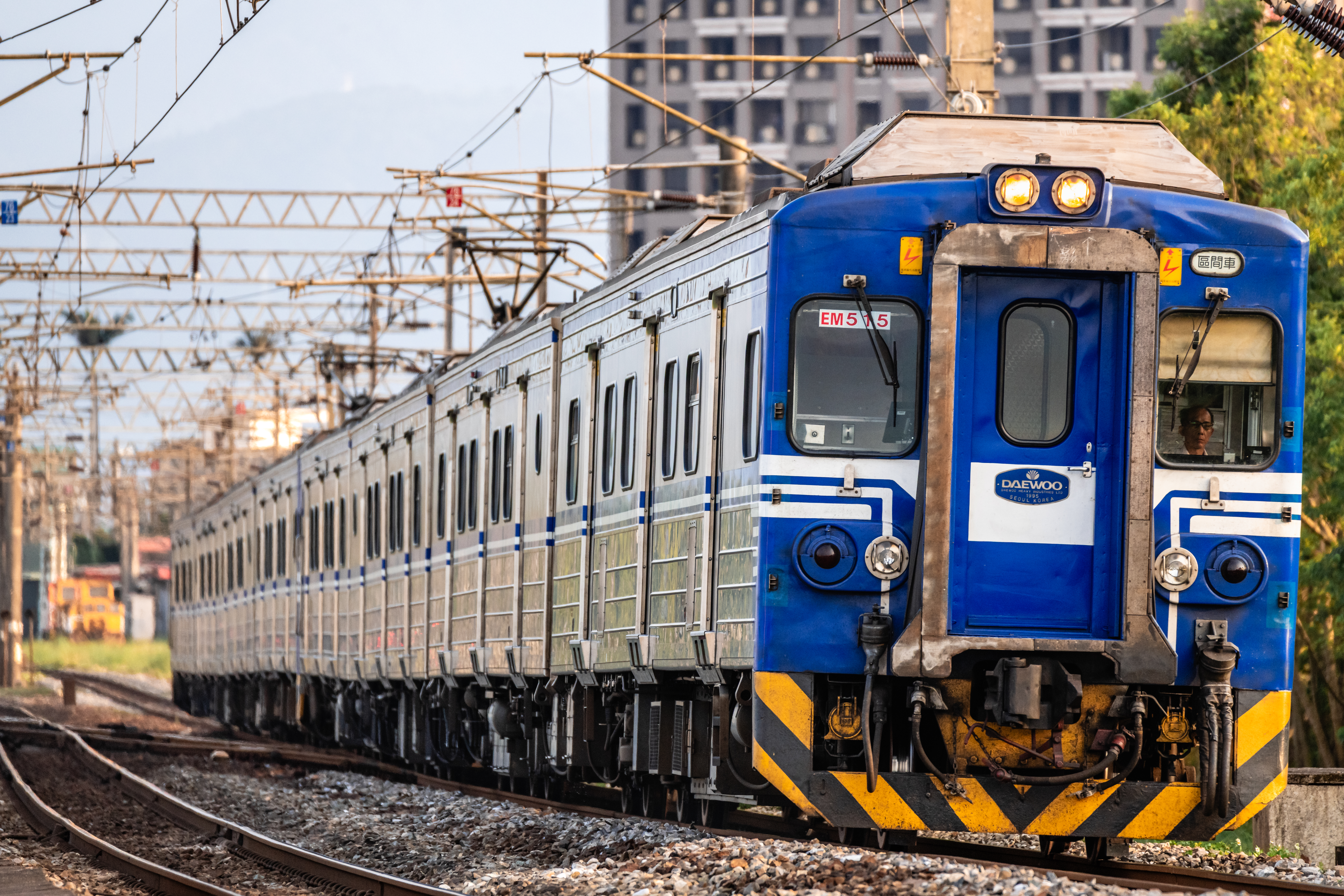
- EMU515 approaching Yilan in April 2020

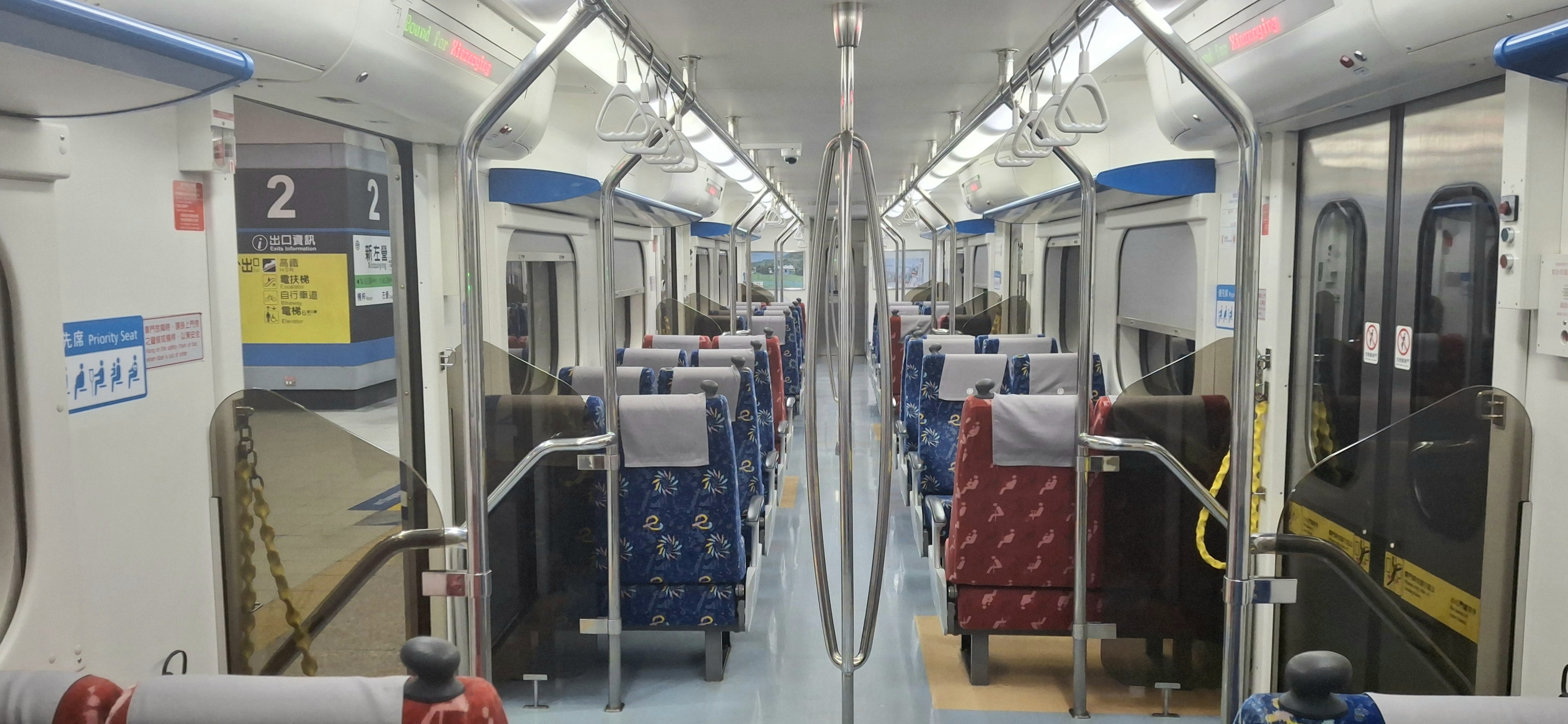
- Interior of a refurbished EMU500 train in August 2026
- In service: 1995–present
- Manufacturer: Daewoo Heavy Industries
- Constructed: 1995–1997
- Refurbished: 2018–2019 (EMU556–EMU570, full refurbishment with traction system upgrade); 2019–2023 (48 sets, traction system upgrade only)
- Number built: 344 vehicles (86 sets)
- Number in service: 336 vehicles (84 sets) (as of 2021)
- Number retired: 1 set (EMU536)
- Number scrapped: 1 set (EMU508)
- Formation: 4 cars per trainset
- Fleet numbers: EMU501–EMU586
- Operator: Taiwan Railway Corporation

Specifications
- Car body construction: Stainless steel
- Car length: 20,330 mm (66 ft 8 in)
- Width: 2,853 mm (9 ft 4.3 in)
- Height: 4,219 mm (13 ft 10.1 in)
- Entry: Low floor
- Doors: 3 per side per car
- Traction system: Original: Siemens E1700 D900/750 M5 rpd-1 GTO–VVVF; Refurbished: Mitsubishi MAP-254-A25V329 IGBT–VVVF
- Traction motors: 3-phase AC induction motor (Siemens)
- Power output: 2,000 kW (2,700 hp)
- Tractive effort: 210 kN
- Electric system: 25 kV 60 Hz Overhead
- Bogies: ABB
- Braking system: Knorr-Bremse Kbr X1
- Multiple working: Within type With EMU600

The EMU500 series is a series of electric multiple unit passenger trains operated by Taiwan Railway Corporation. The trains are built as local trains and are used throughout the country's rail network.

== History ==
In the 1990s, the then Taiwan Railways Administration (TRA) was facing an aging fleet of local trains, all of which did not feature air conditioning. Therefore, in 1993, the company entered a contract with South Korean manufacturer Daewoo Heavy Industries to build 344 cars, which would be arranged all into 86 trainsets. The first of these trains arrived in the summer of 1995, and the first passenger service began in 11 October of the same year.

== Features ==
The train is built on a system developed by Siemens, which features three-phase induction motors and a 16-bit control system. Trains are usually operated in four-car units in the following order: a motorized car with the cab (EMC), an unmotorized car with a pantograph (EP), an unmotorized car (ET), and a motorized car (EM). The braking system is supplied by Knorr-Bremse.

The exterior of the train is made of stainless steel, the first in Taiwan to use the material. Its appearance is based on the design of the DR2900 series. Each car features three doors on each side, an improvement from the EMU400 series' two doors. The destination signs have black text over a white background, which is inverted from the EMU400 series; this was updated to an LED display in 2004–2005.

Similar to other local trains, seats run parallel to the walls of the train. The cars originally had one step at each door; this was removed between 2016 and 2019 by raising platforms and remodeling the interior to convert the trains into a low floor layout for accessibility. With this change, the doorframe was raised slightly, and an LED display was installed above the doors. As of August 2019, 246 out of 334 cars are low floor. As of 2020, the traction system is also being upgraded.

== Incidents ==
On 15 June 2007, a southbound EMU500 series train number 2719 was changing tracks south of Dali station when it was hit by a northbound E400 series that was undergoing testing. The E400 hit the second car of the four-car unit, killing 5 and injuring 17. The TRA determined that the crash was caused by a faulty ATP system in the E400, as well as speeding by the train driver causing him to misread the signs.

On 8 July 2016, a bomb was detonated within a northbound EMU550 train number 1258 near Songshan station, injuring 25 people. The perpetrator, who was also injured, was arrested and sentenced to 30 years in prison.

On 27 April 2020, A EMU500 series train collided with another EMU500 series train near Hualien station, injuring 7 TRA employees.

== See also ==
- EMU600 series
- Media related to TRA EMU500 at Wikimedia Commons
