= EMU900 series =

Passenger train in Taiwan

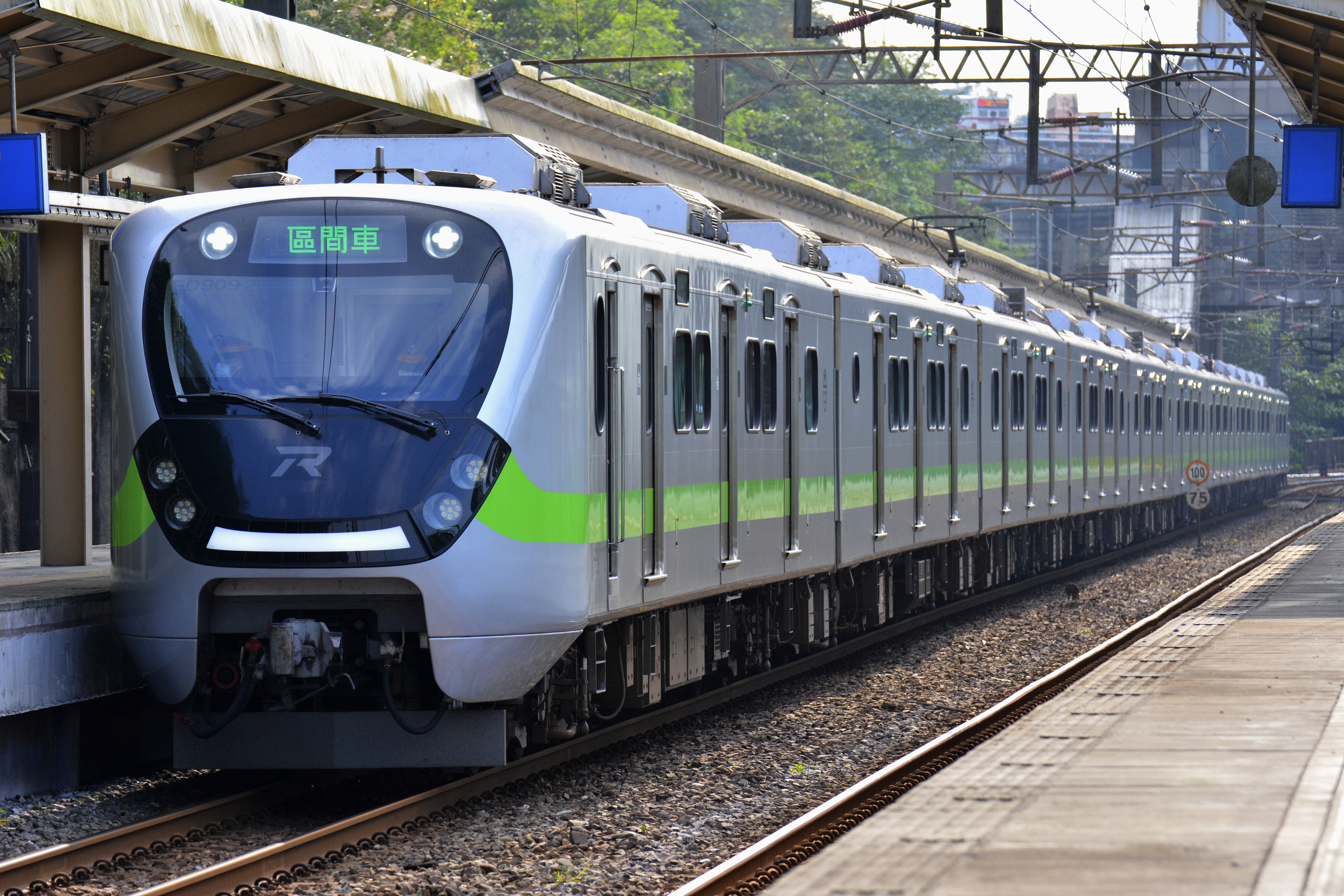
- EMU909 at Baifu in March 2022

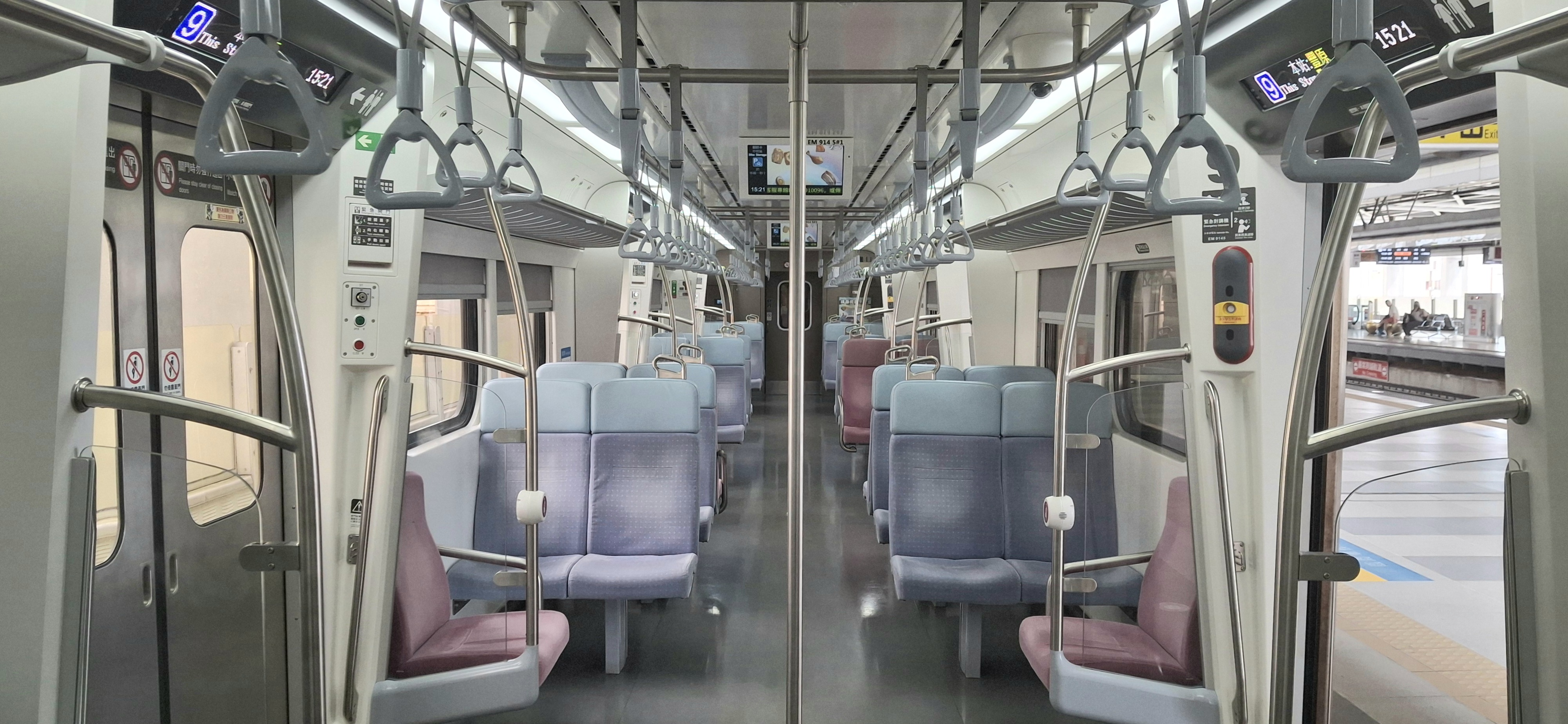
- Interior of an EMU900 train
- In service: 2021–present
- Manufacturer: Hyundai Rotem
- Designer: MBD Technologies
- Built at: Changwon, South Korea
- Constructed: 2020–2023
- Entered service: 6 April 2021
- Number built: 520 vehicles (52 sets)
- Number in service: 520 vehicles (52 sets)
- Formation: 10 cars per trainset
- Fleet numbers: EMU901–EMU952
- Operator: Taiwan Railway Corporation

Specifications
- Car body construction: Stainless steel
- Train length: 205.56 m (674 ft 4 15/16 in)
- Car length: 21.58 m (70 ft 9 5/8 in) (ED); 20.3 m (66 ft 7 3/16 in) (EM/EP)
- Width: 2.89 m (9 ft 5 3/4 in)
- Height: 3.99 m (13 ft 1 1/16 in) (ED/EM); 4,282 mm (14 ft 9/16 in) (EP)
- Wheelbase: 2.3 m (7 ft 7 in)
- Maximum speed: 140 km/h (87 mph) (design); 130 km/h (81 mph) (service)
- Traction system: Toshiba COV098-B0 IGBT–C/I
- Traction motors: 20 × Toshiba SEA-449 220 kW (300 hp) asynchronous 3-phase AC
- Power output: 4.4 MW (5,900 hp)
- Gear ratio: 6.105 : 1
- Acceleration: 0.7 m/s^{2} (2.3 ft/s^{2}) (0–50 km/h (0–31 mph)); 0.4 m/s^{2} (1.3 ft/s^{2}) (50–110 km/h (31–68 mph)); 0.2 m/s^{2} (0.66 ft/s^{2}) (110–130 km/h (68–81 mph))
- Electric system: 25 kV 60 Hz AC (nominal) from overhead catenary
- Current collection: Pantograph
- UIC classification: 2′2′+Bo′Bo′+2′2′+Bo′Bo′+Bo′Bo′+2′2′+Bo′Bo′+2′2′+Bo′Bo′+2′2′
- Bogies: RE2320B
- Coupling system: Tightlock/Janney
- Track gauge: 1,067 mm (3 ft 6 in)

The EMU900 series is a series of electric multiple unit passenger trains operated by Taiwan Railway Corporation. Manufactured in South Korea by Hyundai Rotem, the trains are used on Local and Fast Local services, which stop at most stations. They entered service on 6 April 2021.

== History ==
The EMU900 series were purchased by the then Taiwan Railways Administration as part of an effort to replace its aging rolling stock, specifically the Chu-Kuang and Fu-Hsing services, and to increase the carrying capacity of the system. In 2017, the Ministry of Transportation and Communications approved an approximately NT$100 billion plan to replace 990 rail vehicles, or 39.15% of all vehicles, by 2024. The plan included 520 electric commuter railcars, 600 intercity railcars (EMU3000 series), 107 diesel locomotives, and 60 electro-diesel railcars. As the only bidder, South Korea's Hyundai Rotem was contracted for building the commuter railcars for NT$25.7 billion. This marks the first contract given to Hyundai Rotem since 1999.

The trains were built in Hyundai Rotem's Changwon plant. The first two trainsets were delivered to the Port of Hualien on 24 October 2020, and began special passenger services between Shulin and Keelung from 1 April 2021, between Shulin and Hualien on 5–6 April as an additional service during the Qingming Festival, and eventually on 6 April as an ordinary local train between Keelung and Miaoli. Hyundai Rotem plans on delivering all trainsets by 2023.

== Design ==
The exterior of the train is designed by MBD Technologies, a French company involved with the design of the TGV. The design is based around the concept of "a smiling welcome". Each train is composed of ten cars, which is longer than its predecessors. According to the TRA, the EMU900 series is equipped with train control and management system (TCMS), which provide centralized controls for the doors, air conditioning, and fire safety equipment aboard the train. Additionally, the train's lighting can adjust automatically based on the exterior brightness to conserve electricity. The train's interior features twelve bicycle racks, priority seats for pregnant women, eight wheelchair spaces, and three restrooms.

== Controversies ==
On 1 June 2021, EMU901 was temporarily withdrawn from service due to abnormal signaling within its power system. In November 2021 the EMU900 series attracted controversy due to water leakage from the air conditioning units, which is a very common problem in this set up with roof mounted AC units. Investigations revealed that the air conditioning units were supplied by a German firm with factories in China, acting as subcontractor to the car builder, which was technically against contract terms as China is not a signatory to the WTO GPA (Government Procurement Agreement).

== Formations ==
	EMU900 ←Pingtung, Kaohsiung Keelung, Hualien→									
Car position	1	2	3	4	5	6	7	8	9	10
Pantograph			>			<		<		
Car type	50ED9xx 1 (Tc)	45EM9xx 1 (M)	45EP9xx 1 (T)	50EM9xx 2 (M)	45EM9xx 3 (M)	45EP9xx 2 (T)	50EM9xx 4 (M)	45EP9xx 3 (T)	45EM9xx 5 (M)	50ED9xx 2 (Tc)
Electrical equipment	SIV	VVVF, Rc	Mtr, VCB, CP, ACP	VVVF, Rc, SIV	VVVF, Rc	Mtr, VCB, ACP	VVVF, Rc, SIV	Mtr, VCB, CP, ACP	VVVF, Rc	SIV
Other features										
Weight (t)	50	45	45	50	45	45	50	45	45	50
Seating capacity	30	44	54	56	48	20 (8 wheelchair spaces)	56	54	44	30
Numbering	50ED901 1 : 50ED952 1	45EM901 1 : 45EM952 1	45EP901 1 : 45EP952 1	50EM901 2 : 50EM952 2	45EM901 3 : 45EM952 3	45EP901 2 : 45EP952 2	50EM901 4 : 50EM952 4	45EP901 3 : 45EP952 3	45EM901 5 : 45EM952 5	50ED901 2 : 50ED952 2

Key:

- VVVF: Motor
- Rc: Rectifier
- Mtr: Transformer
- VCB: Vacuum circuit breaker
- SIV: Static inverter
- CP: Air compressor (main pump)
- ACP: Auxiliary air compressor (assisted pump)
- : Control cab (1st and 10th cars), crew room (5th car)
- : Toilet
- : Disabled facilities (wheelchair space and disabled toilet)
- : Bike rack

=== Exterior ===
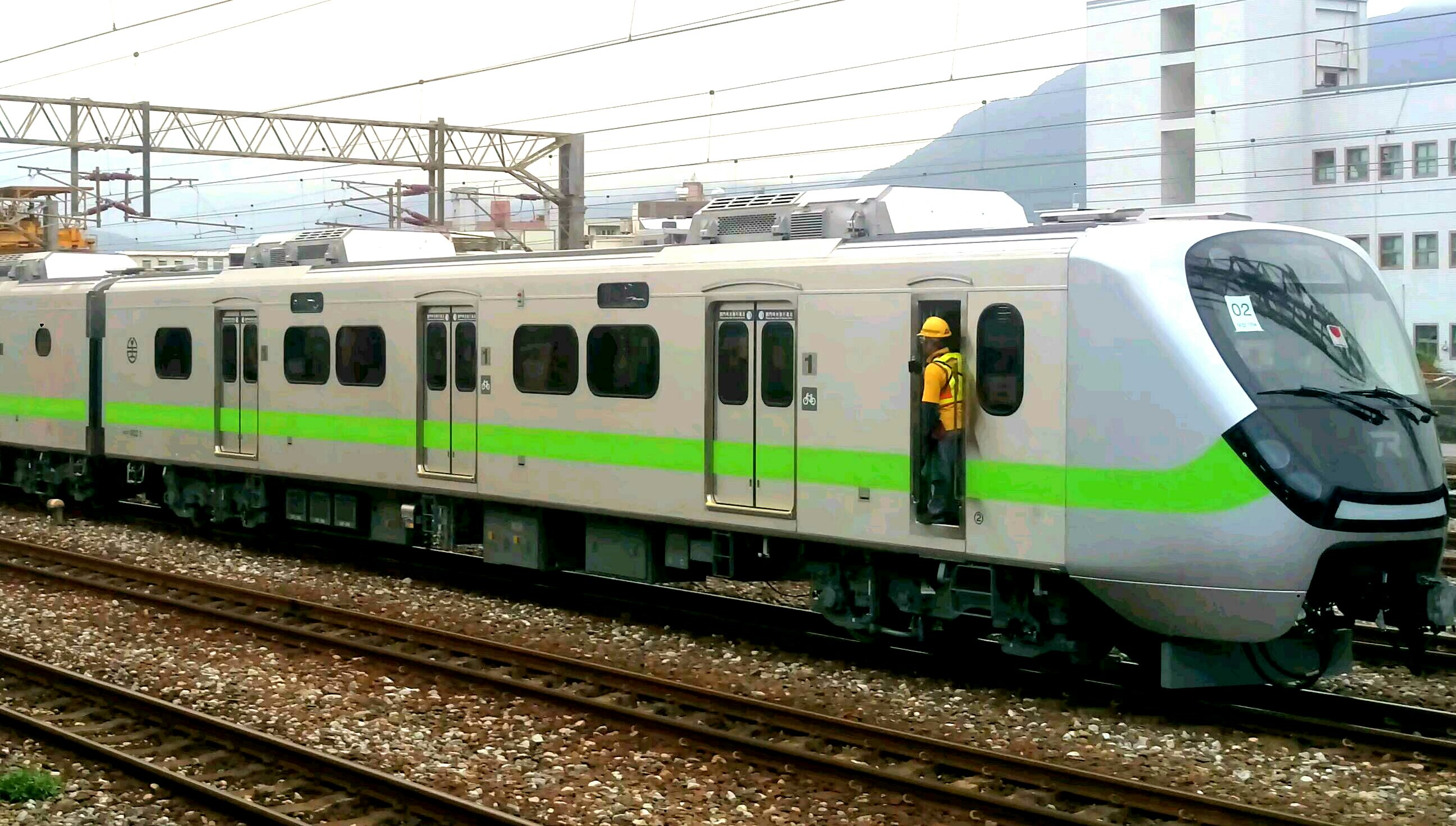
50ED900 1 (1st car)

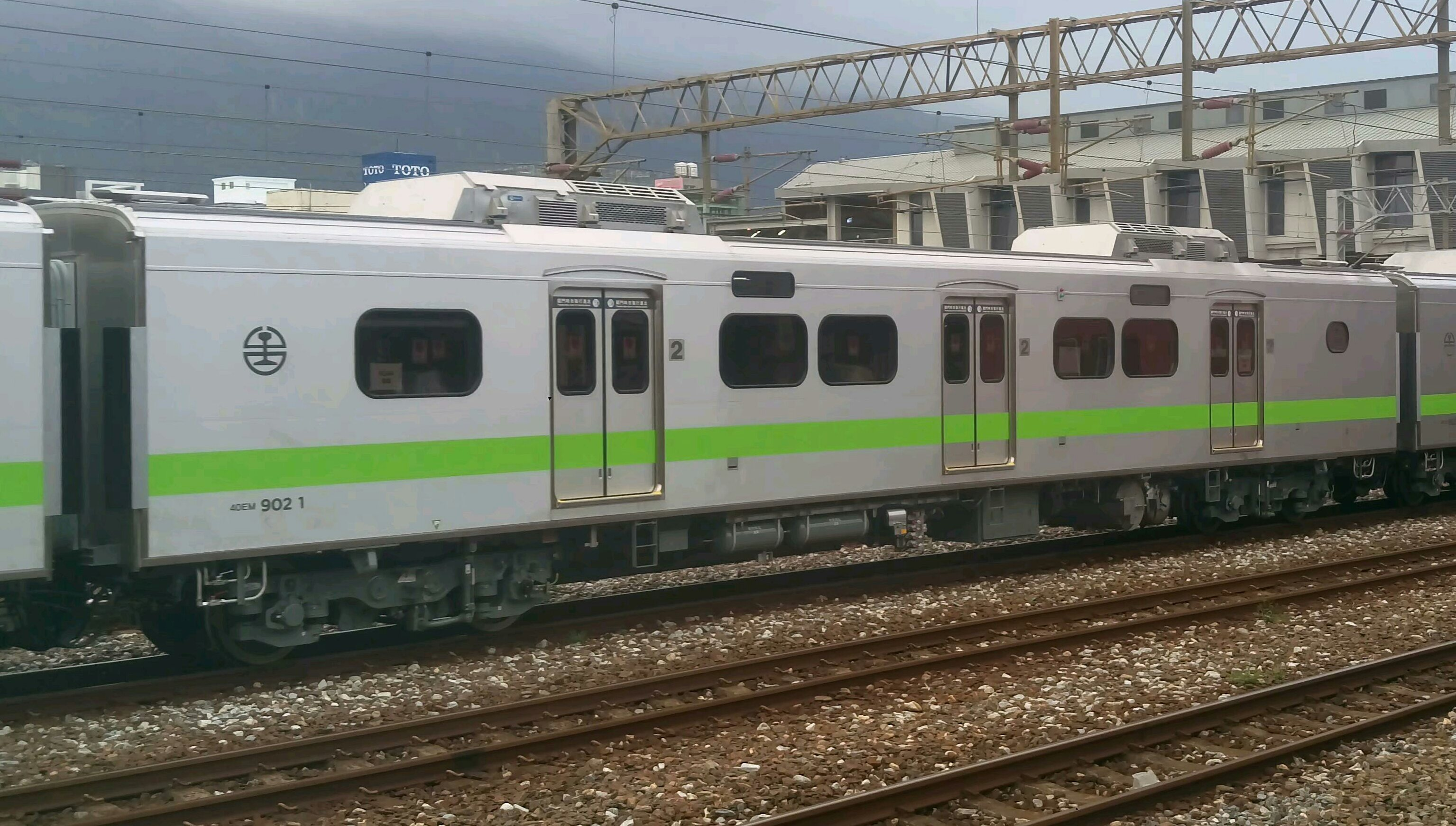
45EM900 1 (2nd car)

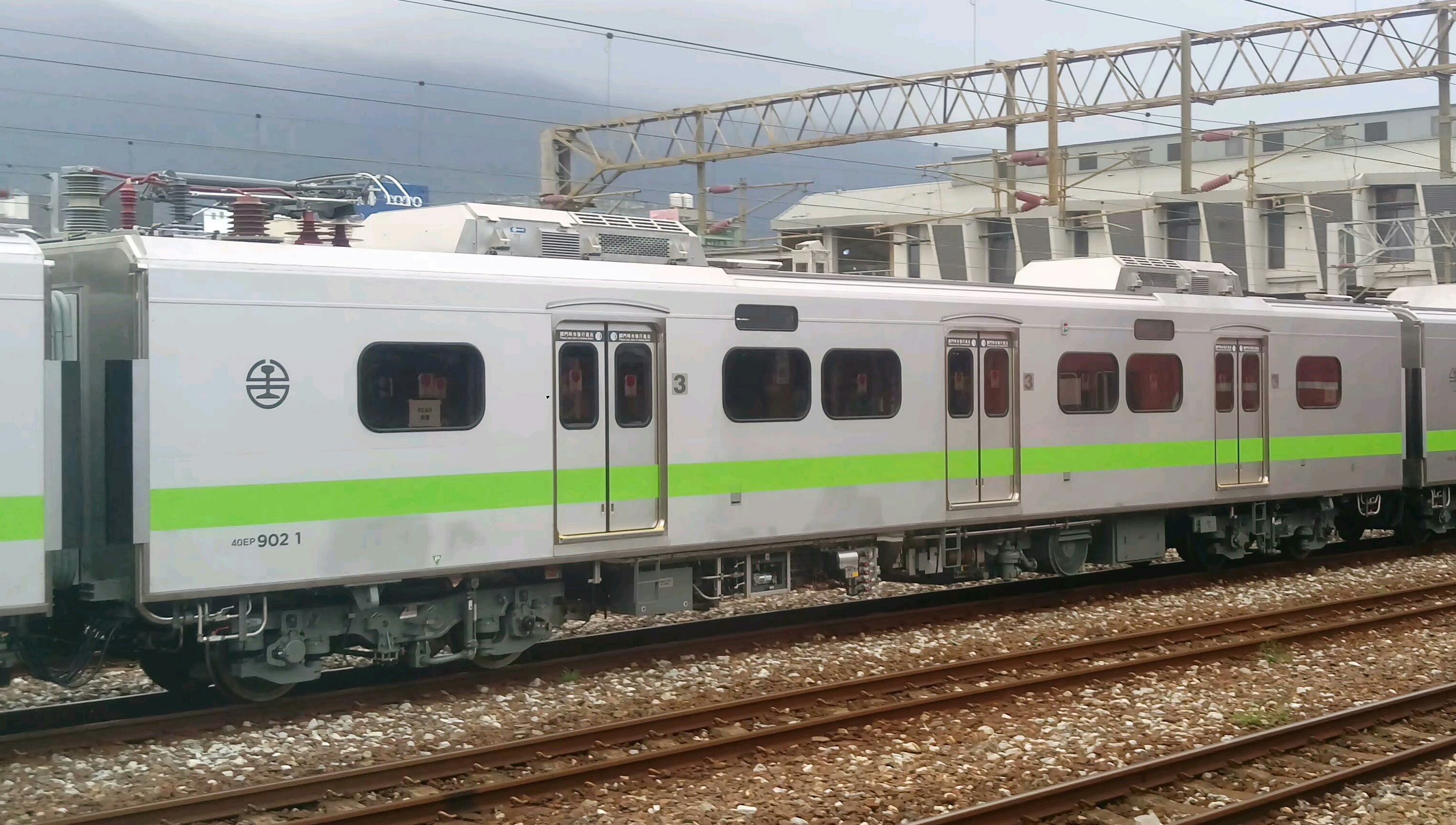
45EP900 1 (3rd car)

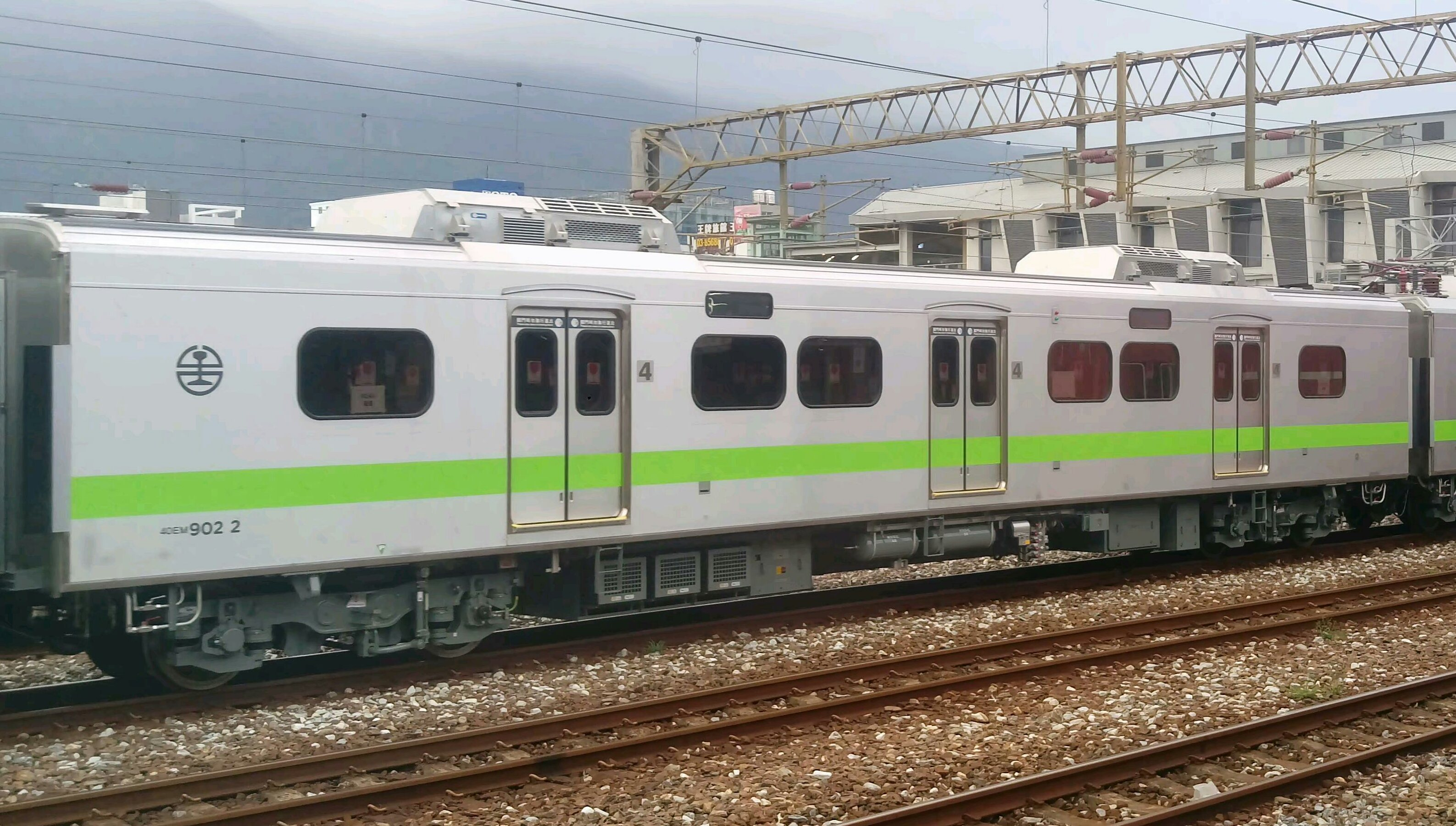
50EM900 2 (4th car)

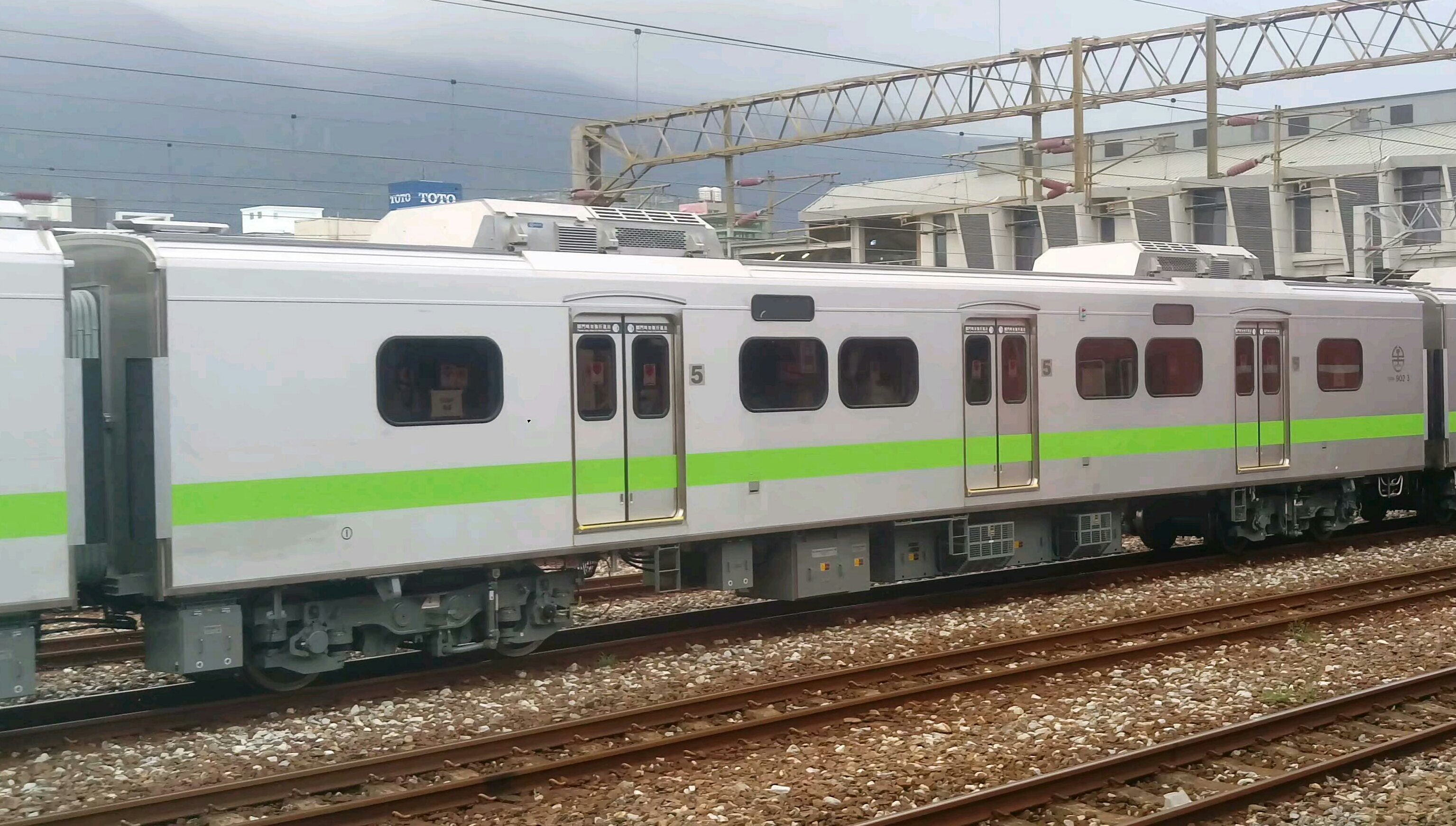
45EM900 3 (5th car)

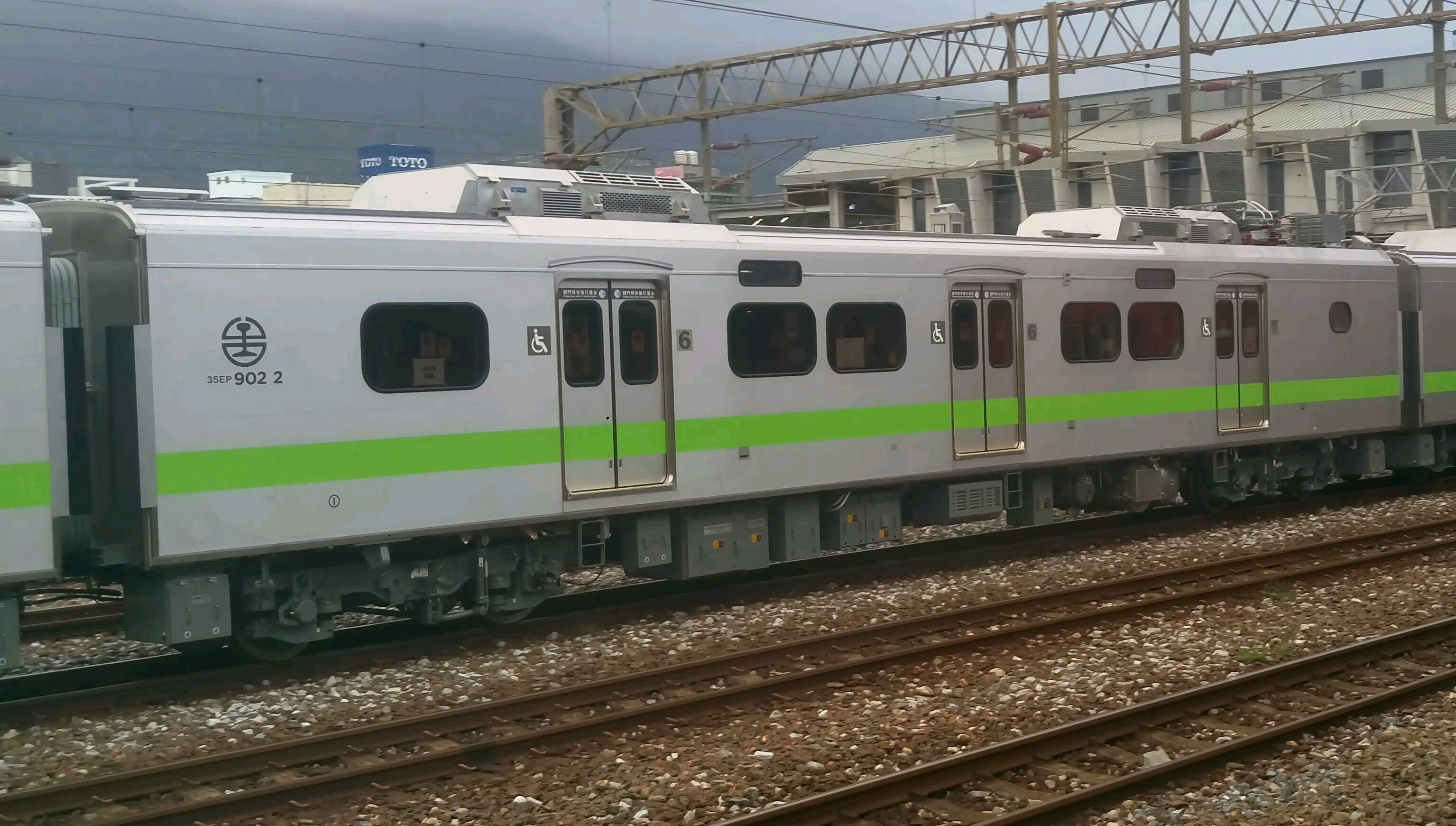
45EP900 2 (6th car)

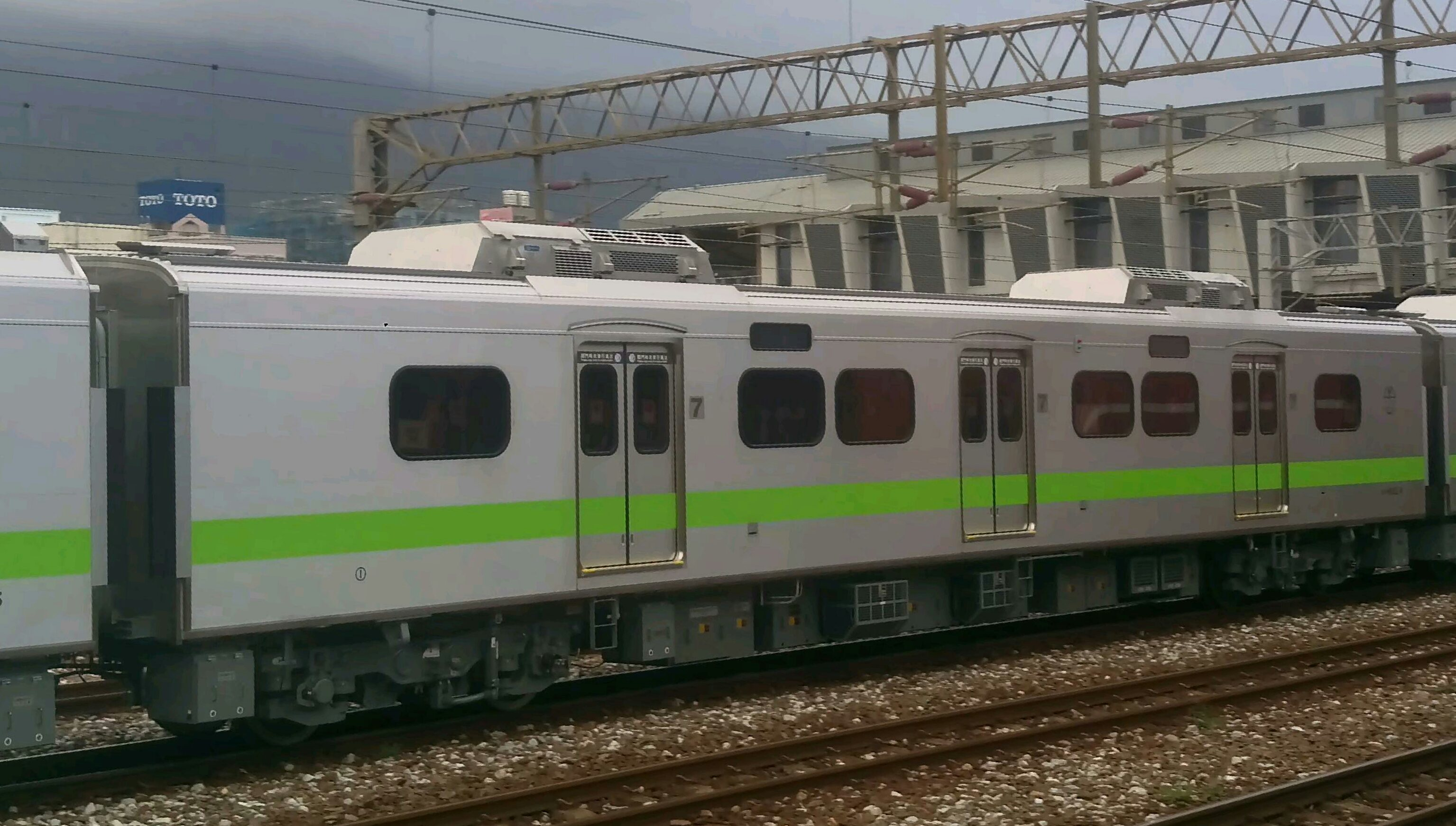
50EM900 4 (7th car)

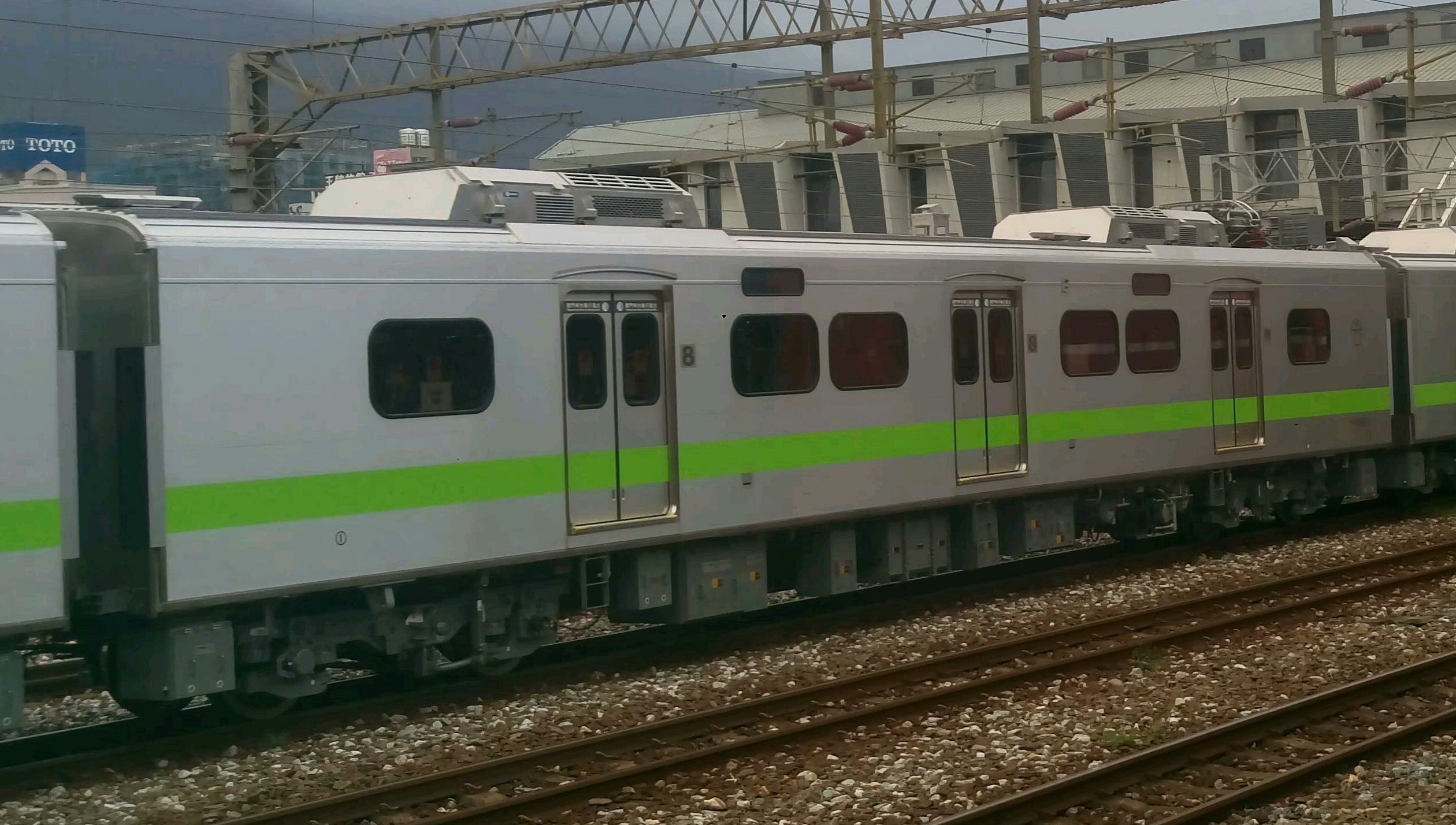
45EP900 3 (8th car)

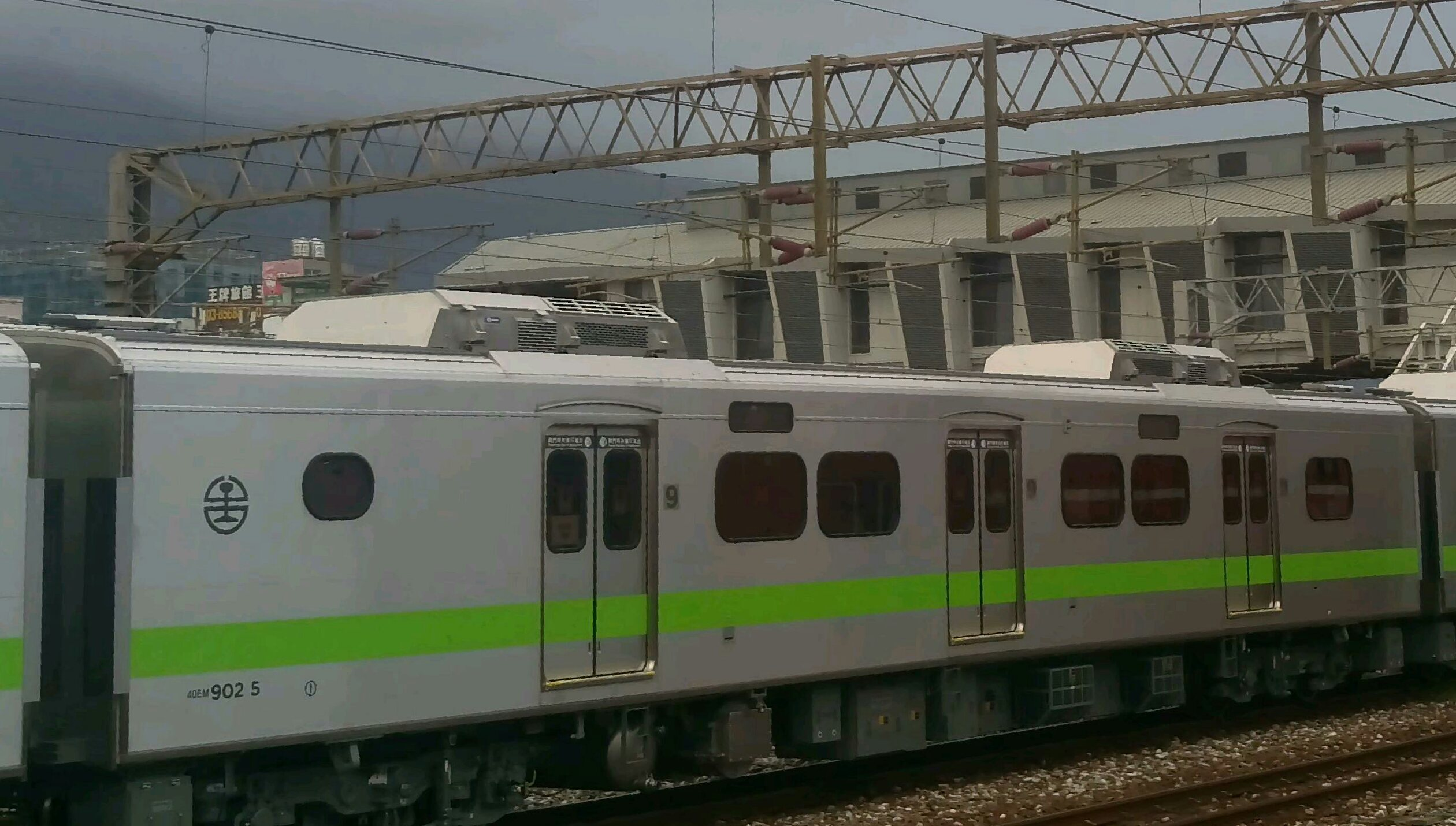
45EM900 5 (9th car)

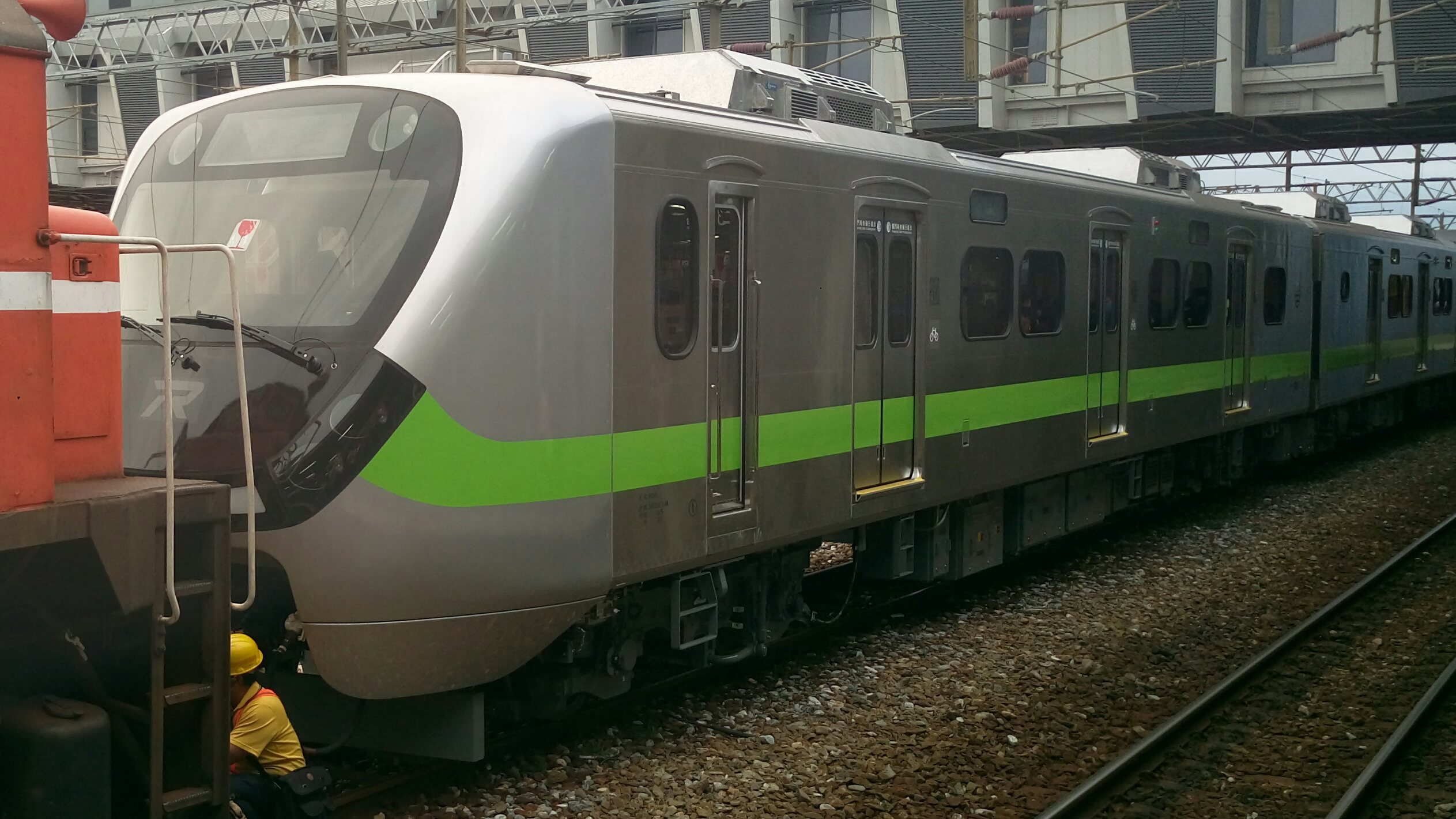
50ED900 2 (10th car)

== See also ==
- EMU600 series
- Media related to TRA EMU900 at Wikimedia Commons
