= Department of Railways New South Wales =

Rail transport agency in NSW, 1932–1972

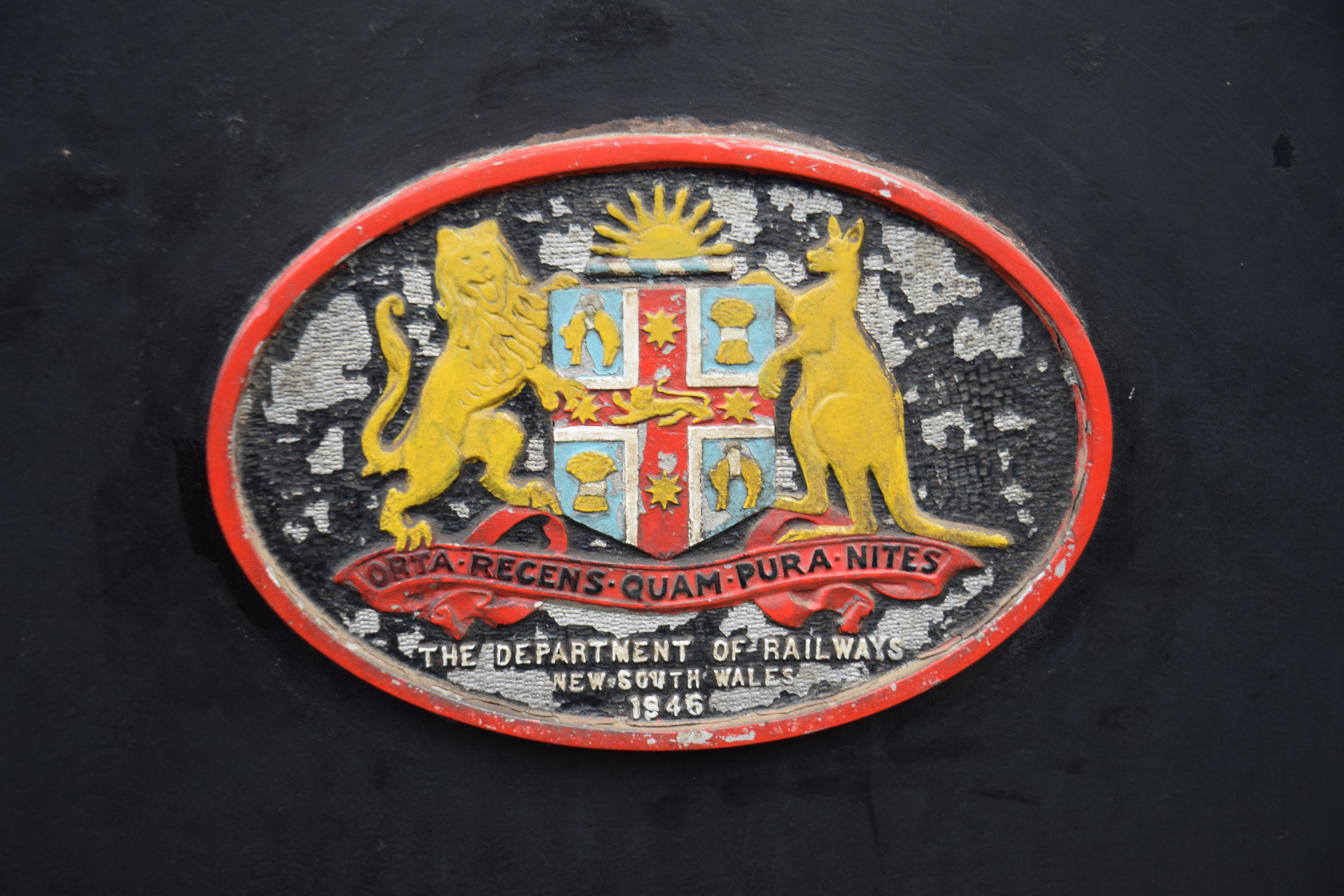
- The Agency Logo on NSWR H Young Class C38 4-6-2 No.3820 at the NSW Railway Museum, Thirlmere in 2016

Commission overview
- Formed: 29 December 1932
- Preceding Commission: New South Wales Government Railways
- Dissolved: 19 October 1972
- Superseding Commission: Public Transport Commission
- Jurisdiction: New South Wales
- Headquarters: Sydney
- Minister responsible: Michael Bruxner, Minister for Transport
- Commission executive: Commissioner for Railways

The Department of Railways New South Wales was the agency of the Government of New South Wales that administered rail transport in New South Wales, Australia between 1932 and 1972.

== Management ==
The Department of Railways was under the control of a single Commissioner for Railways who answered to the Minister for Railways (later Minister for Transport) and replacing the functions of the Chief Transport Commissioner. The first Commissioner was Thomas Joseph Hartigan, who held the position until his retirement in 1948.

=== Commissioner for Railways ===
#	Commissioner	Term	Time in office	Notes
1	Thomas Joseph Hartigan CMG	29 December 1932 – 30 September 1948	15 years, 276 days	
2	Frederick Charles Garside	1 October 1948 – 4 February 1952	3 years, 126 days	
3	Keith Aird Fraser	5 February 1952 – 23 August 1952	200 days	
4	Reginald Winsor	1 September 1952 – 31 July 1956	3 years, 334 days	
5	Neal McCusker CBE	1 August 1956 – 19 October 1972	16 years, 79 days	
Succeeded by Chief Commissioner of the Public Transport Commission.

== Rail agency history in New South Wales ==
The Department of Railways New South Wales was preceded by the New South Wales Government Railways, this organisation was replaced by the Department of Railways New South Wales after the 1932 amendment of the Railways Act by the Transport (Division of Factions) Act.

The Department of Railways New South Wales was replaced in 1972 by the Public Transport Commission on 20 October 1972 which was formed following the enactment of the Public Transport Commission Act, 1972 (NSW).

== Publication ==
The department published an in-house journal, The Railwayman, from September 1958 until October 1972.

== See also ==
Rail transport in New South Wales
