= New South Wales U set =

Retired class of electric multiple unit operated in New South Wales, Australia

U set
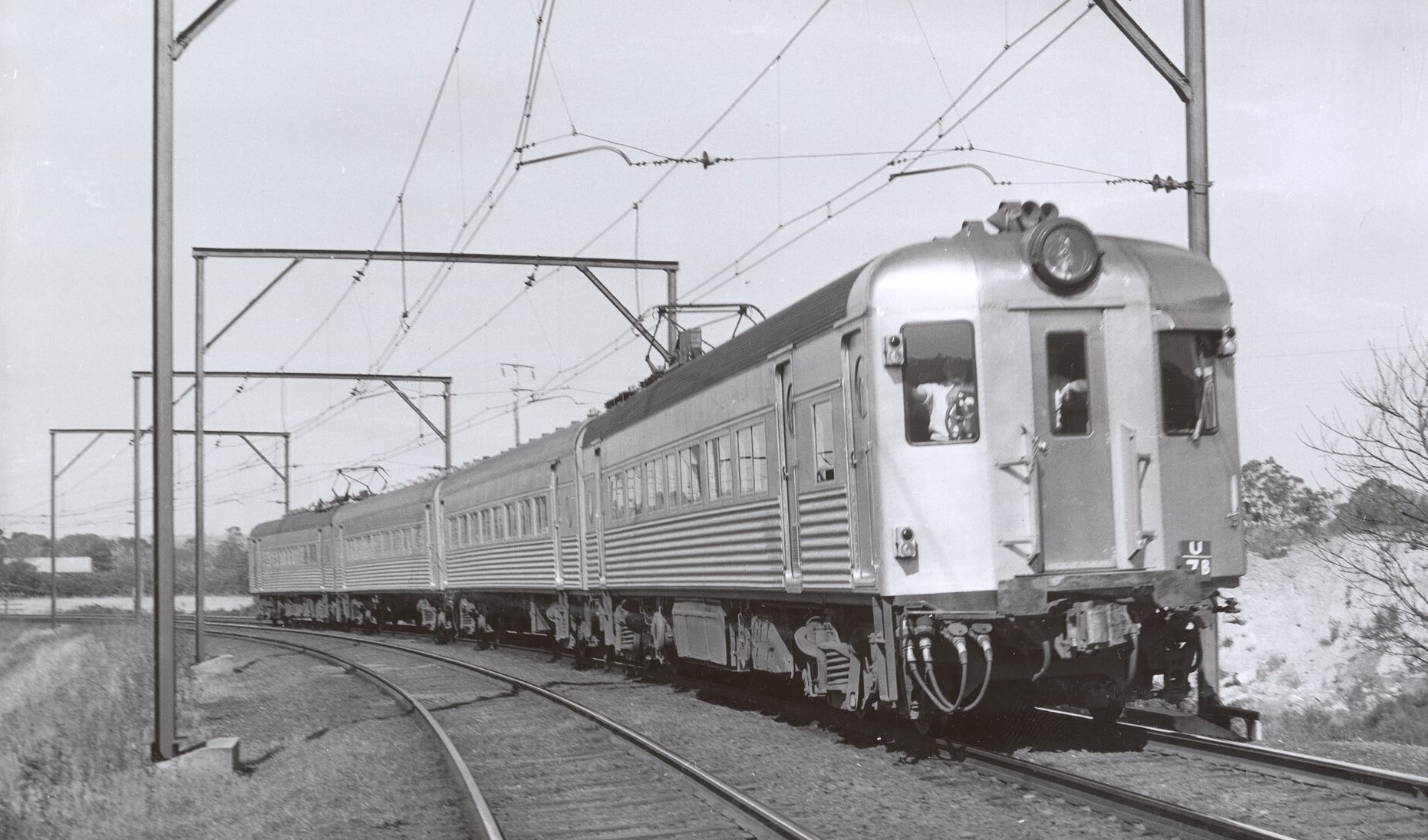
- Set U2 at an unknown date

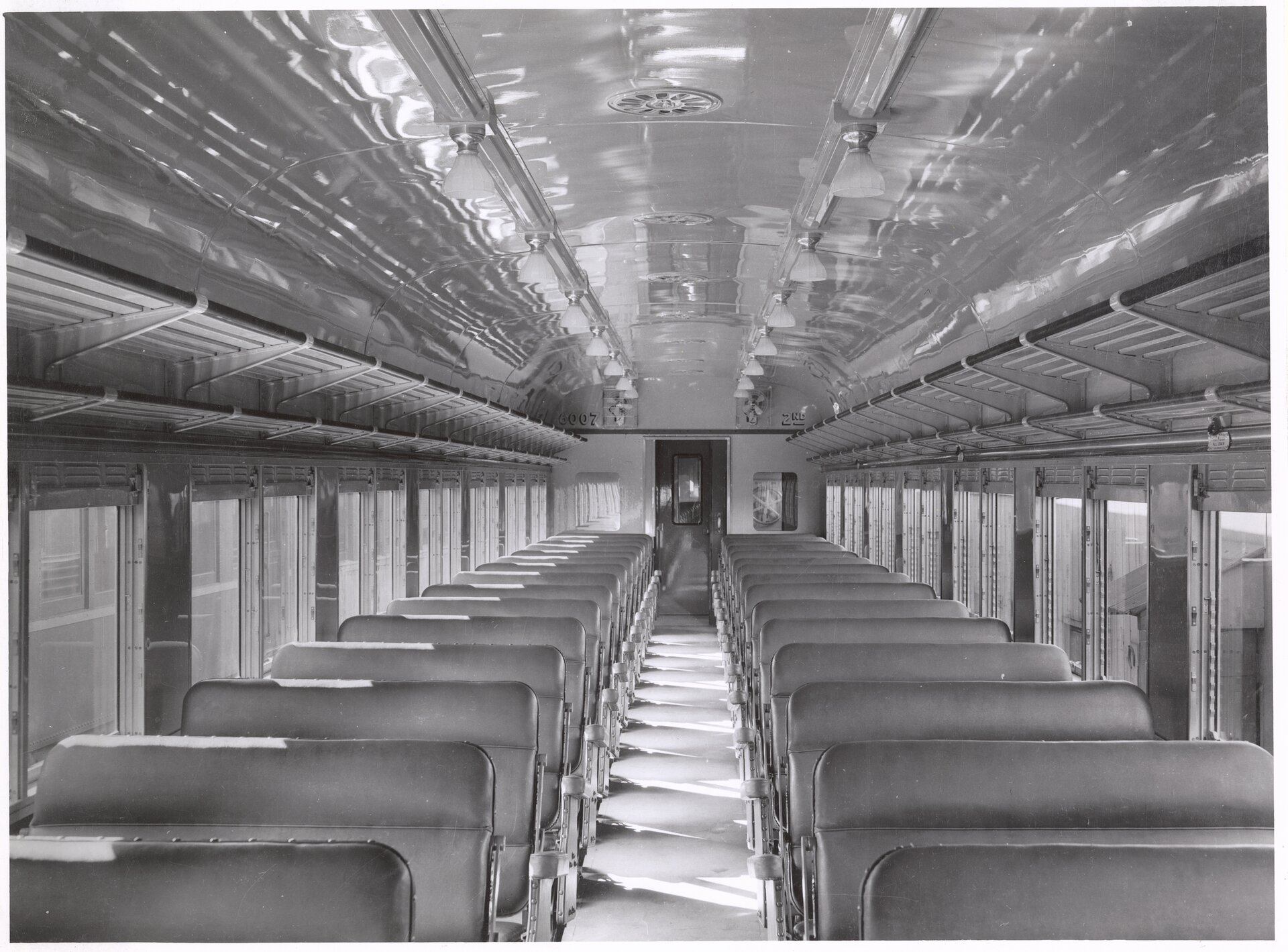
- Interior of trailer car TF6007
- Stock type: Electric Multiple Unit
- In service: 15 September 1958 – 29 October 1996
- Manufacturer: Commonwealth Engineering
- Built at: Granville
- Constructed: 1957–1960
- Entered service: September 1958 – March 1960
- Number built: 40 motor cars; 20 trailer cars; 20 non-smoking trailer cars
- Number preserved: 60 carriages (as of 2017)
- Number scrapped: 20 carriages
- Successor: G set V set
- Formation: 4 car sets (6, 8 and 10 Car sets in peak hours)
- Fleet numbers: CF 5001–40; TF 6001–20; ETB 6021–40
- Operators: New South Wales Government Railways; Public Transport Commission; State Rail Authority; CityRail
- Depot: Flemington Maintenance Depot
- Lines served: Blue Mountains; Newcastle; Illawarra

Specifications
- Car length: 20.57 m (67 ft 5 7/8 in)
- Width: 2,950 mm (9 ft 8 1/8 in)
- Height: 3,920 mm (12 ft 10 3/8 in)
- Doors: 2 manual swinging doors on each side at each end of the carriage
- Maximum speed: 70 mph (113 km/h)
- Weight: 49 long tons 8 cwt (110,700 lb or 50.2 t)
- Traction system: 4 Metropolitan-Vickers MV222 series-wound DC traction motors per motor coach, each rated at 180 hp, semi-automatic electro-pneumatic resistance control.
- Transmission: 74:17 Gear ratio. Helical gears. Wheel diameter 36 inch (914mm)
- Power supply: 120vDC
- Electric system: 1,500 V DC catenary
- Current collection: Single-pan diamond pantograph
- Braking systems: Westinghouse Brake & Signal Co electro-pneumatic and automatic air brakes, brake blocks active on all wheels
- Coupling system: automatic coupling
- Multiple working: MU capable in various formations
- Track gauge: 1,435 mm (4 ft 8 1/2 in) standard gauge

The U sets are a class of electric multiple unit (EMU) that were operated by the New South Wales Government Railways and its successors between September 1958 and November 1996. They were colloquially nicknamed "U boats" after the German submarine of the same name.

== Development and delivery ==
The New South Wales Government Railways began planning the electrification of the Main Western line over the Blue Mountains from 1949, and with that plan in full swing by the early 1950s, called tenders for 80 cars (40 motor, 20 trailer and 20 first with buffet trailer), with the contract being awarded to Commonwealth Engineering, Granville, in 1954. The cars were fitted with two lavatorial facilities and an Ice box that dispensed Iced water.

Electric traction equipment was supplied by the Metropolitan-Vickers, Manchester and were the final electric trains in New South Wales to have their tractive power supplied from them before they liquidated in 1960.

However, before construction began the order was amended with the twenty planned first with buffet cars built as full first class seating cars, after a review of the New South Wales Government Railways conducted by American firm Ebasco Services Incorporated in the mid-1950s who recommended the change.

Had the change not been approved, these cars were going to be numbered RT6601–RT6620. These carriages would instead become first class carriages, which were given a doorway in the saloon to create both smoking and non-smoking compartment inside the carriages.

The U sets were a bit different compared to the suburban single decked trains that were delivered at the same time. They were the first EMUs in NSW to feature stainless-steel construction using technology from the Budd Company, improving train acceleration and giving the trains lower maintenance costs and a longer usable life. Additionally, they were slightly thinner than their suburban counterparts and were fitted with single reflective headlights. The U sets started to be delivered from June 1957.

The cars were numbered as:

Total	Type	Numbers	Notes
40	2nd class motor cars	CF5001–CF5040	
20	1st class trailer cars	ETB6021–ETB6040	Became normal trailers in 1974
20	2nd class trailer cars	TF6001–TF6020	

== In service ==
The first U set service with "The Fish" headboard in 1958

The first appearance took place on 22 June 1957 when cars TF6006-TF6009 were hauled by electric locomotive 4612 as part of the first official electric train to travel on the newly electrified Blue Mountains line. Normal services began on 15 September 1958 with set U1 (CF5007, TF6008, ETB6021, TF6016, CF5008, CF5005, ETB6022, TF6009 and CF5006), and all were in service by March 1960.

The U sets initially entered revenue service on 15 September 1958 this being a Sydney Terminal to Mount Victoria service which was then known as "The Fish" which first served as a nine car set but eventually was increased to ten cars for future services. Most services were made up of 4 car sets but some were 6–8 cars set during peak hours.

In 1961, a U set trailer was borrowed for the Canberra Monaro Express and Goulburn Day Train that was taken by two 1100 class railcars and was sandwiched in-between the two diesel railcar carriages. This was due to the urgency of needing new carriages for the service that they were taking and at the time only had two motor cars. This U set car would be put back into regular service with its counterparts when the 1100 trailer was built.

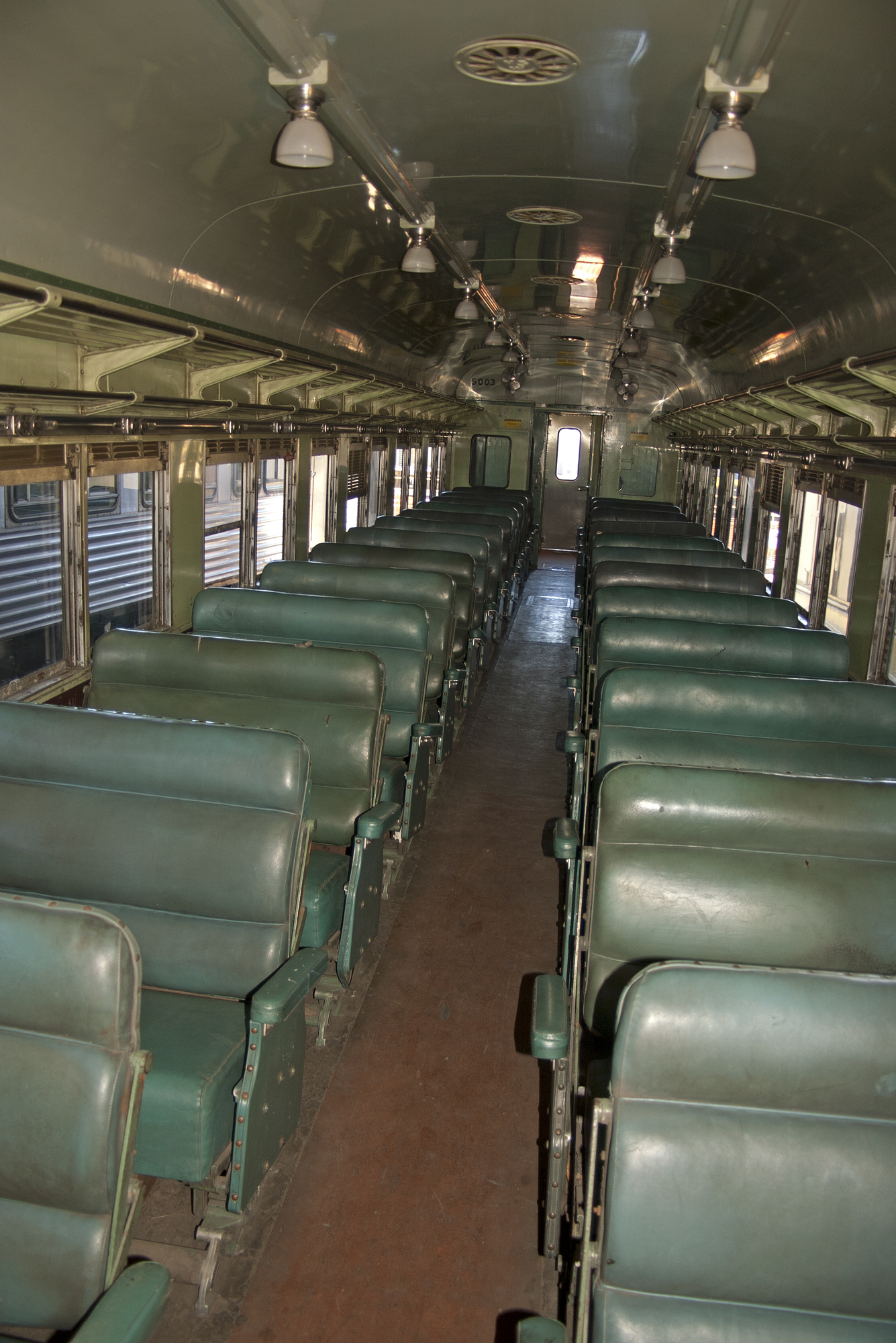
CF5003 with the original brown and green interior

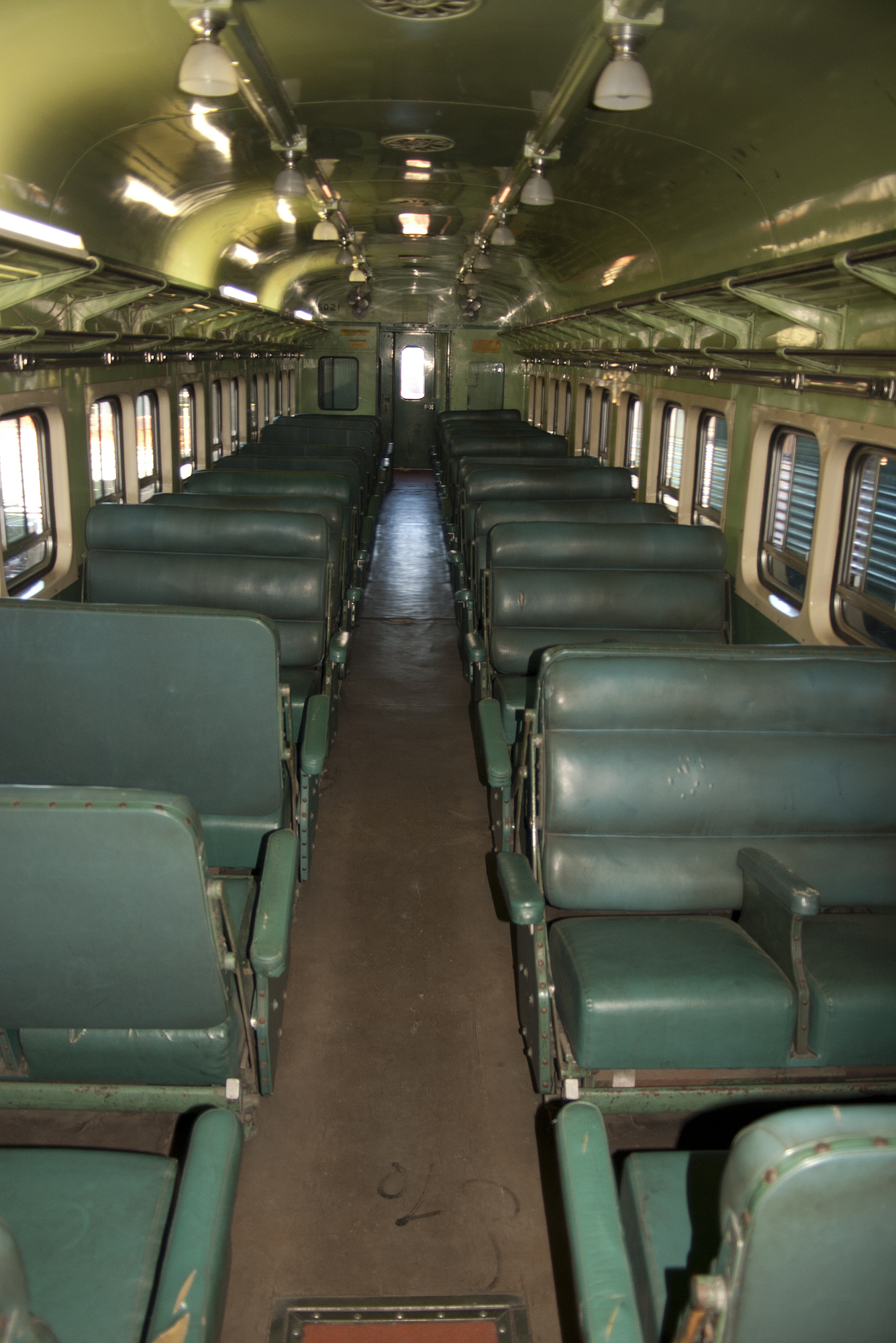
CF5021 with a two-tone green interior

The U sets initially operated on the Main Western line as far as Bowenfels which was the limit of the electrified system at the time. This was cut back to Lithgow in 1974. As the electrified network expanded they began to operate to Gosford (23 January 1960), Wyong (April 1982), Newcastle (June 1984), Port Kembla (February 1986) and Dapto (January 1993). The U sets were supplemented by V set double deck sets from 1970.

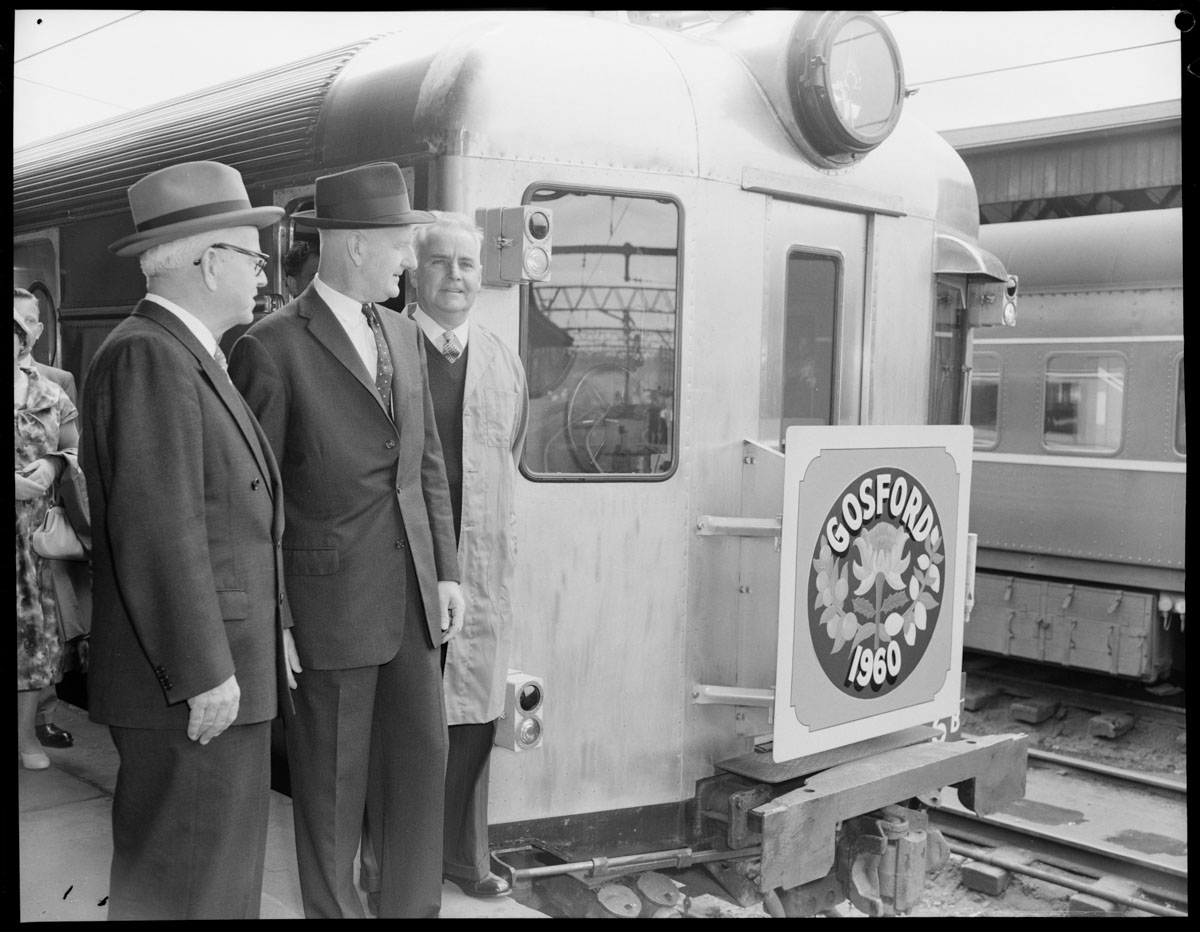
Bob Heffron (left), Then-premier of New South Wales and Railway Commissioner Neil McCusker with a U Set at Sydney Central railway station for the inauguration of electric services to Gosford on 23 January 1960.

First class travel was abolished on 1 September 1974. This saw the removal of the word "Second" on all carriages and also allowed non-first class passengers to enjoy the benefits of non-smoking carriages for the first time.

From the mid-1970s many had their original lift-up windows replaced by Beclawat sliding windows. The interiors were originally in brown and green, but some would receive two-tone green interior repaints. The headlights would also be replaced with twin beam headlights and the original pantographs changed to Airmate types.

Between 1973 and 1993, some carriages were damaged in accidents beyond repair and scrapped.

Accident	Date	Carriage (s)	Aftermath
Burned while at Gosford	11 January 1973	CF5034 and ETB6033	Both cars scrapped in 1976
Damaged in Flemington shunting mishap	March 1978	CF5038 and TF6018	Both cars scrapped in August 1981
Damaged at Gosford	11 January 1982	CF5016	Scrapped on site
Damaged in Flemington shunting mishap	27 October 1983	CF5002	Scrapped at Elcar works, Chullora
Damaged in Flemington shunting mishap	25 December 1989	CF5009	Scrapped on site in May 1990
Collision with electric locomotives 8627 and 8612 at Lithgow	22 July 1993	CF5032	Scrapped on site

Official withdrawal of the sets began in 1994 as new Tangara G sets began replacing them. The first Tangara G sets entered service in June 1994 and as they were progressively put into service through to late 1995 the U sets were progressively withdrawn.

The final run of the U sets on the Main Western Line for Blue Mountains services was in late February 1996 after which they only performed revenue services on the Northern Line between Sydney and Newcastle. The very last U sets were withdrawn in early November 1996.

The final revenue service performed by a U set was on Tuesday afternoon 29 October 1996 – a four car set operating a Newcastle to Sydney service. The final passenger service was on set "U3" (CF5008, TF6004, TF6020 and CF5022).

The final U set to run under its own power was a Sydney Electric Train Society (SETS) Farewell tour two days later on Sunday, 3 November, 1996, performed by an eight car set targeted "U1" (CF5005, ETB6040, TF6005, CF5037, CF5019, TF6010, ETB6031 and CF5011). Many carriages would be scrapped following withdrawal, although a number of carriages have been preserved.

== Preservation ==
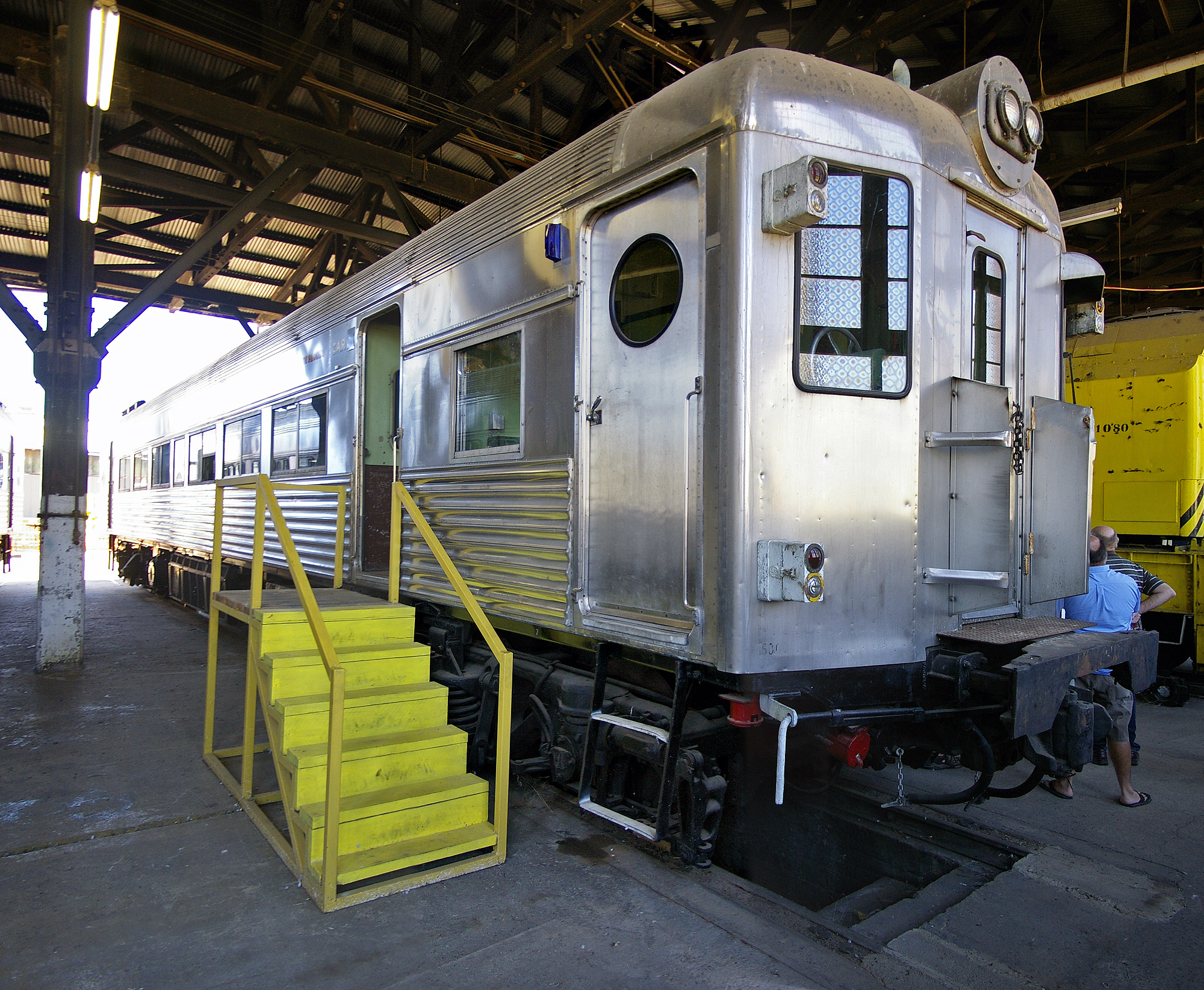
Surviving motor carriage CF5003 at on display at the Junee Roundhouse Museum In 2011

SETS first began to campaign for preservation of a four car set in 1993. Although they also recommended to CityRail the retention of an extra motor car as a spare. The first five cars recommended were class leader CF5001, ETB6032, TF6010, CF5017 and CF5035.In 1995, SETS decided to swap CF5017 for CF5007 while still wishing to save CF5001 and CF5035, the latter of which was damaged in a collision and needed repair. This process would be prolonged by many carriages having cracks found in the under frames.

However in the end, of the three motor carriages originally recommended, only one, CF5035, was selected with CF5007 changed back to CF5017 while the third motor car would be CF5015. The trailers would end up being TF6013 and ETB6029. CF5015 was on display at Central for the railways 140 year anniversary. These five carriages would remain in SETS care until 1997, when SETS went on to pursue owning their own rolling stock, leaving some members who had left to form Historic Electric Traction (HET) to take up the mantel.

These carriages are planned to return into charter traffic as set "U2" bridging the gap between the target numbers of heritage suburban sets F1 and W3. Valley Heights Railway Depot and Museum has custody of ETB6039 on static display.

The Richmond Vale Railway Museum equired eight trailer carriages. These were ETB6026, TF6001, TF6002, TF6008, TF6009, TF6011, TF6012, and TF6019. In 2017, ETB6026, TF6001 and TF6002 were damaged by bush fires which resulted in the museum's closure. The rest of their U set carriages remain in storage. All of these cars became part of the state owned heritage collection following the formation of Transport Heritage NSW in 2013.

In 1998, the Hunter Valley Railway Trust (HVRT) were sold five cars including CF5001. The others were CF5011, ETB6023, ETB6032 and CF5005. All but CF5001 were scrapped in 2013.

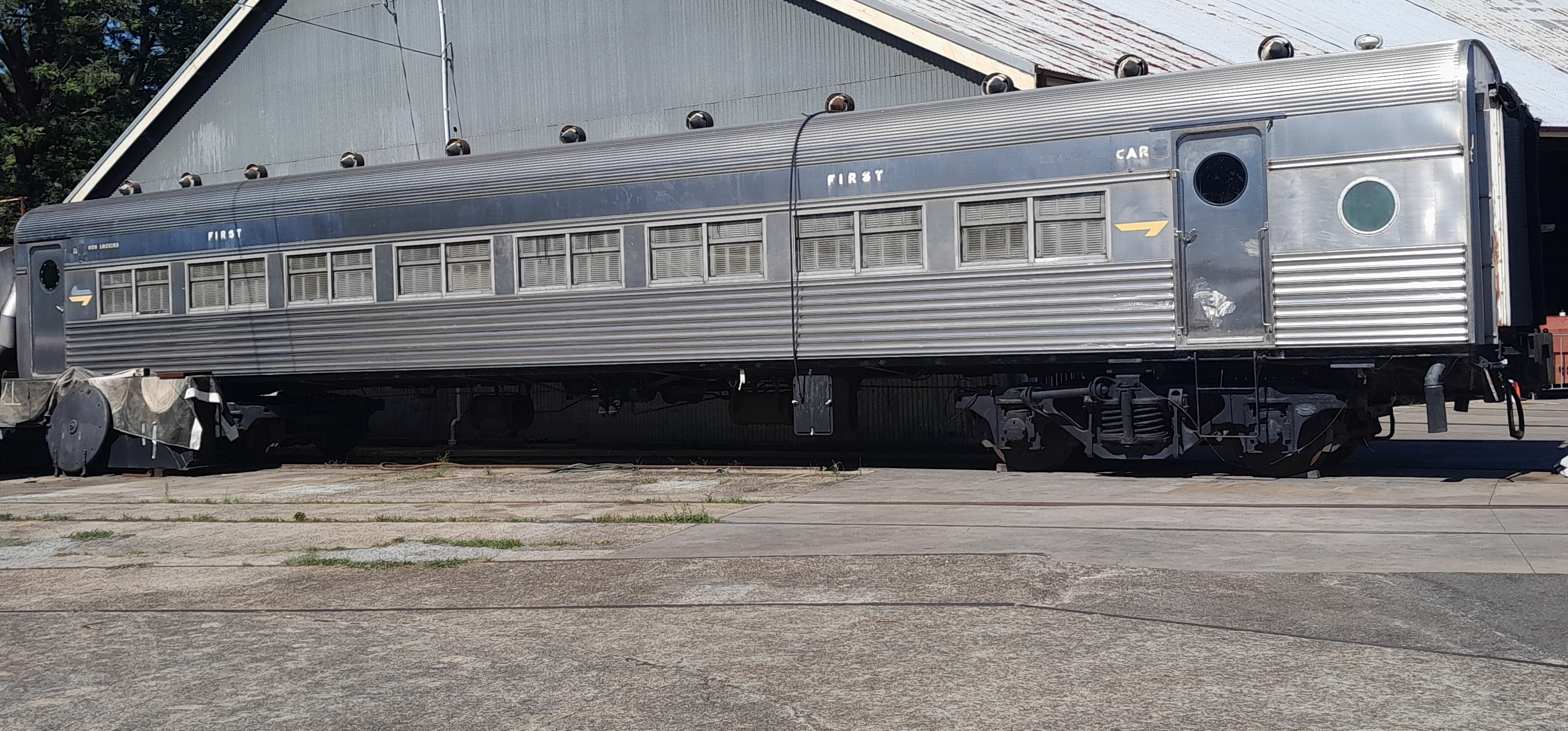
ETB6039 on static display at the Valley Heights Railway Museum in 2026

SETS owns six carriages. They own motor carriages CF5003, CF5021 and CF5022 with trailers TF6010 and ETB6037 which were all purchased on 9 September 1998.

These five were stored at Goulburn before they were displaced with most ending up on an unknown property. In 2013, They purchased CF5001 off of HVRT to save the carriage from being scrapped with the rest of the formers carriages along with 46 class electric locomotive 4627.

CF5003 and CF5021 remained at Hornsby until 2009 when they went on display at the Junee Roundhouse Museum before 17 June 2018, when along with locomotives 4615 and 8606 were transferred to Lithgow by Locomotive 8230. The rest of SETS U set fleet are stored on an unknown property in Rothbury. The Glenreagh Mountain Railway has cars ETB6031, ETB6035, TF6004, TF6005, TF6014 and TF6020 which were all used as steam locomotive hauled carriage stock.

On 24 November 1998, five carriages were purchased by members of SETS. All five cars are stored at Molong. These were motor cars CF5006, CF5010 and CF5027 with trailers TF6006 and ETB6038, the latter of which retains it's lift up windows. Motor carriages CF5004 and CF5024 remain coupled together and stored at the Dorrigo Steam Railway and Museum.

The surviving carriages are as follows:

The following carriages have been retained for heritage reasons:
Number	Location	Owner	Status	Notes
CF5001	Rothbury, NSW	SETS	Stored	Missing traction motors
CF5003	Lithgow, NSW	SETS	Stored	
CF5004	Dorrigo, NSW	Keith Jones	Static display	Missing pantograph
CF5006	Molong, NSW	SETS (Unofficial)	Stored	
CF5010	Molong, NSW	SETS (Unofficial)	Stored	
CF5015	Redfern, NSW	Sydney Trains/Transport Heritage NSW	Under restoration	
CF5017	Redfern, NSW	Sydney Trains/Transport Heritage NSW	Under restoration	
CF5021	Lithgow, NSW	SETS	Stored	
CF5022	Rothbury, NSW	SETS	Stored	On the final revenue U set service
CF5024	Dorrigo, NSW	Keith Jones	Static display	
CF5027	Molong, NSW	SETS (Unofficial)	Stored	
CF5035	Redfern, NSW	Sydney Trains/Transport Heritage NSW	Under restoration	
ETB6029	Redfern, NSW	Sydney Trains/Transport Heritage NSW	Under restoration	
ETB6031	Dorrigo, NSW	The Glenreagh Mountain Railway	Stored	
ETB6035	Dorrigo, NSW	The Glenreagh Mountain Railway	Stored	
ETB6037	Rothbury, NSW	SETS	Stored	
ETB6038	Molong, NSW	SETS (Unofficial)	Stored	
ETB6039	Valley Heights, NSW	Transport Heritage NSW	Static display	Only trailer carriage on static display
TF6004	Dorrigo, NSW	The Glenreagh Mountain Railway	Stored	On the final revenue U set service
TF6005	Dorrigo, NSW	The Glenreagh Mountain Railway	Stored	
TF6006	Molong, NSW	SETS (Unofficial)	Stored	
TF6008	Richmond, NSW	Transport Heritage NSW	Stored	
TF6009	Richmond, NSW	Transport Heritage NSW	Stored	
TF6010	Rothbury, NSW	SETS	Stored	
TF6011	Richmond, NSW	Transport Heritage NSW	Stored	
TF6012	Richmond, NSW	Transport Heritage NSW	Stored	
TF6013	Redfern, NSW	Sydney Trains/Transport Heritage NSW	Under restoration	
TF6014	Dorrigo, NSW	The Glenreagh Mountain Railway	Stored	
TF6019	Richmond, NSW	Transport Heritage NSW	Stored	
TF6020	Dorrigo, NSW	The Glenreagh Mountain Railway	Stored	

=== In popular culture and privately owned carriages ===
- Some carriages were modified for usage in the 1999 sci-fi film The Matrix, where they are used by the protagonist Neo to run over his adversary Agent Smith. These carriages still retained their City Rail logo but the power carriage in the set, CF5025, was given lighting reminiscent of the Brown Line (CTA), used in Chicago, Illinois.
- Trailer TF6011 was featured in numerous scenes of Like Minds (2006).
- A preserved U set carriage appeared in Guy Sebastian's "Standing with You" music video in 2020.

31 cars were purchased for private usage. One of these cars, CF5028 was burned by arson in 1999.

Car Number	Date Sold	Original Location	Current Location	Owner	Notes
CF5007	25/03/1999	Trangie, NSW	Trangie, NSW	Tandarra Caravan Park	Wears "U5" target plate
CF5012	14/01/1999	Boorawa, NSW	Hovells Creek, NSW	Unknown	
CF5013	12/1998	Bateman's Bay, NSW	Unknown	Unknown	
CF5014	01/1997	Alderville, NSW	Alderville, NSW	Alderville Public School	
CF5018	05/01/1999	Orange, NSW	Unknown	Unknown	
CF5019	29/11/1999	Clyde, NSW	The Oaks, NSW	Unknown	
CF5020	20/08/1999	Clyde, NSW	Bilpin, NSW	Unknown	
CF5023	16/08/2000	Redfern, NSW	Forster-Tuncurry, NSW	Unknown	
CF5025	02/2000	Clyde, NSW	Londonderry, NSW (?)	Unknown	
CF5026	06/03/2000	Clyde, NSW	Schofields, NSW	Unknown	
CF5029	27/04/1999	Boorawa, NSW	Hovells Creek, NSW	Unknown	
CF5030	01/02/1999	Razorback, NSW	Unknown	Unknown	
CF5031	06/01/1999	Camden, NSW	Bringelly, NSW	Unknown	
CF5033	21/01/1999	Camden, NSW	Londonderry, NSW	Unknown	
CF5039	12/2000	Clyde, NSW	Nimmitabel, NSW	Unknown	
CF5040	09/02/1999	Charlton, VC	Wallan, VC	Unknown	
ETB6021	05/01/1999	Camden, NSW	South Windsor, NSW	Unknown	
ETB6022	15/12/1998	Bateman's Bay, NSW	Unknown	Unknown	
ETB6024	10/12/1998	Dungog, NSW	Dungog, NSW	Dungog Primary School	
ETB6025	01/03/2000	Clyde, NSW	Wyong, NSW	Unknown	
ETB6027	24/11/1998	Marayla, NSW	Unknown	Unknown	
ETB6028	16/12/1999	Razorback, NSW	Unknown	Unknown	
ETB6030	24/07/1999	Braidwood, NSW	Unknown	Unknown	
ETB6034	?	Rlystone, NSW	Kandos, NSW	Kandos Public School	
ETB6036	11/12/1998	Coonabarabran, NSW	Unknown	Unknown	
ETB6040	06/09/1999	Camden, NSW	Wilton, NSW	Unknown	
TF6003	30/11/1998	Carinda, NSW	Unknown	Unknown	
TF6007	25/11/1998	Carinda, NSW	Unknown	Unknown	
TF6015	07/12/1998	Maraylya, NSW	Unknown	Unknown	
TF6016	?	Morrsett, NSW	Unknown	Unknown	
TF6017	15/02/1999	Condobolin, NSW	Unknown	Unknown	
