= E. M. G. Eddy =

Australian railway commissioner (1851–1897)

Edward Miller Gard Eddy
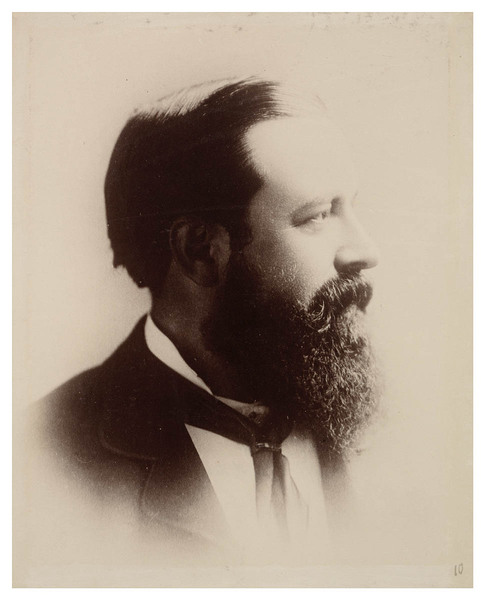
- Edward Miller Gard Eddy
- Born: 24 April 1851; England
- Died: 21 June 1897 (aged 46); Wallangarra, Queensland, Australia
- Occupation: Chief Commissioner of NSW Railways (1888—1897)
- Years active: 1865—1897

Edward Miller Gard Eddy (24 July 1851 – 21 June 1897) was Chief Commissioner of Railways in colonial New South Wales 1888–1897. It has been said of him that "No abler administrator has ever been connected with railway management in Australia".

== History ==
Eddy was born in England, a son of Edward Miller Eddy, a marine engineer. In 1865 he began working as a junior clerk with the London and North Western Railway. He was soon promoted to the general superintendent's office, working under G. P. Neele, known for railway timetable design, and later superintendent of LNWR.

In 1888 the Railways Act was passed, putting three commissioners in charge of the colonial railways of New South Wales, Australia: Eddy (as chief commissioner), William Meeke Fehon and Charles Oliver. When he arrived, the network included many lines built for political reasons but of no value to the state's economy. One of his first actions was to persuade government that no line should be constructed until approved by the Commissioners. He also impressed on Premier Parkes the importance of standardization of railway gauge throughout the State, which was suffering from a multiplicity of gauges. 5ft 3in had been originally agreed on by New South Wales, Victoria and South Australia, but in 1853 unilaterally abandoned by NSW in favour of 4ft 8½in for reasons of economy. By 1889 the State had 3,340 miles (5,380 km) of the former and 4,509 miles (7,257 km) of the latter, so 4ft 8½in became the NSW standard.

He was a tireless reformer, and having a broad knowledge of railway practice, his opinions were respected by business, politicians and his staff, who found him diligent but fair in his treatment of those for whom he was responsible. His reformist zeal initially met with open hostility and secret intrigue, but he overcame resistance through by stubborn strength and clarity of vision. R. L. Nash, financial editor of the Sydney Daily Telegraph and previously with The Economist, reckoned in 1896 that, under Eddy, New South Wales railways were the "most efficiently maintained, the best managed, and the most profitable of all the State railways systems of Australasia".

Eddy Avenue, at Sydney's Central station, is named in his honour.

== Personal ==
Eddy married the widow Gwen Ellen Lowndes, née Roberts (died 1882), on 29 October 1874; they had a daughter and three sons. On 15 April 1886 he married again, to Ellen Wilkinson. Their Sydney home was a fine house in spacious grounds on the new South Head Road, Double Bay, later owned by James Macken of Mark Foy's.

On 14 June 1897 he left for Queensland, for a planned holiday in the north combined with an inspection of railways closer to the border, but was prevailed on by R. J. Gray, the Queensland Commissioner, to remain in Brisbane, after collapsing at Wallangarra station from the symptoms of gout. His wife had already checked into the Gresham Hotel, Brisbane where he died on 21 June.
