= New South Wales Government Railways =

Rail transport agency in NSW, 1855–1932

New South Wales Government Railways (NSWGR)
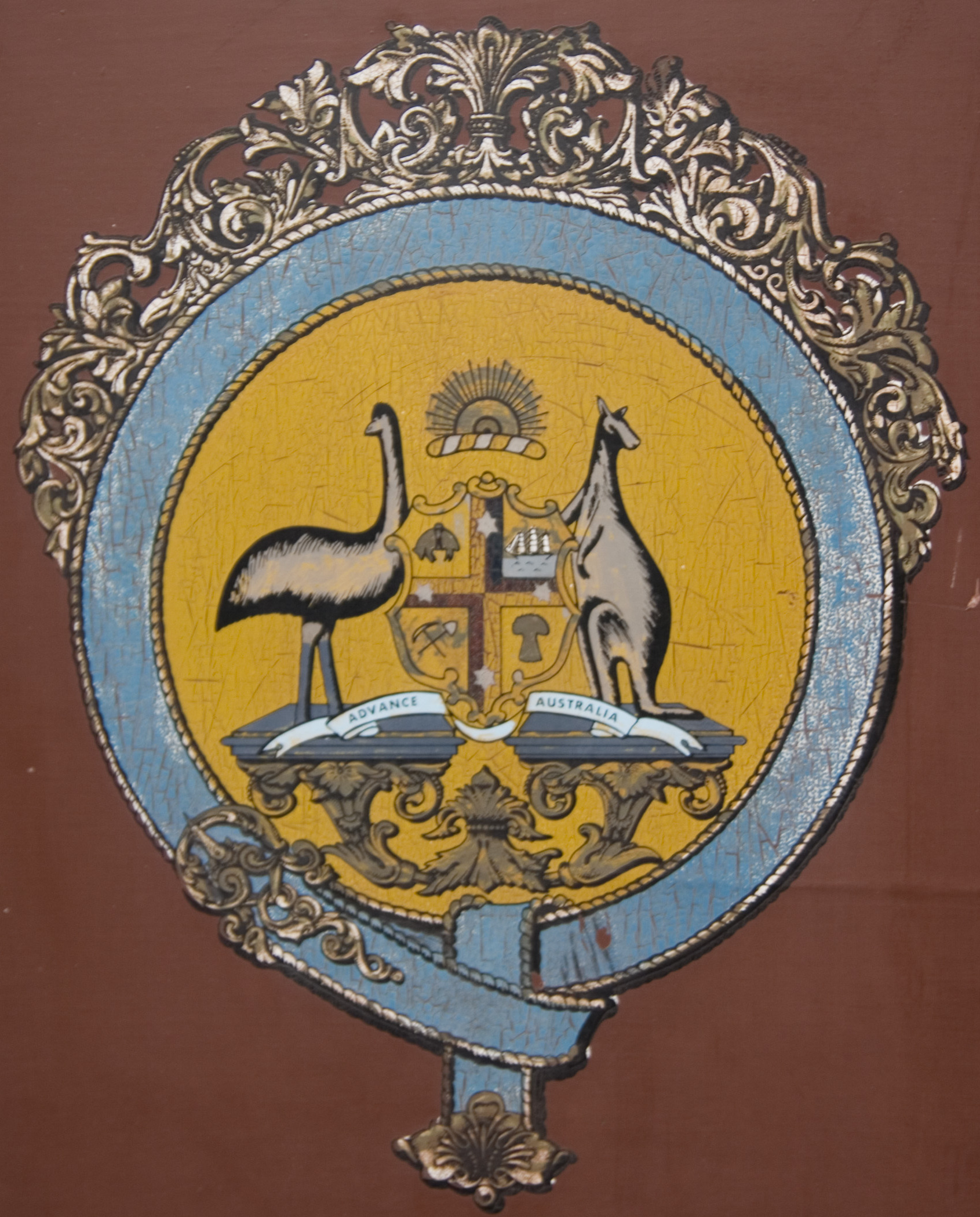
- Crest of the New South Wales Govt. Railways

Commission overview
- Formed: 1855
- Dissolved: 1932
- Superseding Commission: Department of Railways
- Jurisdiction: New South Wales
- Headquarters: Sydney
- Minister responsible: Minister for Transport

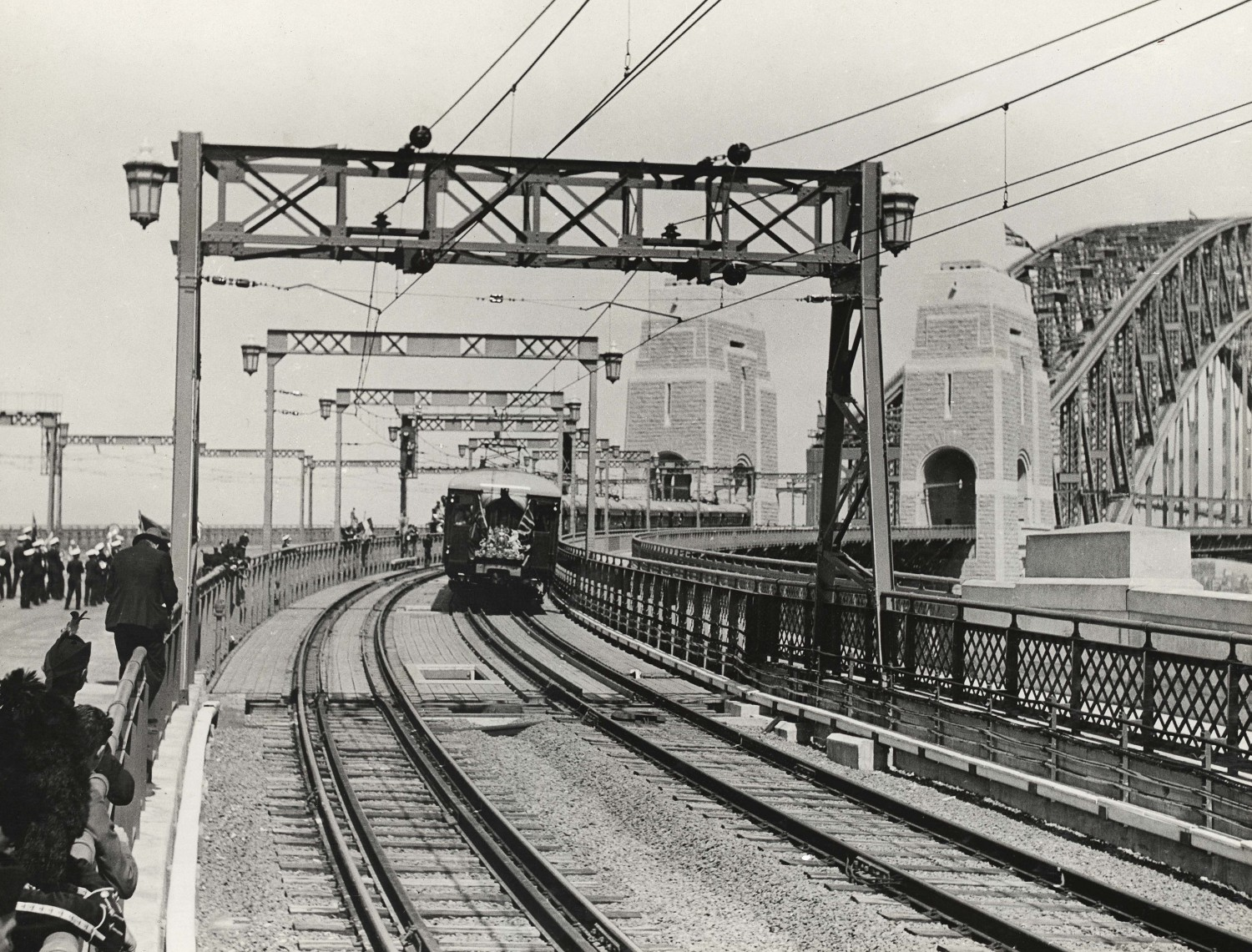
A Standard stock electric suburban set, the first passenger train over the Sydney Harbour Bridge in 1932

New South Wales Government Railways (NSWGR) was an agency of the Government of New South Wales which administered rail transport in the colony, and then the state, of New South Wales, Australia, between 1855 and 1932.

== History ==
The NSWGR built its entire route network to standard gauge. Its first line, also the first railway of New South Wales, was the railway line from Sydney to Parramatta (today: Granville railway station) completed in 1855.

The agency was managed by a range of different commission structures between 1857 and 1932, which reported to either the Minister for Public Works or the Minister for Transport.

The inaugural Chief Commissioner was Ben Martindale and, following the enactment of the Government Railway Act, 1858 (NSW) he became Commissioner of Railways. John Rae succeeded Martindale in 1861, and in 1877 Charles Goodchap was appointed Commissioner. The Government Railway Act, 1888 (NSW) set up a corporate body of three railway commissioners to manage the railways and remove them from political influence, resulting in the resignation of Goodchap.

This Board of Railway Commissioners of New South Wales was in place from 22 October 1888 to 4 April 1907, and was replaced by a sole Chief Commissioner of Railways and Tramways until 22 March 1932, when a panel arrangement was restored for a period of nine months, with the Transport Commissioners of New South Wales. On 29 December 1932, the Department of Railways New South Wales was established and Thomas Joseph Hartigan was appointed Commissioner for Railways replacing the functions of the Chief Transport Commissioner. The Department of Railways New South Wales become the official name of the railway and was used on most documentation (drawings & other paperwork), the NSWGR title was still used periodically on public documentation such as advertising and timetables. This continued until the creation of the Public Transport Commission on 20 October 1972. The last Commissioner for Railways was Neil McCusker.

=== Executives ===
==== Chief Commissioner for Railways and Tramways ====
#	Chief Commissioner	Term	Notes
1	Tom Richard Johnson	4 April 1907 – 3 April 1914	
2	John Harper	4 April 1914 – 31 December 1916 (Note: In December 1914 Harper was granted leave of absence on account of illness, and never resumed the position. Fraser was acting commissioner from January 1915 – December 1916.)	
3	James Fraser	1 January 1917 – 30 November 1929	
4	William James Cleary	1 December 1929 – 22 March 1932	

==== Chief Transport Commissioner ====
#	Chief Commissioner	Term	Notes
1	Charles Joachim Goode	22 March 1932 – 3 August 1932	
2	William James Cleary	3 August 1932 – 29 December 1932	
Succeeded by Commissioner for Railways.

== Legacy ==
The agency was succeeded by the Department of Railways on 1 January 1915; and then following the enactment of the Public Transport Commission Act, 1972 (NSW), the Public Transport Commission was formed; later to become the State Rail Authority on 1 July 1980. Further restructures in 1996, 2001 and 2003 resulted in the establishment of the RailCorp, the agency currently responsible for the Sydney suburban and interurban rail network and rural passenger services, and for providing government and commercial freight operators with access to the rails of the Sydney metropolitan area. On 1 July 2013, the operational responsibilities of RailCorp were transferred to NSW TrainLink and Sydney Trains.

== Infrastructure ==
The agency built all of their track to the 4 ft 8 1/2 in (1,435 mm) standard gauge and ran its first official passenger train on 26 September 1855, between the Sydney terminal (just south of the current Central) and Parramatta junction (just past Granville) railway stations.

The agency was also a significant electricity generator. It operated several power stations, notably at Ultimo, White Bay, Lithgow, and Zaara Street, Newcastle, until its generation and transmission assets were taken over by the Electricity Commission of New South Wales, on 1 January 1953.

== Rolling stock ==
In 1936, the company owned 1187 locomotives, 457 railcars, 1445 coaches, 172 brake vans and 22,068 goods wagons.

== See also ==
- Rail transport in New South Wales
