= W. M. Fehon =

William Meeke Fehon (5 March 1834 – 4 February 1911) was a businessman in Victoria and New South Wales. His appointment as a New South Wales Railways Commissioner and consequent Royal Commission, led to the downfall of the Parkes Ministry.

== History ==
Fehon was born in London, a son of Sarah Fehon, née Greenhaus, and John Fehon, in business as a printer. He was educated at Brixton school, and started work as a clerk in 1851. He was next employed by Eastern Counties Railway followed by two years with Canada's Great Western Railway.

Following an invitation by his brother, Fehon arrived in Victoria in April 1858, finding employment with the Victoria railways. In 1864 he was promoted to assistant traffic superintendent and in 1869 traffic manager.

Fehon resigned in 1872 to join the freight business of William McCulloch & Co. In 1880 the company expanded its operations by association with Wright Heaton & Co., a New South Wales freight company.

In 1888, at the invitation of Premier Henry Parkes, he accepted a seven-year appointment as one of the Commissioners of Railways in New South Wales under E. M. G. Eddy.

In 1889 charges were levelled against Fehon, that McCulloch & Co., and Wright Heaton & Co. received preferential treatment from the Victorian railways in the carriage of bales of wool, being charged the 250lb rate for some 400lb bales, but collecting the full price from consignees. Despite lack of evidence against Fehon, Jack Want called a successful censure motion on Premier Parkes, who subsequently resigned.

In 1896 Fehon was offered a position by the Victorian government but declined. He was reappointed by G. H. Reid for a further seven years.

In 1902 he was reappointed by Sir John See for a further seven years.

In 1906 the Legislative council passed the Railway Commissioners Appointment Act, with the provision that it should not take effect until a new set of commissioners had been selected. So Fehon retired in April 1907 along with David Kirkcaldie and Chief commissioner C. N. J. Oliver was replaced by Tom Richard Johnson.

== Family ==
Fehon married Ann "Annie" Gumm (c. 1835 – 19 October 1907) on 1 May 1856. One son and one daughter survived to adulthood.

- Alice Louisa Fehon (born 20 February 1863 – 1926) married James Cuming on 3 February 1885
- William A. Fehon married Nora Newell on 7 September 1886

They had a home "The Poplars", Footscray later "Huntingtower", Homebush Road, Homebush.
