= Reg Winsor =

Australian railway administrator (1891–1963)

Reginald Winsor (5 July 1891 – 21 October 1963) was a railways administrator in New South Wales.

== History ==
Winsor was born in Singleton, New South Wales, a son of Richard "Dick" Winsor (died August 1949), a railwayman, and Mary Winsor, née Gordon (died August 1953). At first the family lived on the Kelso side of the tracks, later in Argyle Street.

He was educated at Singleton and at age 15 followed his father into the railways service, starting as a junior porter or in the parcels office.

In 1929 he was sacked from his position as outdoor advertising salesman. He took the Department to court and had his appointment restored.

He became Chief Staff Superintendent in 1942 and in 1948 Assistant to Garside's Commissioner of Railways.

In September, 1949, he was appointed Commissioner for Road Transport and Tramways, and in May 1950, he was appointed Director of the Transport and Highways' Commission, at a salary of £5,500, a position superior to that of Garside, who retired in February 1952, to be replaced by James Fraser's son Keith Aird Fraser who, however, died on 23 August 1952.

The newly elected Premier Cahill abolished the Transport and Highways Commission and appointed Winsor Railways Commissioner, at the reduced salary. Against his wishes, Neal McCusker (often misspelled Neil) was in July 1955 appointed senior executive officer. After a series of accidents and service delays Winsor was on 31 July 1956 obliged to resign, replaced by McCusker.

== Personal ==
On 15 March 1920 Winsor married Hilda May McDonagh (died 1982). No further information has been found.

== See also ==
- New South Wales Government Railways 1855–1932
- Department of Railways New South Wales 1932–1972
- Public Transport Commission 1972–1980
- State Rail Authority 1980–
- Minister for Transport (New South Wales) list of ministers
