= Frederick Charles Garside =

Commissioner for Railways in New South Wales (1887–1970)

Frederick Charles Garside (5 February 1887 – 24 July 1970) was a Commissioner for Railways in New South Wales.

== History ==
Garside was born in Burwood, New South Wales, eldest of five sons of Eli Garside (c. 1862 – 11 June 1932) and Eleanor Garside, née Coleman (c. 1862 – 22 August 1941), who married on 13 January 1886.

Garside grew up in Goulburn and joined the New South Wales Government Railways in 1903 as an apprentice fitter at the Eveleigh Railway Workshops, Sydney.

In 1914 he transferred to Newcastle where he was responsible for locomotive assignment.

In December 1932 T. J. Hartigan was appointed Railway Commissioner and Garside Assistant Commissioner, effective 1 January 1933. Their appointments were renewed in 1939 Garside was appointed Railway Commissioner following the compulsory retirement of T. J. Hartigan in August 1948.

One of his first acts was to suspend the Inquiry Committee set up by Hartigan to investigate the efficiency of the Railway Department, and refused, against the wishes of Premier McGirr to restore it. This was expected to work against Garside's job security. Garside was also blamed for several railway strikes. In 1950 the government passed the Transport and Highways bill; Garside's assistant Reg Winsor was made Director of Transport and Highways, over his head, with an annual salary of £5,500.

Garside retired on 4 February 1952 aged 65, and left for a holiday in England. His replacement as Railway Commissioner was Keith Aird Fraser, son of James Fraser, Railway Commissioner from 1917 to 1929. The new appointee died a few months later, on 23 August 1952.

The newly-elected Premier Cahill abolished the position of Director of Transport and Highways and appointed Winsor as Commissioner of Railways.

== Family ==
Garside married Treasure Mabel Coombs on 27 September 1911. She was a daughter of railwayman James Henry Coombs (1850 – 18 November 1913) and Sophia Coombs, née Woodward, (died 12 January 1935) who married in 1875.

- They had four daughters.

He had four brothers: Herbert Ernest Eli, Edward William, Leslie Coleman, and Harry Garside, and one sister, Ruth Margaret Garside (later Wood).
