= Eddy Avenue =

Street in Sydney, Australia

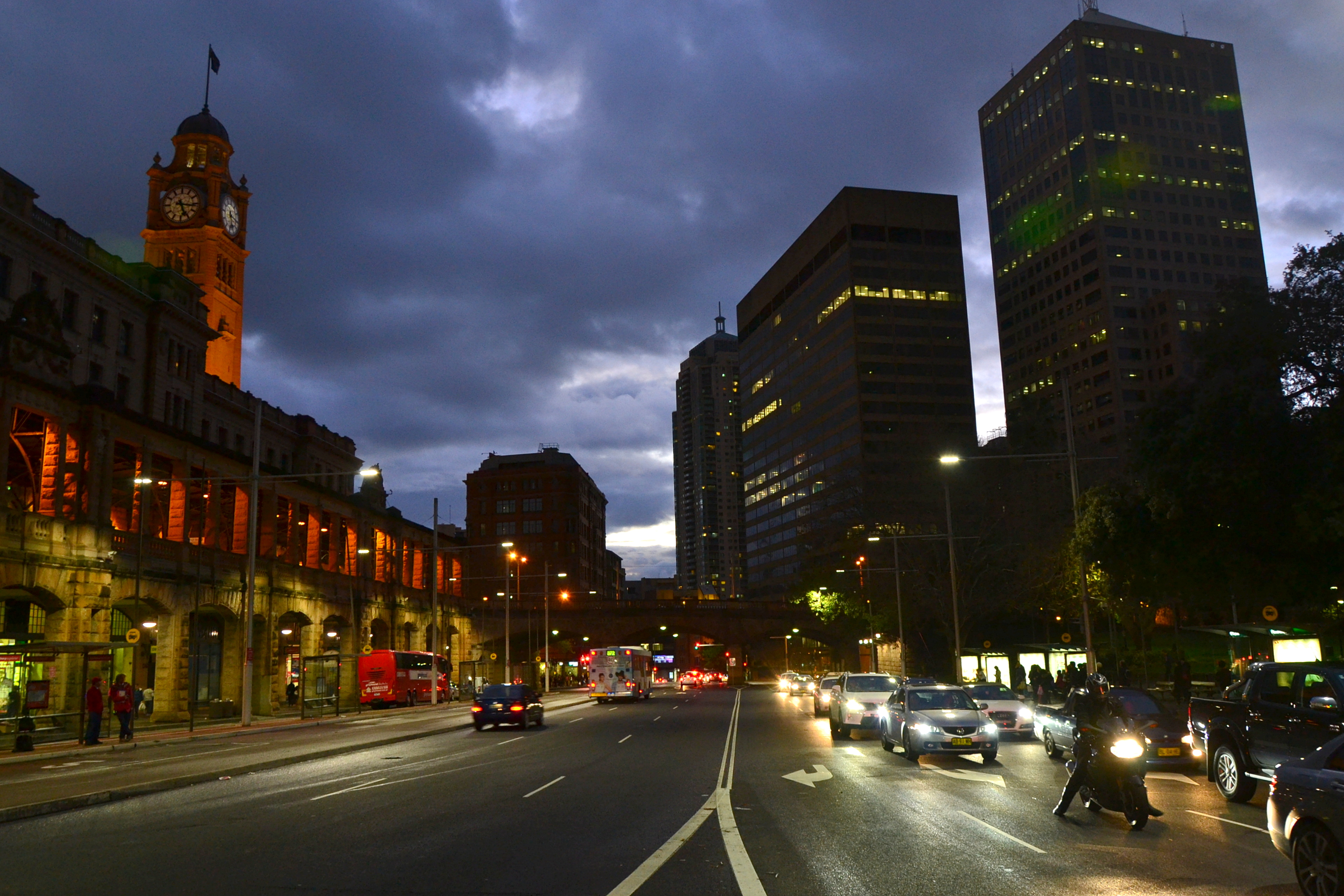
Westbound view in March 2016

Eddy Avenue is a street in the Sydney central business district of New South Wales, Australia. It runs west from Elizabeth Street to Pitt Street outside Central station.

== History ==
Eddy Avenue was built in 1905, during the construction of Central Railway Station. It was named after Edward Eddy, who served as Commissioner of Railways from 1887 to 1897.

== Description ==
Eddy Avenue runs in a north-westerly direction for 200 metres from Elizabeth Street to Pitt Street. To the north Belmore Park runs along its full length, while to the south is Central station.

Three lanes of road traffic run in each direction. On its northern side it has a row of bus stops that are served by Transdev John Holland and Transit Systems services to the Eastern Suburbs. On the southern side, two bus stands were served by Sydney Buses services to Railway Square and Greyhound Australia interstate services. In April 2017, the coach bays relocated to the western forecourt of Central station. Since the introduction of the light rail services, the Big Bus Tours sightseeing services stop in Pitt Street just south of Eddy Avenue.

Until the early 1960s, Eddy Avenue had tram lines running down its central reservation. The CBD and South East Light Rail commenced operation along Eddy Avenue in December 2019 after construction commended in May 2017. In July 1990, the 1910 built tram waiting shed was demolished as part of the construction of the coach terminal.
