= Talbot Duckmanton =

Australian broadcaster and television executive

Sir Talbot Duckmanton CBE
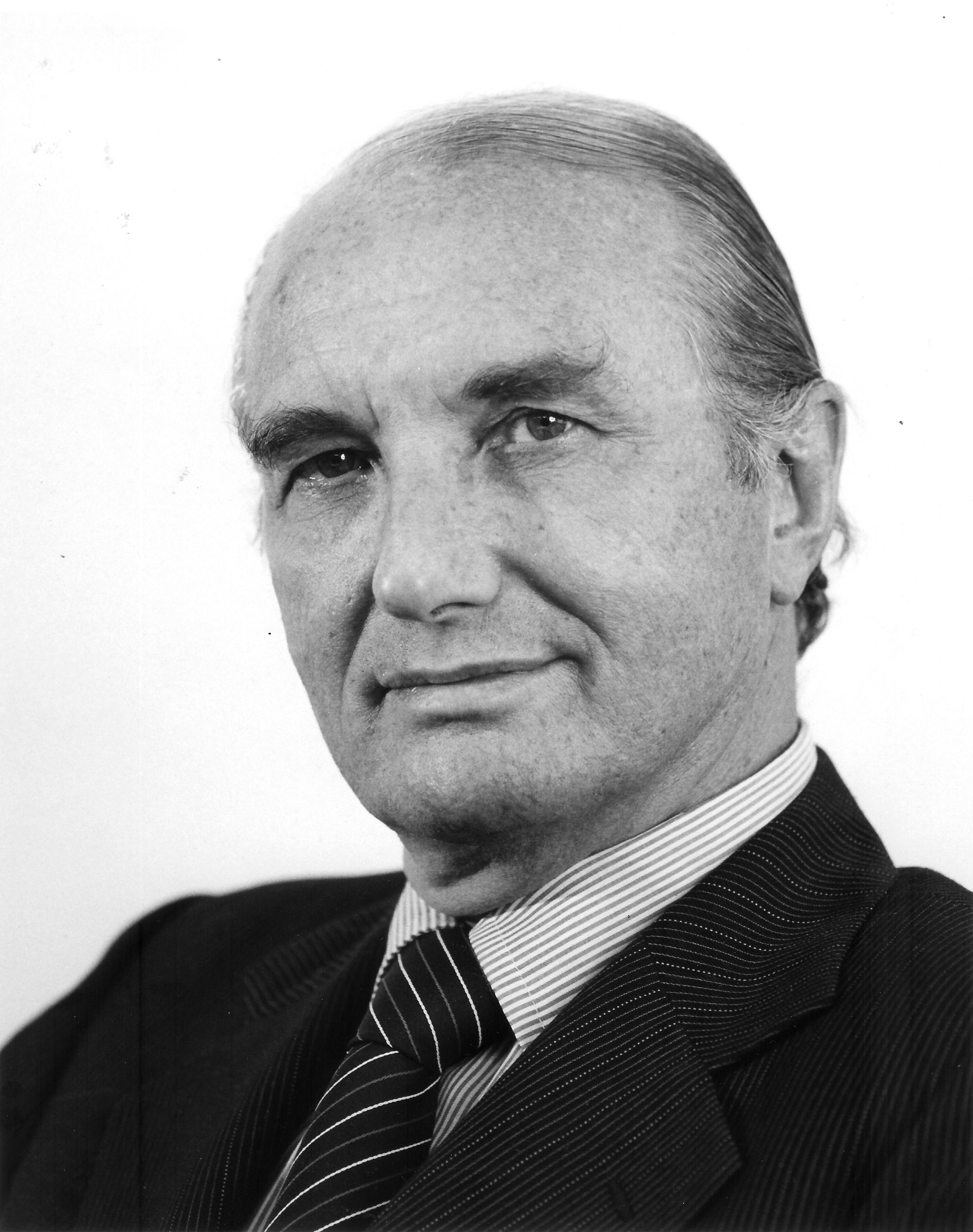

General manager of the Australian Broadcasting Commission
- In office 26 February 1965 – 1 July 1982
- Preceded by: Sir Charles Moses
- Succeeded by: Keith Jennings

Personal details
- Born: Talbot Sydney Duckmanton; 25 October 1921 South Yarra, Victoria, Australia
- Died: 12 June 1995 (aged 73) Gold Coast, Queensland, Australia
- Spouses: Florence Simmonds (m. 1947–1978) Janet Strickland (m. 1979–1981) Carolyn Wright (m. 1982–1984) Janet Strickland (m. 1986–1995)
- Education: Newington College
- Occupation: Broadcaster

Military service
- Allegiance: Australia
- Branch/service: Australian Army (1941–43); Royal Australian Air Force (1943–45)
- Years of service: 1941–1945
- Rank: Flying Officer

Sir Talbot Sydney Duckmanton CBE (25 October 1921 – 12 June 1995) was an Australian broadcaster and radio and television administrator. As general manager of the Australian Broadcasting Commission he oversaw the advent of colour television, ABC Classic FM and Triple J.

== Early life ==
The son of Sidney James Duckmanton and Rita Margaret Hutchins, Duckmanton was born in South Yarra, Melbourne.

== Newington College ==
Duckmanton attended Fort St High and then won a scholarship to Newington College in Sydney 1934–1938. He became a state champion schoolboy athlete and as a rower stroked the Newington 1st Eight. The Drama Centre at Newington is named in his honour. In his final year he was a Prefect and Dux winning the Schofield Scholarship.

== Broadcasting career ==
He began his career as a cadet announcer at the ABC in Sydney in 1939 and had a wide ranging career working as a news announcer and sporting broadcaster. During World War II Duckmanton saw active service in New Guinea in the 2/17th, as a RAAF pilot and was later a war correspondent. From 1952 until 1954 he was the Assistant Manager of the Brisbane office.

He was deputy general manager of the organisation 1964–65, and general manager from 1965 until his retirement in 1982.

It was rumoured and is widely believed that Sir Talbot Duckmanton was responsible for choosing the ABC post office box number 9994 in recognition of Sir Don Bradman's batting average of 99.94. However this only became the ABC's box number in 1983, after Duckmanton's retirement. There is as yet no published evidence that the connection between the box number and Bradman's average was intentional.

== Other offices ==
Talbot Duckmanton was president of the Asia-Pacific Broadcasting Union 1973–77, and president of the Commonwealth Broadcasting Association 1975–82. From 1968 until 1973 he was chairman of the executive committee of Newington College Council.

== ABC legacy ==
In a story published on 4 October 2004 on the ABC Brisbane (612AM) website, a task was set to find a name for the mascot of ABC Brisbane. In an article on the same website published on 27 October 2004, "Talbot" (in honour of Duckmanton) was declared the winner over the other candidate "Gabba" (a reference to the nickname of the Brisbane Cricket Ground in the suburb of Woolloongabba).

== Family life ==
He married Florence Simmonds in 1947 and had four children, Christine, Susan, Craig Talbot and Kim. Florence died in 1978. The following year he married Janet Strickland, the Australian Chief Censor, but they separated two years later. His third marriage was to Carolyn Wright, an Englishwoman. This marriage also lasted only two years. He later remarried Janet Strickland.

== Honours ==
- Commander of the Order of the British Empire 1971 – In recognition of service as the general manager of the ABC
- Knight Bachelor 1980 – In recognition of service to broadcasting
- The Duckmanton Drama Centre 2017 – In recognition of his service to Newington as an Old Newingtonian where he served on the College Council from 1964 to 1978 and as Chairman of the Council Executive from 1968 to 1973.

== Bibliography ==
- Inglis, Ken S., This Is the ABC 1932 – 1983, Black Inc 2006
- Inglis, Ken S., Whose ABC? 1983 – 2006, Black Inc 2006

Preceded by A.D.G. Stewart	Chairman; Newington College Council; 1968–1973	Succeeded by A.E.Donlan

Preceded by Sir Charles Moses	General manager of the Australian Broadcasting Commission; 1965–1982	Succeeded by Keith Jennings
