= Belmore Park =

Park in Sydney, Australia

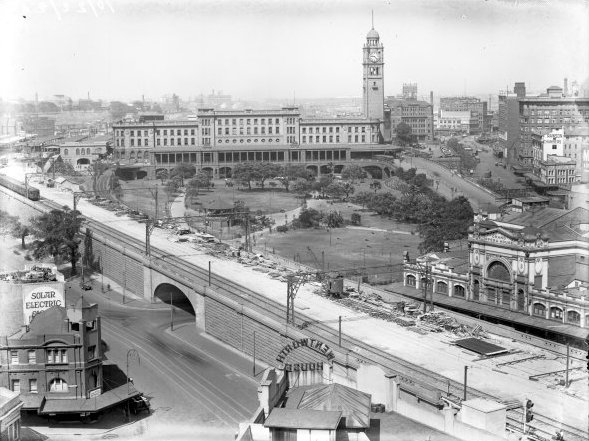
- Belmore Park bounded by Central station and the railway line (1920s)
- Interactive map of Belmore Park
- Location: Hay Street, Eddy Avenue, Elizabeth Street and Pitt Street, Sydney, New South Wales, Australia
- Coordinates: 33°52′53″S 151°12′28″E
- Area: 13 acres (5.3 ha)
- Created: 19 May 1868
- Etymology: Somerset Lowry-Corry, 4th Earl Belmore
- Operator: Sydney City Council
- Status: Open all year

Belmore Park is a public park at the southern end of the Sydney central business district in the Australian state of New South Wales. Adjacent to the Central railway station, the park is bounded by Hay Street, Eddy Avenue, Elizabeth Street and Pitt Street. The area was previously known as Police Paddock and was part of a section of Crown land which included the Police Barracks, Devonshire Street Cemetery, Female Refuge of the Good Samaritan, Benevolent Asylum and a common.

The park is a key public transport hub. The final section of above-ground railway track forms the eastern edge of the park before going underground as the City Circle. Buses in the direction of the Eastern Suburbs including express buses to the University of New South Wales depart from Eddy Avenue along which the CBD and South East Light Rail now runs. The western edge of the park is defined by a roadway ramp to the concourse level of the railway station. The terminus loop of the Inner West Light Rail line forms a ring around the entire park using ramps on both eastern and western edges to access the train station concourse.

== History ==
The area was landscaped and in 1868 it opened as a park dedicated to governor Somerset Lowry-Corry, 4th Earl Belmore. In 1901 the whole area was resumed for the construction of Sydney's Central railway station with the majority of excavated earth placed on the common, burying the original layout. During the 1908–09 Royal Commission for the Improvement of the City of Sydney and Its Suburbs major landscaping works for the area were proposed by commissioner Norman Selfe.

Due to its proximity to the city, and especially to Central station, the park has long been a place for groups to gather—for protests, markets, events or performances. For example, in 1878 in front of a large crowd, Henri L'Estrange unsuccessfully tried twice to launch himself in a gas balloon, while during the 2000 Summer Olympics the park became one of five "live sites" where the games were publicly broadcast. In the late 1860s "Belmore Produce Markets" and Paddy's Markets were built in the area opposite the current park—now known as Haymarket.

In 2026, a plan was proposed that would see the park upgraded with new pathways, improved lighting, new seating and more green space.

== Gallery ==
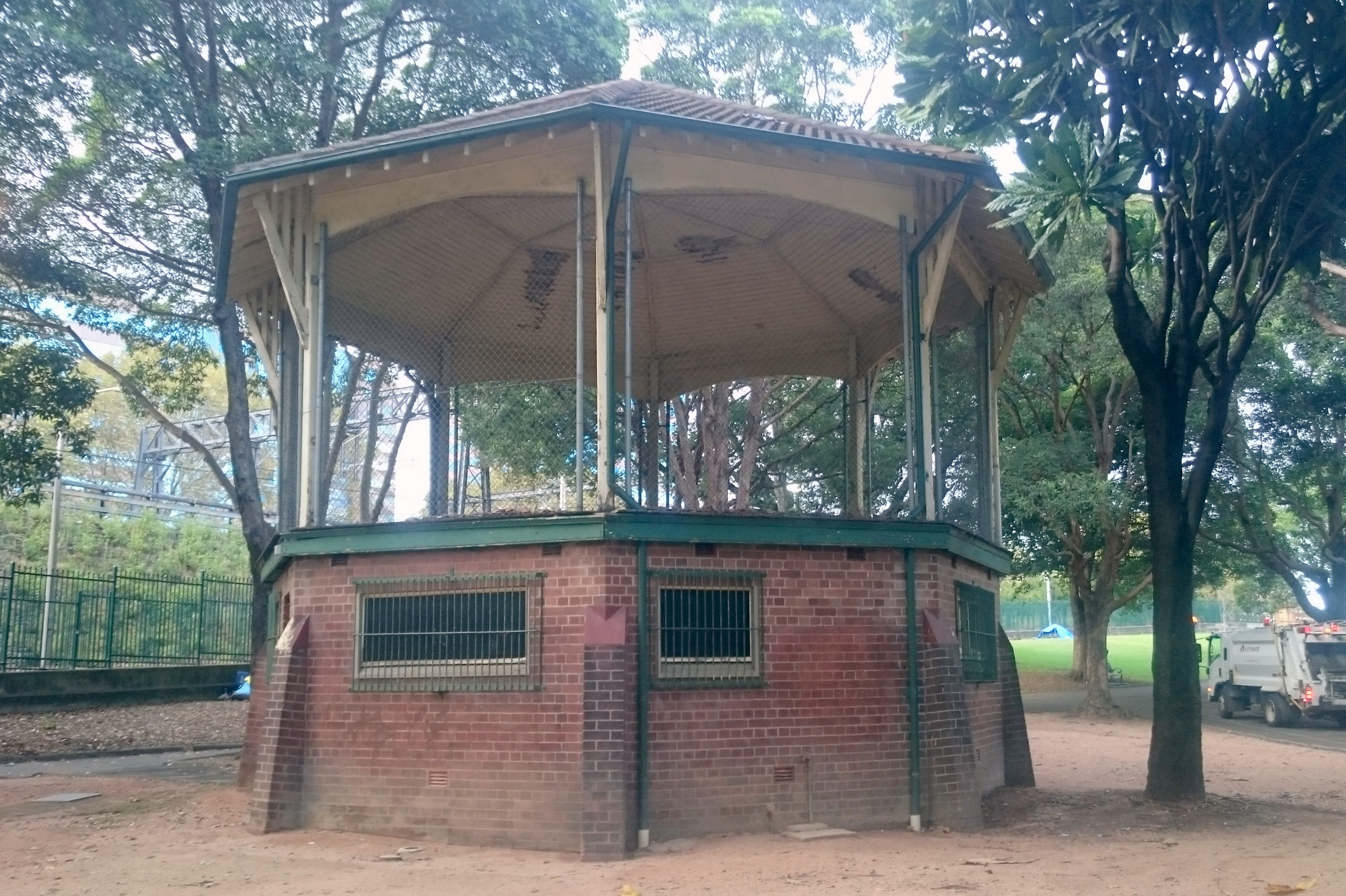
A bandstand, now disused, was built in 1910

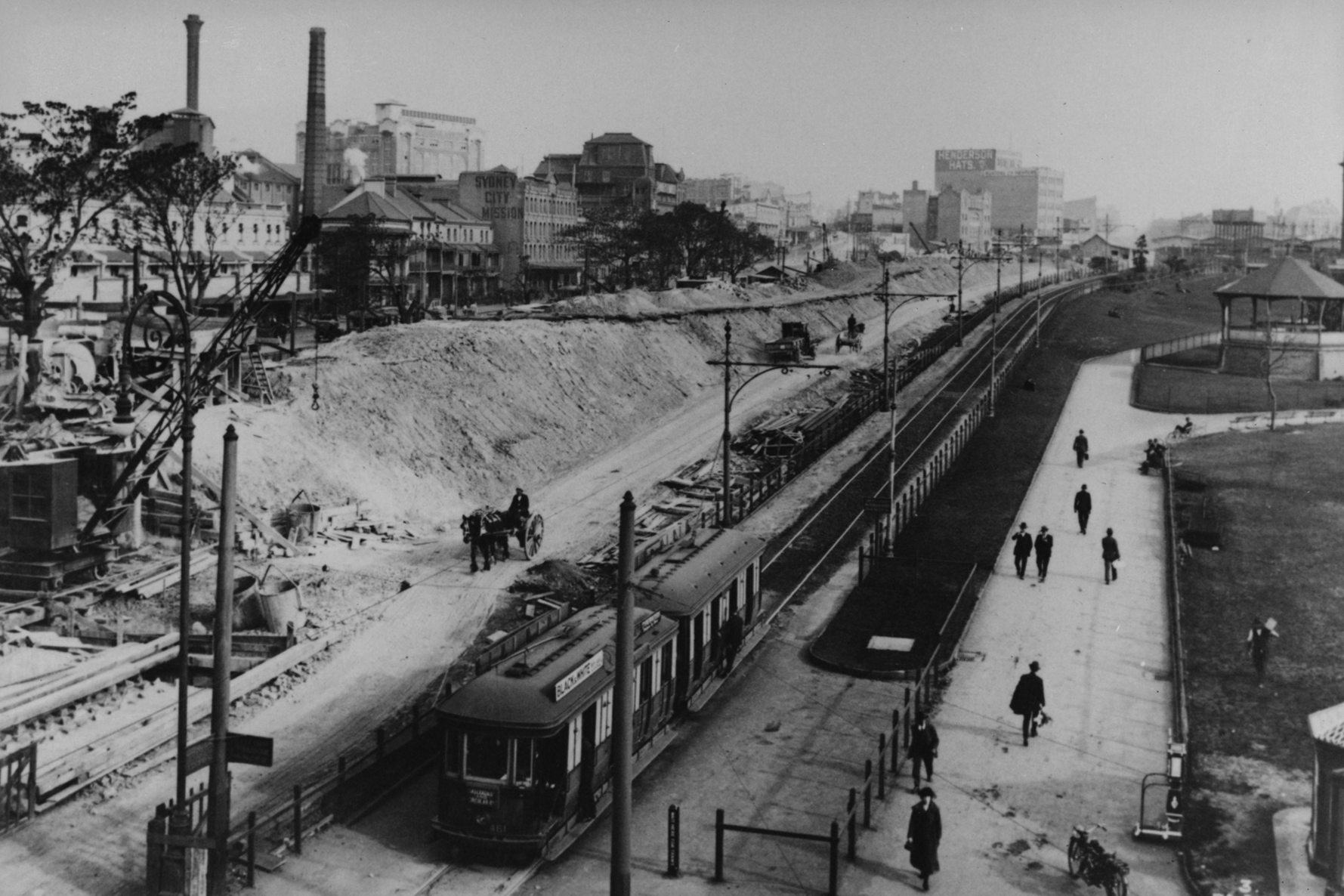
Belmore Park tram tracks, beside Elizabeth Street, Sydney, Haymarket, New South Wales, 1920

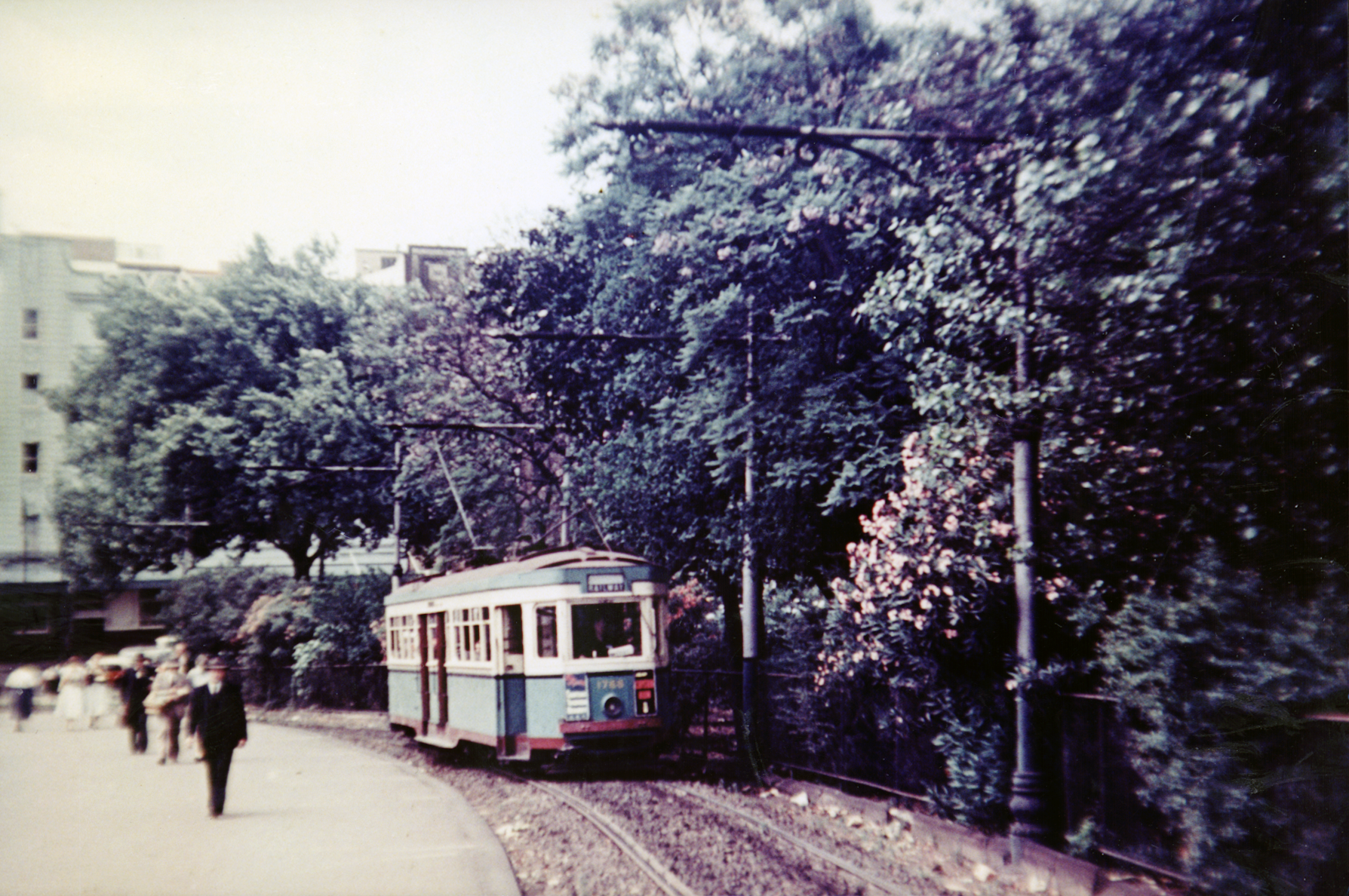
Tram in Belmore Park, 1955

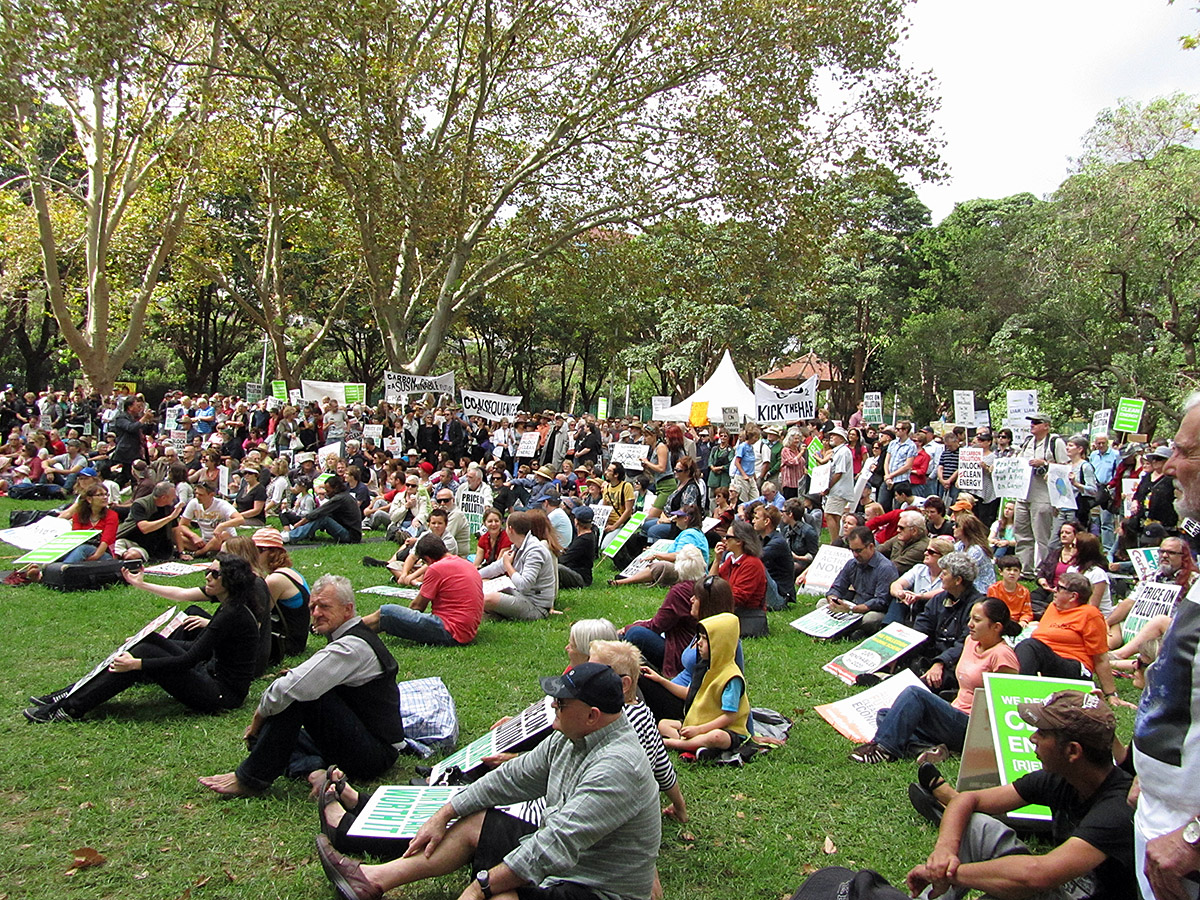
A climate change rally in the park, 2011

== See also ==
- List of parks in Sydney
