= Charles Nicholson Jewel Oliver =

Australian cricketer and public servant

Charles Nicholson Jewel Oliver CMG (24 April 1848 – 14 June 1920) was a first-class cricketer and public servant in Australia.

Born in Hobart, Van Diemen's Land, Oliver entered the New South Wales Civil Service, and was appointed Under-Secretary for Lands in November 1880. He then became one of the Commissioners of Railways under the new non-political system of control. In 1906 the Legislative council passed the Railway Commissioners Appointment Act, with the provision that it should not take effect until a new set of commissioners had been selected. So Oliver retired in April 1907 along with David Kirkcaldie and William Meeke Fehon, and the new Chief commissioner, Tom Richard Johnson, appointed. Kirkcaldie was appointed assistant commissioner for railways and Harry Richardson assistant commissioner for tramways.

Oliver played three games of cricket for New South Wales between 1865 and 1873. He was a member of the Sydney Cricket Ground Trust and chairman from 1898.

He died in 1920.

== See also ==
- List of New South Wales representative cricketers
