= Walter Conder =

General manager of the ABC 1933 to 1935

Walter Tasman Conder (18 October 1888 – 3 November 1974), frequently referred to as Major Conder, was general manager of the Australian Broadcasting Commission from 1933 to 1935.

== History ==
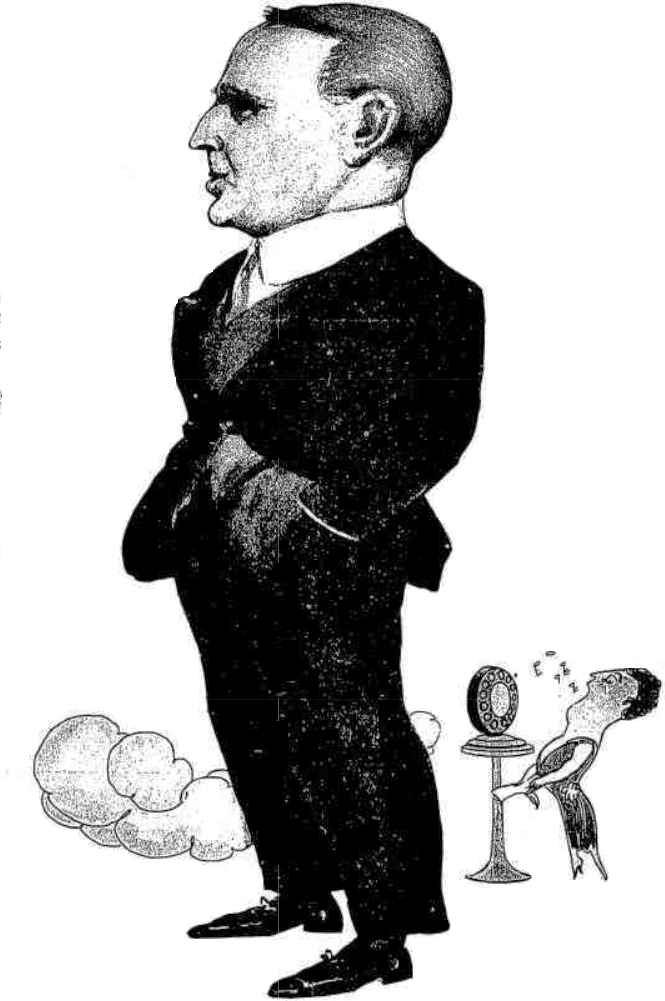
1926 caricature by Will Dyson

Conder was born in Ringarooma, Tasmania, a son of J. H. Conder, and educated at Church Grammar School, Launceston.

He was an officer with the Cadet Corps prior to WWI and when he enlisted with the First AIF in Melbourne he left for the Dardanelles as acting lieutenant with the 7th Battalion. He was wounded at Gallipoli and returned to Australia by the hospital ship Kyarra for six months' leave, then his appointment (with rank of captain) terminated in July 1916.

He re-enlisted during the second world war, giving his DOB as 18 October 1894 and his age as 45years 7 months. He served overseas for nearly two years as an amenities officer, with rank of major, then placed on the retired list in 1942.

He served out the war as controller of army training camps at Langwarrin and Broadmeadows, then was appointed governor of Pentridge prison, under the Victorian Prisons Department.

He became associated with J. C. Williamson, Ltd, and made general manager of Melbourne radio station 3LO, then in 1928 became managing director of Dominion Broadcasting Co., Ltd., which in May 1928 took over the assets of 3LO and 3AR. 7ZL (Hobart) was added in July and 5CL (Adelaide) shortly after. These stations were taken over by the Australian Government to form part of the National Broadcasting Network, under the Australian Broadcasting Commission (ABC).

In 1932 Conder was an organiser for the Melbourne Centenary.

He was appointed General Manager of the ABC, following the death of its charter GM, H. P. Williams. He immediately clashed with the Commission chairman, W. J. Cleary, who had a vision of the ABC as promoting quality arts and drama, while Conder wanted the service to have broad appeal. Conder resigned in June 1935 after Cleary alleged irregularities in Conder's use of ABC funds.

Charles Moses, the Commission's favored replacement, was appointed after being "groomed for the job" by Cleary. In February 1945 Cleary resigned from the Commission.

Conder left for Wellington, New Zealand in 1952. He died in Nelson in 1974.
