= Neal McCusker =

Commissioner of Railways in New South Wales 1956–1972

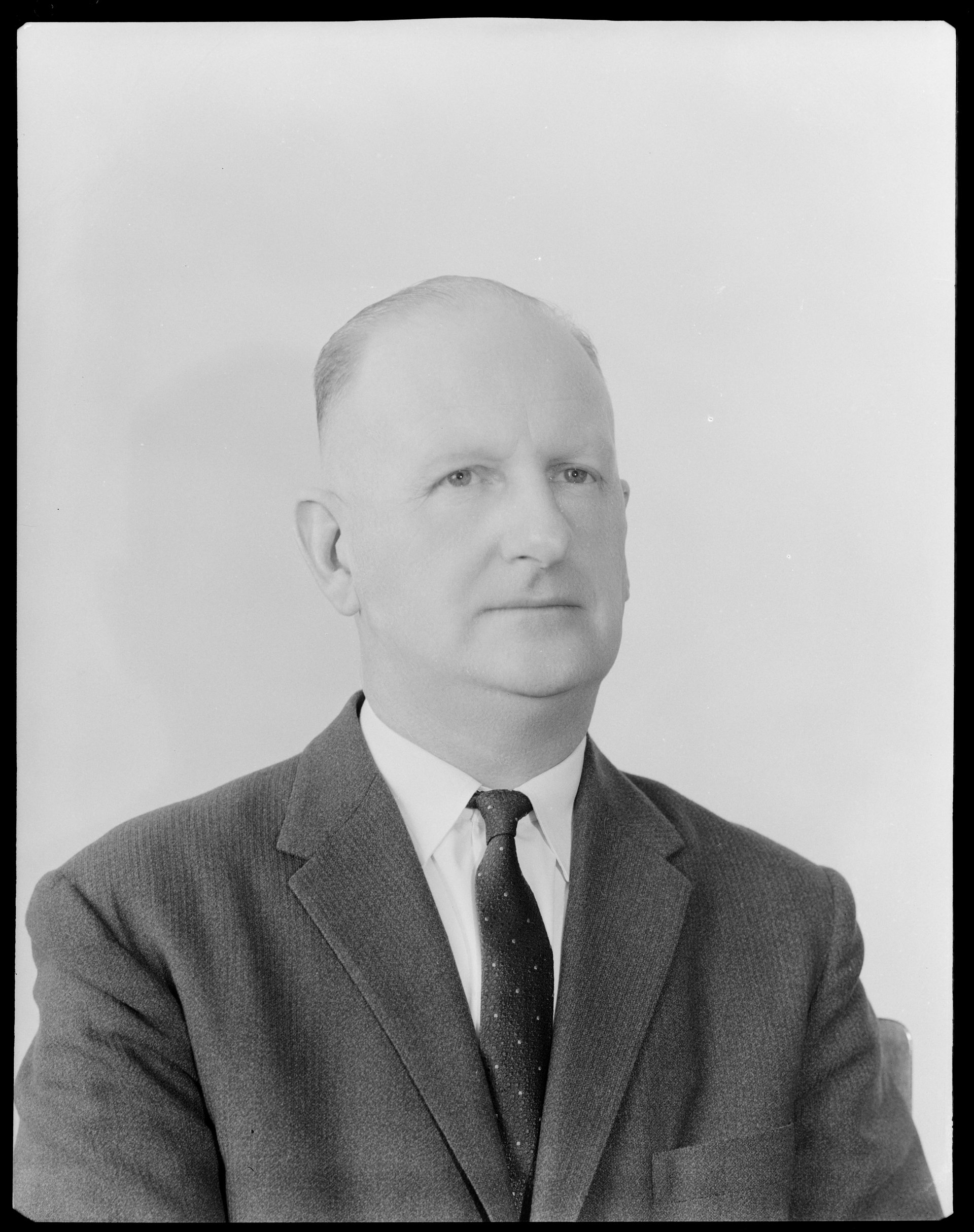
- McCusker in 1961

Personal details
- Born: 20 October 1907 Marrickville, Sydney
- Died: 27 July 1987 (aged 79 years) Mosman, Sydney, New South Wales, Australia
- Spouse(s): Mary Irene Magick, late 1932
- Children: 3

Neal McCusker CBE (20 October 1907 – 27 July 1987), often misspelled "Neil", was Commissioner of Railways in New South Wales 1956–1972.

== History ==
McCusker was born in Marrickville, Sydney, the only child of John Robert McCusker (c. 1850 – 11 October 1947) and his wife Emma McCusker, née Bird (c. 1868 – 13 October 1942), who married at Cootamundra on 7 November 1906.

He was educated at the Byrock public school, gaining QCs (Qualifying Certificates) in 1918 and 1919, then entered Dubbo High School where in 1922 he passed the Intermediate Certificate and joined the New South Wales Government Railways. Like Reg Winsor, McCusker was born into a railway family — his father was stationmaster at Cobar in 1928, in which year his son was promoted to Relieving Stationmaster at Byrock.

He continued studying part-time, in 1933 passing Advanced Accounting, and in 1935 Federal Income Tax, both exams conducted by the Commonwealth Institute of Accountants.

In 1954, while Winsor was taking three months' sick leave, State Cabinet appointed McCusker to act in his place as commissioner of the Department of Railways New South Wales, over two more senior officers: William Arthur Anderson (Secretary for Railways) and Allan James McAndrew (Assistant Secretary). This breach of public service norms was widely resented. McCusker died of heart failure at 79 years old. He was cremated.

== Conversion to diesel ==
The decision to switch from steam to diesel locomotives was made in 1956 and entirely implemented during McCusker's reign as Commissioner. Within ten years all of the Department of Railways New South Wales's main lines had been given over to diesel traction and facilities for steam working were retained on only a few lines: Gosford–Newcastle and Sydney–Goulburn and a few Dubbo branch lines, while the fleet of 1,164 steam locomotives in 1956 was down to 431 in 1966.

== Recognition ==
- McCusker was made Honorary Colonel of the Australian Engineer and Railway Staff Corps on 27 February 1957.
- He was made a CBE in 1959.
- In 1975 he was appointed chairman of the NSW Travel Agents' Registration Board.

== Family ==
McCusker married Mary Irene Magick on 9 November 1932. The couple had three children, two daughters and a son who died in infancy.
