= Charles Moses =

Australian public servant (1900–1988)

Sir Charles Moses CBE
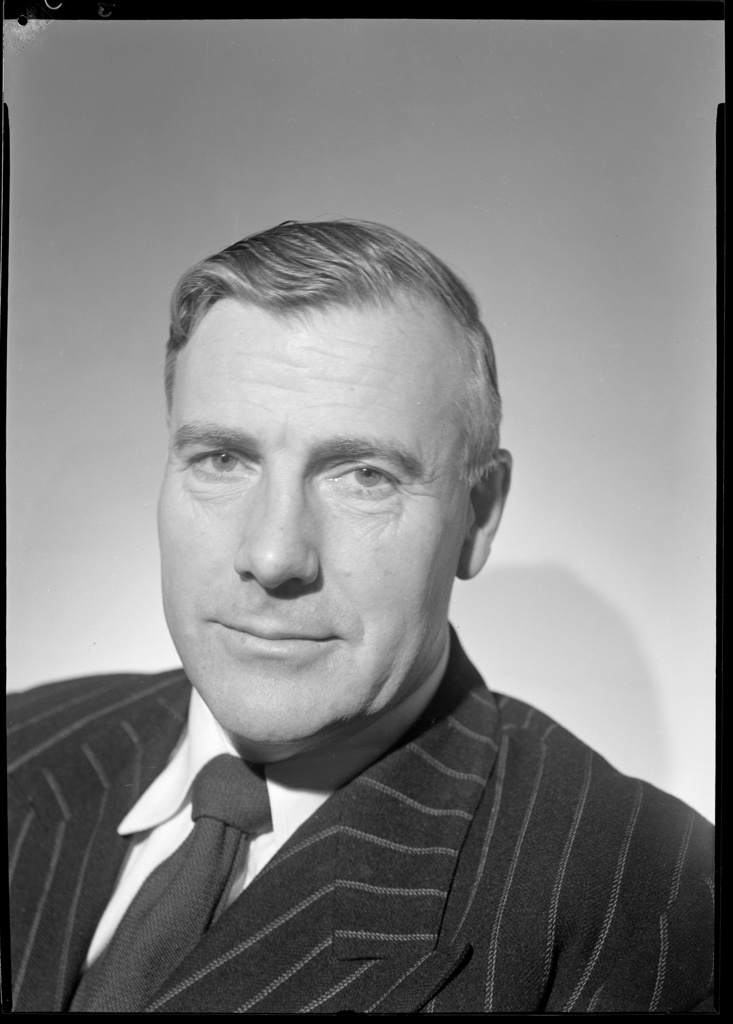
- Charles Moses, ABC, publicity portrait, Sydney, c. 1950

General manager of the Australian Broadcasting Commission
- In office 1935–1965
- Preceded by: Walter Conder
- Succeeded by: Sir Talbot Duckmanton

Personal details
- Born: Charles Joseph Alfred Moses; 21 January 1900 Westhoughton, Lancashire, England
- Died: 9 February 1988 (aged 88) Turramurra, New South Wales, Australia
- Spouse: Kathleen (Kitty) O'Sullivan (m. 1922–1988)
- Education: Royal Military College, Sandhurst
- Occupation: Network manager (ABC), Broadcaster
- Civilian awards: Commander of the Order of the British Empire (1954); Knight Bachelor (1961)

Military service
- Allegiance: Britain; Australia
- Years of service: British Army (1918–22); Australian Army (1940–43)
- Rank: Lieutenant colonel
- Commands: Port Moresby Base Sub Area; 2/7th Cavalry Regiment
- Battles/wars: Occupation of the Rhineland; Irish War of Independence; Second World War; Malayan campaign; Kokoda Track campaign; Battle of Buna-Gona; Rhine crossing
- Military awards: Mentioned in Despatches (1943)

Sir Charles Alfred Joseph Moses CBE (21 January 1900 – 9 February 1988) was a British-born Australian administrator who was general manager of the Australian Broadcasting Commission (ABC) from 1935 until 1965.

A 1918 graduate of the Royal Military College, Sandhurst, Moses served in the Occupation of the Rhineland and the Irish War of Independence. He emigrated to Australia in 1922. After a few years as a farmer and car salesman, he joined the ABC in 1930 as a radio sports announcer. During the Second World War he escaped from Singapore with Major General Gordon Bennett, led the 2/7th Cavalry Regiment at the Battle of Buna-Gona, and crossed the Rhine as a media executive accompanying the British Commandos.

After the war ended, the ABC created its own news organisation. It expanded its audience in rural areas through the new ABC Rural department with The Country Hour, and the iconic radio serial, Blue Hills. With the arrival of television in Australia in 1956, Moses oversaw the ABC's move to provide Australia's first national television service in time for the 1956 Olympic Games in Melbourne.

== Early life ==
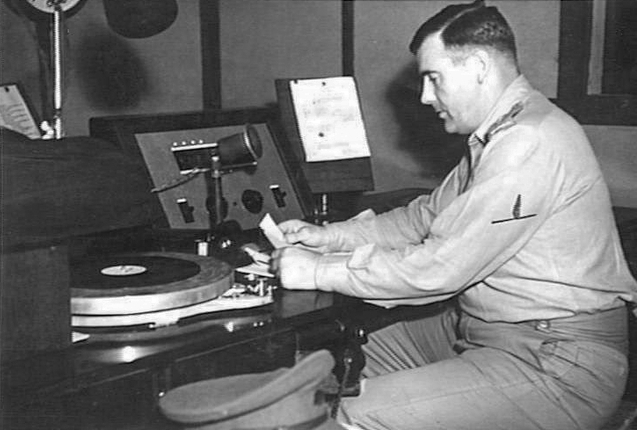
Charles Moses delivering his address from No.1 Studio, 9PA, during the station's opening ceremony

Charles Joseph Alfred Moses was born at Woodlands Farm in Westhoughton, Lancashire, England, on 21 January 1900, one of five children of Joseph Moses, a farmer, and his wife Elizabeth, née Henderson. In 1902, the family moved to Shropshire, where he was educated at Oswestry School, from which he graduated in 1912. He then entered the Royal Military College, Sandhurst, graduating in 1917. Shortly before the Armistice of 11 November 1918 that ended the Great War, he joined the 2nd Battalion, the Border Regiment, and served in the Occupation of the Rhineland. In 1919, the 2nd Battalion moved to Ireland, where the Irish War of Independence had broken out.

There, he fell in love with an Irish girl, Kathleen (Kitty) O'Sullivan of Castlebar in County Mayo. Courting her was dangerous; to see her he had to ride up to 30 kilometres (19 mi) on a bicycle along country roads controlled by the anti-British Irish Republican Army armed with a Webley Revolver. They were married in the Catholic Church at Aughrim Street in Dublin on 3 June 1922. They had a son, Tom, and a daughter, Kathleen.

Peacetime soldiering not being to his liking, Moses resigned his commission later that year; the newlyweds emigrated to Australia to join the rest of his family, who had emigrated in 1919. He used his payout from the British Army to buy the family farm in Bendigo, Victoria. Although he knew a great deal about cattle and sheep farming in England from having grown up on a farm there, tomato and citrus growing in Australia was quite different. The farm was not a success, and he lost all his money. He moved to Melbourne where he tried selling real estate, and worked as a physical training instructor. He also sold cars for six years before the onset of the Great Depression, when he found himself out of work.

Moses applied for a position as a radio announcer at the Australian Broadcasting Commission (ABC). His southern English accent was considered the ideal radio voice at the ABC at the time, and in 1930 he was invited to commentate on an ice hockey game. He was 6 feet (1.8 m) tall and weighed 17 stone (240 lb; 110 kg), and was noted for his prowess as an athlete. He had represented the state of Victoria in rugby union, was a champion discus-thrower, and had won the Victorian amateur heavyweight boxing championship in 1925. He had also played soccer, cricket and hockey while in the Army; but he had no knowledge of ice hockey. He read up on the sport and called the game. His broadcast was successful, and he was invited to join the ABC a week later, in August 1930.

Over the next few years, Moses became well known as a sport caster, calling the rugby and The Ashes matches of the Australian cricket team in England in 1934 from telegraphed despatches as if the commentary was live from the venue. He became the ABC's Sporting Editor in Sydney in January 1933, the Federal Controller of Talks in September 1934, the Federal Liaison Officer in August 1935, and finally, in November 1935, the general manager. His predecessor, Walter Conder, had been in conflict with the chairman of the ABC, William James Cleary. Conder had wanted to give the listeners what he thought they wanted: sports and entertainment; Cleary wanted to give them what he thought they should have: discussion and high culture. Inevitably, Cleary won the argument.

Cleary and Moses fostered Australian talent and promoted original content, but they also brought out overseas artists like Elisabeth Rethberg, Ezio Pinza, Malcolm Sargent, Lotte Lehman, and Arthur Rubinstein. Concert organisers charged that the ABC had no right to break monopolies by producing its own concerts. A compromise was reached, whereby the ABC was permitted to broadcast any concert for which admission was charged. Access to news produced a similar problem, with the ABC confronting Keith Murdoch's powerful News Limited, which had great influence over conservative politicians like Joseph Lyons and Robert Menzies. Without its own news-gathering organisation, the ABC was dependent on News Limited. When war broke out in September 1939, Moses decided to broadcast the news independent of News Limited. Menzies refused to back the ABC.

== Second World War ==
Moses volunteered for service with the Second Australian Imperial Force (AIF) on 13 May 1940, and was given the AIF service number NX12404. A lieutenant in the British Army Reserve of Officers, he was commissioned in the AIF as a lieutenant on 17 May 1940. He was promoted to captain on 1 July, and was posted to the 2/20th Battalion as a company commander. On 3 February 1941, he embarked for Singapore on the ocean liner RMS Queen Mary. He was promoted to major on 24 August 1941, and on 30 August joined the staff of AIF Malaya, under Major General Gordon Bennett.

As liaison officer to the 11th Indian Division, Moses twice narrowly escaped ambushes. On 11 February 1942, he had a conversation with Bennett's aide, Lieutenant G. H. Walker, in which he expressed a desire to escape if Singapore fell, as seemed likely at that point. Five days later, Moses, Bennett and Walker escaped from Singapore in a sampan, and made their way to Sumatra. They crossed Sumatra to Padang, on its west coast, from whence they flew to Java. In Batavia, Moses was knocked down by a taxi, fracturing his ribs. He was diagnosed with scrub typhus, and placed on the dangerously ill list. He was evacuated by a Dutch freighter and taken to Perth where he was hospitalised at the 110th and 113th General Hospitals. After the war he strongly supported Bennett's decision to escape from Singapore.

On 9 October 1942, he was appointed commander of the Port Moresby Base Area, then engaged in support of the Kokoda campaign, with the rank of lieutenant colonel. Not satisfied with an administrative post, he personally lobbied the commander of Allied Land Forces, General Sir Thomas Blamey, and the Minister for the Army, Frank Forde, for an active command, demonstrating his fitness by running up an 800-metre (2,600 ft) hill. On 27 December he assumed command of the 2/7th Cavalry Regiment, which he led in the bitter Battle of Buna-Gona, fighting as infantry. In February 1943, he was evacuated to the 2/5th General Hospital in Port Moresby with malaria. On 12 April 1943, he relinquished command of the 2/7th Cavalry Regiment, and was placed on the Australian Reserve of Officers. For his services, he was mentioned in despatches on 10 August 1943.

== Later life ==
While he was in hospital recovering from malaria, Moses received a personal letter from the Prime Minister of Australia, John Curtin. His Australian Labor Party had always been treated roughly by the newspapers, particularly the Murdoch press, and when it had come to power in 1941, it had instructed the ABC to ignore its agreements with the news agencies, and to gather its own news. Curtin feared that unless Moses was at the helm, the ABC would revert to sourcing all its news from the agencies. Moreover, Curtin wanted the ABC to develop a sense of national identity, and to provide the workers and service personnel with more entertainment. This last task inevitably set Moses up for a clash with Cleary, but now it was the general manager who held the cards, and Cleary resigned on 30 March 1945.

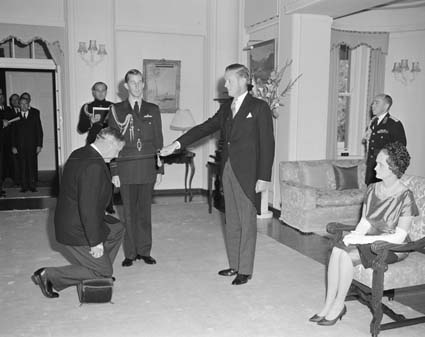
Investiture of Sir Charles Moses by the Governor General of Australia, Viscount De L'Isle

In February 1945, Moses attended the Empire Broadcasting Conference in London, and was invited to see how the war in Europe was being reported by the BBC. He observed the crossing of the Rhine by Field Marshal Bernard Montgomery's forces, and crossed the Rhine River with the British Commandos. He was awarded the France and Germany Star.

After the war ended, the Australian Broadcasting Act (1946) charged the ABC with responsibility for gathering its own news. The ABC expanded its audience in rural areas with the new ABC Rural. The Country Hour, which began in 1945, did surprisingly well even in city areas. The ABC followed it up with The Land and its People, a series of documentaries, and the iconic radio serial, Blue Hills in 1949. Moses did not neglect high culture; in 1945 he reached an agreement with the Sydney City Council to create an ABC orchestra. Soon there were ABC orchestras in all the state capitals.

A major change was the introduction of television in 1956. The Labor Party had, in June 1949, pledged to introduce television into Australia as soon as possible, but it had lost office later that year, and the Liberal Menzies government was opposed to television, which Menzies hoped would never come to Australia. Nonetheless, he was unable to stem the tide of public opinion, and the Broadcasting and Television Act (1956) allowed for television in Australia just in time for the 1956 Olympic Games in Melbourne. The addition of television caused a spurt of growth at the ABC, as staff numbers grew from 2,000 in 1956 to 3,000 in 1960, while the budget doubled from £3.7 million to £7.4 million.

By the late 1950s, Moses' good relations with the politicians were a thing of the past. In October 1957, the Deputy Leader of the Opposition, Arthur Calwell, launched a vitriolic attack on Moses over his appointment of Peter Homfray, an Englishman and an unsuccessful Liberal Party candidate for the Parliament of Tasmania, as director of Radio Australia, an appointment that Moses had deliberately made when the Australian Parliament was in recess. In 1963, Menzies ordered Moses not to broadcast a BBC interview with Georges Bidault, the former Prime Minister of France, who was living in exile after conspiring against the government of Charles de Gaulle. Moses sent copies of the video to commercial stations, and it was broadcast by the Nine Network in Sydney and the Seven Network in Melbourne.

Moses retired in 1965 and was succeeded as head of the ABC by Sir Talbot Duckmanton. When Moses had taken charge in 1935, he had less than 300 people and just 14 radio stations. Duckmanton inherited an ABC with 83 radio stations, 24 television stations and a staff of 5,000. Moses was made a Commander of the Order of British Empire in the 1954 Birthday Honours, and was knighted in the 1961 Birthday Honours. From 1965 to 1977, he served as the first Secretary-General of the Asian Broadcasting Union (now known as the Asia-Pacific Broadcasting Union), a non-profit professional association of broadcasters. He published a book on it, Diverse Unity: The Asian-Pacific Broadcasting Union, 1957–1977 in 1978. He became a foundation member of the Australian Elizabethan Theatre Trust in 1954, and helped with the design competition for the Sydney Opera House, becoming a foundation member of the Sydney Opera House Trust in 1961. In 1969, he became vice president of the Royal Agricultural Society of New South Wales.

== Death and legacy ==
Moses died at Turramurra in Sydney on 9 February 1988, and his remains were cremated. He had a son named Tom; his daughter Kathleen had died in 1960. The Charles Moses Stadium at the Sydney Showground at Sydney Olympic Park was named in his honour.

== Notes ==
Media offices
Preceded by Walter Conder	General manager, Australian Broadcasting Commission; 1935–1965	Succeeded by Sir Talbot Duckmanton
