= Roger Hartigan =

Australian cricketer

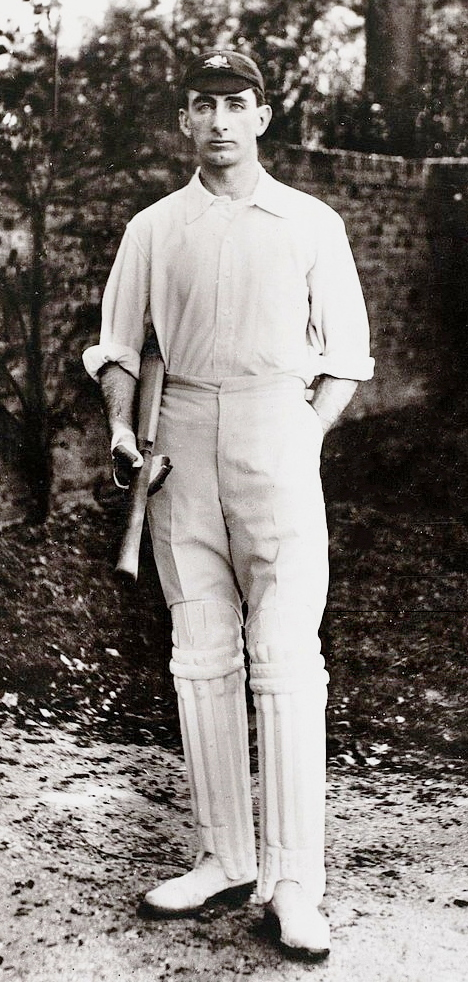
- Hartigan pictured in about 1909

Personal information
- Born: 12 December 1879; Chatswood, New South Wales, Australia
- Died: 7 June 1958 (aged 78); Brisbane, Queensland, Australia
- Batting: Right-handed
- Bowling: Right-arm

International information
- National side: Australia
- Test debut (cap 92): 10 January 1908 v England
- Last Test: 21 February 1908 v England

Career statistics
Competition	Test	First-class
Matches	2	45
Runs scored	170	1,901
Batting average	42.50	25.01
100s/50s	1/0	2/14
Top score	116	116
Balls bowled	12	592
Wickets	0	9
Bowling average	–	40.11
5 wickets in innings	–	0
10 wickets in match	–	0
Best bowling	–	3/27
Catches/stumpings	1/–	36/–
- Source: Cricinfo, 13 October 2022

Michael Joseph "Roger" Hartigan (12 December 1879 – 7 June 1958) was an Australian cricketer and administrator.

Hartigan became Australia's 92nd Test debutant on 10 January 1908 for the Third Test of the 1907–08 Test series against England. Batting at number eight in the second innings, Hartigan (scoring 116) added 243 runs for the eighth wicket – still an Australian Test cricket record – with Clem Hill (160) in oppressive heat at Adelaide Oval.

Missing the Fourth Test through business commitments, Hartigan returned for the Fifth Test of the 1907/08 season six weeks later in Sydney scoring just 1 and 5. Although selected to play in the 1909 Ashes series in England, Hartigan performed poorly in the warm-up matches and never played Test Cricket again.

After his retirement from first-class cricket in 1921, Hartigan served on the Board of Cricket Control – forerunner of today's Cricket Australia – for 35 years, and was also chairman of the Brisbane Cricket Ground Trust. Hartigan, along with John Hutcheon, was given the credit for securing Brisbane's first ever Test Match in 1928. The match turned out to be a disaster for Australia losing by 675 runs but it did see the debut of Don Bradman for the home team.

In addition to cricket, Hartigan also represented New South Wales and Queensland in baseball, playing in Queensland's first recorded inter-state baseball series against New South Wales at the Brisbane Exhibition Ground. He also represented Queensland in lacrosse.

Hartigan died in 1958 and was buried in Brisbane's Toowong Cemetery.

His brother Thomas J. Hartigan was Chief Commissioner for Railways in New South Wales 1932–48.
