= John Harper (administrator) =

Australian railway administrator (1851 – 1932)

John Harper (1851 – 1 July 1932) was a railways administrator. He served as Chief Commissioner of New South Wales Railways from 1914 to 1917.

== History ==
Caricatures by David Low

Harper was born in Parramatta and educated at Newington College and King's School. He spent several years in literary employment, then in 1871 started with the Railways as a clerk in John Whitton's office. In 1877 he was appointed clerk supervising goods staff at Redfern railway station. In 1887 he succeeded G. T. Evans as goods superintendent, then in 1897 he succeeded David Kirkcaldie as Chief Traffic Manager, then following the death of Kirkcaldie was promoted to Assistant Commissioner for Railways.

Harper was Acting Commissioner while T. R. Johnson was on three months' leave from April 1910, then was elevated to the substantive position when Johnson retired in 1914.

Harper was not in robust health, however. He was obliged to take leave, and at its expiry he tendered his resignation. The post of Chief Commissioner was then filled by James Fraser, who had been acting during Harper's absence.

Harper died at his home at 29 Prince Albert Street, Mosman. His remains were buried at Rookwood Cemetery.

== Personal ==
Harper married Sarah (c. 1853 – c. 10 October 1929) Their children include:

- Walter Harper
- Ethel Mary Harper (born 27 March 1875) married Stanley Macleay Rudder (also rendered "Rutter") of "St Elmo", Mudgee, on 26 March 1904
- Emily Harper married L. J. Berkelman
