= Thomas J. Hartigan =

Australian cricketer

Personal information
- Full name: Thomas Joseph Hartigan
- Born: 8 December 1878 [dubious—see note] Sydney, Australia
- Died: 2 May 1963 (aged 84); Sydney, Australia
- Source: ESPNcricinfo, 31 December 2016

Thomas Joseph Hartigan C.M.G. (8 December 1877 or 8 December 1878 – 2 May 1963), (Note: The year 1877 is supported by the assertion that Hartigan was aged 55 in December 1932.) was a railways clerk who became Chief Railways Commissioner in New South Wales. He was a keen cricketer, playing one first-class match for New South Wales in 1907/08.

== History ==
Hartigan was born in Woolloomooloo or Muswellbrook,

He joined the railway service as a junior clerk in 1892 and became assistant chief accountant in 1917, chief accountant in 1820. and controller of accounts and audit in 1921.

In 1929 he toured Europe and America investigating railway matters.

He had a disagreement with W. J. Cleary, which may have helped his relations with Lang. He was appointed to the Transport Commission (finance branch) in 1932.

He became Commissioner for Railways on 29 December 1932, succeeding William James Cleary, who resigned after surviving a feud with Premier Jack Lang. After five years he was pleased to announce that the Railways had made a profit of £28,000, modest enough, but a welcome change from deficits in the millions.

He was a popular official, with a ready smile and archetypical Irish flattery — blarney — and a politician's memory for names and faces. He was even popular with the unions, but that didn't arrest the wave of strikes in the late 1930s and late 1940s. He was forced to retire in October 1948, to be replaced by his assistant, F. C. Garside.

== Other interests ==
Hartigan was a keen cricketer: a useful bowler and secretary of the Gordon Cricket Club, which he founded. His brother Roger Hartigan was a Test cricketer.

== Family ==
Hartigan married Imelda Josephine Boylson on 26 March 1908. They had two sons and two daughters:

- Geoffrey Thomas Hartigan married Kathleen McBride on 20 June 1940 They had twin daughters a year later.
- John Hartigan married Olga Ferguson on 3 January 1941.
- Joan Marcia Hartigan (born c. 1913) married Hugh Moxon Bathurst on 4 May 1946 Joan was a champion tennis player.
- Gwen Hartigan married rugby union player Eric Excell Ford on 4 February 1937.

They had a home at 58 Moruben Road, Mosman.

He was not closely related to Monsignor Patrick Joseph Hartigan, better known as John O'Brien, author of Around the Boree Log.

== See also ==
- List of New South Wales representative cricketers
