= William James Cleary =

Australian railway commissioner (1885–1973)

William James Cleary (29 December 1885 – 20 July 1973) was an Australian brewery executive who was recruited by the New South Wales government to take the position of Commissioner of the railways during the Great Depression. He was later chairman of the Australian Broadcasting Commission.

== History ==
Cleary was born in Redfern, New South Wales, son of Thomas Patrick Cleary (1861 – 27 April 1946) and Elsie Petrie Cleary, née Rose (c. 1860 – 9 December 1940). who married in 1880. He was educated at Blackfriars Primary School, where he won a scholarship to enter Sydney Boys' High School.

=== Business and academia ===
He left school at age 14 and began working at his father's workplace, Tooth's Kent Brewery, in his spare time studying economics at Sydney University, where he was awarded a bachelor's degree in 1918. He made a series of reforms at Tooth's, and was rewarded with rapid promotions, becoming assistant manager in 1920.

He started lecturing at Diploma of Economics tutorial classes, and from around 1923 lectured on business principles in the Faculty of Economics as successor to Sir Henry Braddon.

By December 1923 he was general manager of the brewery.

=== Railways ===
The Government of New South Wales was for some years perturbed at the losses being increasingly incurred by the railways as motor vehicles took much of their traffic, and the idea took hold that management of the network should be a financial rather than engineering position. On 8 November 1929, Premier Bavin announced that the remainder of James Fraser's contract, plus another seven years, had been offered to Cleary at the statutory salary of £5,000 p.a., substantially less than he received at Tooth's. The railways had been progressively losing money and Bavin considered an outsider would be more likely to make hard decisions that would ultimately benefit the State. Cleary explained his acceptance of the position as giving something back to the State, but the true reason could be that he found success boring, and he enjoyed a challenge more than simply making money. He left Tooth and Co. in November 1929 and moved into the Chief Commissioner's office on 1 December.

Cleary called a meeting to discuss his proposal to reduce the workforce by 1000 men and return to a 48-hour week. He won over the unions with the necessity for self-sacrifice; for his part, electing to halve his salary by passing £2,000 to the unions to help alleviate individual cases of exceptional suffering, and £500 to the Railways as his contribution to reining in the deficit. A year later, despite sackings and longer working hours, the Railways' deficit had more than doubled. Apologists for Cleary say he kept the railways running through the worst years of the Depression.

Bavin was ousted by Jack Lang's Labor Party at the November 1930 elections. One of his first acts was to create the new position of Commissioner for Transport, salary £1,800 p.a., to be responsible for Railways, Tramways, Main Roads, and Vehicular Traffic, replacing the Commissioners. To that end, he requested from Cleary the services of Charles Joachim Goode, (Note: After the enquiry, at which Goode was found to have acted corruptly, he left the railways and became publican of the Hotel Alexandria, Leura. In July 1939 he took over the Milsons Point Hotel licence. Little more has been found. His wife Lilian died in 1952 and Goode followed in 1959.) a Labor man with wide railway experience, to help formulate new legislation. Cleary refused to release him, on the grounds that Goode was the subject of an ongoing inquiry. Lang retaliated by sidelining Cleary and his Commissioners O. W. Brain and A. D. J. Forster. In 1930 Lang pushed through an amendment to the Industrial Arbitration (Eight Hours) Act, which came into effect in January 1931, giving him the power to "ration" (i.e. stand down without cause and without pay) any member of any corporate body (including Cleary and his assistants) for any period. It did not however prevent them from continuing to exercise their powers. Cleary sacked Goode in February 1931, and later that year Lang appointed Goode to the new post.

Lang was dismissed by NSW Governor Sir Philip Game on 16 May 1932, and within weeks a Royal Commission was established to consider the Goode affair. The Royal Commission, at which Cleary gave evidence, found Goode had engaged in corrupt practices. Goode resigned as Chief Transport Commissioner on 23 July 1932 and was replaced by Cleary, with a salary of £3500 p.a., on 3 August 1932, He resigned in December 1932 "for private reasons", or as Smith's Weekly had it, "for the Service' good" — Cleary had lost the trust of his subordinates, notably in his addresses to several women's groups, which could easily be taken for disloyalty. T. J. Hartigan succeeded him as Chief Commissioner of Railways on 1 January 1933.

== Broadcasting ==
In June 1934 Charles Lloyd Jones, foundation chairman of the Australian Broadcasting Commission, resigned to concentrate on his business interests, and in July Cleary was announced as his successor, with a three-year contract and an annual salary of £500.

Cleary read widely, and had a cultivated taste in music. He saw the ABC's future in fostering Australian culture, where General Manager W. T. Conder, wanted the network to have broader appeal. However this hardly explains the implacable enmity between the two men, which led, according to one biographer but not reported at the time, to Cleary reporting Conder for some financial irregularity, after which, in June 1935, Conder resigned. The secretary, A. L. Holman, acted as general manager briefly. Suggestions that the positions of General Manager and Chairman of the ABC should be combined (in Cleary) were scotched by Cleary who was, however, quietly preparing Charles Moses for the position, announced 4 November 1935.

He resigned abruptly in February 1945, having succumbed to the feeling or realization that his subordinates were plotting against him.

== Family ==
Cleary married Melanie Newton Lewis (5 July 1880 – 20 April 1966) on 20 April 1912. She was a daughter of accountant John Newton Lewis (died 22 September 1909). Their children include

- Joan Lewis Cleary (20 May 1913 – October 1989) was a commercial artist. She married Stafford Garland Crossman on 13 May 1939.
- Ruth Petrie Cleary (born 9 May 1914) educated at Abbotsleigh
- Betty Newton Cleary (born 20 November 1917) educated at Queenwood, Mosman, married Hereward "Herrie" Brudenell-Woods of Mona Vale on 1 March 1941
- Millicent "Babs" Cleary (no DoB found) was educated at Queenwood, Mosman. She was engaged to Victor Clarke R.A.N.V.R. in 1942, but no record of marriage has been found.
- Pauline Cleary (born 1923) was educated at Abbotsleigh, Scots College, and Queenwood

In 1916 they were living at 14 Leicester Street, Marrickville, later Awaba Street, Edwards Beach, Mosman.

Cleary's brother, Roy Victor Cleary (c. 1900 – c. 15 June 1928), was advertising manager for the Ford Motor Co. of Australia.
