= Robert Lucas Nash =

Journalist and writer (1846–1920)

Robert Lucas Nash (June 1846 – 26 February 1920), commonly referred to as R. L. Nash, was a journalist and writer on economics and financial subjects in Australia.

== History ==
Nash was born in Bristol, England, and educated at the Bristol Grammar School.

He was from 1864 a regular contributor to The Economist magazine and managing editor of the British Australasian, from which he retired to become economics editor of the Sydney Daily Telegraph, the first such appointment in Australia. He arrived in Sydney by the R.M.S. Himalaya in February 1893.

His advice was sought by George Dibbs during the depression of the 1890s, and subsequently by premiers of the various States, and by the Federal Convention when framing the Constitution.

He died suddenly and his remains buried at Waverley Cemetery.

== Publications ==
Nash was the author of "The Australasian Joint Stock Companies' Year Book", "Investors' Sinking Fund and Redemption Tables", a popular reference work, "The Profitable Nature of Our Investments", and "Fenn on the Funds", an annual survey of the indebtedness of various countries, which grew exponentially in the 1870s as a result of various wars — the American Civil War, the Paraguayan War, the Austro-German War, and the Franco-German War. He also compiled the annual "Australasian Joint Stock Companies' Year Book".

== Personal ==
Nash married Alice Mary Ellen Nash (died 3 July 1933) in September 1870. Their children include

- Valentine Clifford Nash (died 6 July 1953), bank manager at Guyra
- Felix Lionel Ernest Nash (died 8 October 1950), of the Sydney Harbour Trust
- Frank Thompson Nash, journalist, married Ada Keith Collins on 17 November 1906.
- Lillian Nash
- Dorothy Marion Nash married Harry Watson McKeown on 23 September 1914

In later years they had a home, "Lochwinnoch", 21 Bradley's Head Road, Mosman.
