= David Kirkcaldie =

David Kirkcaldie (December 1848 – 5 September 1909) was a Scots-born railway executive in New South Wales.

== History ==
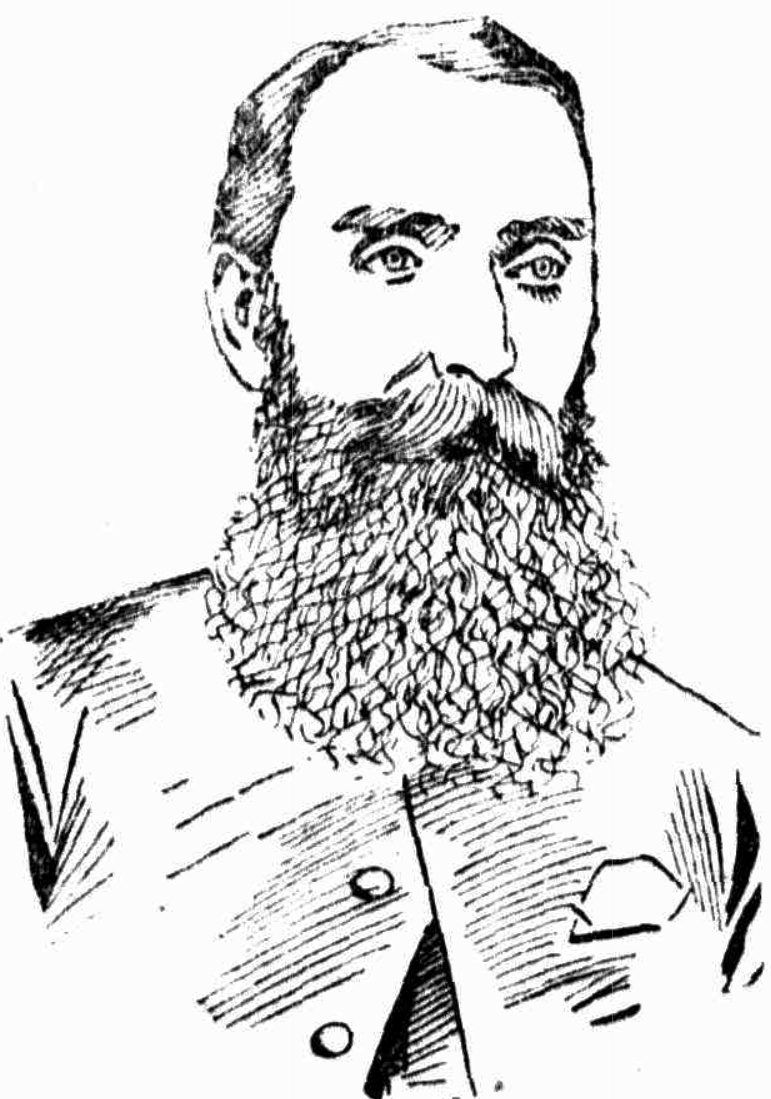
David Kirkcaldie

Kirkcaldie was born near Leven, or Kirkcaldy, in Fifeshire Scotland. At age 13 he entered the service of the North British Railway Company, or Leven and East of Fife Railway, and remained in that service for 15 years. He had the opportunity for promotion to the Great Indian Peninsula Railway, Bombay (present-day Mumbai), but was afraid the weather would not be healthy for him, so instead emigrated to Australia, joining the New South Wales Railway service in 1876 as a clerk in the office of the Chief Traffic Manager for the Western and Southern lines. Three years later he was promoted to chief clerk in that section, then assistant traffic manager for the Southern and Western lines under William Vero Read (died 1922). In 1889 the office was made redundant by the opening of a bridge over the Hawkesbury River; Read was made Railways Secretary in place of Donald Vernon (1839–1891), and Kirkcaldie was promoted to Chief Traffic Manager. He was appointed one of two Railway Commissioners (the other being W. M. Fehon) under Chief Commissioner C. N. J. Oliver in 1897. In 1901 both Fehon and Kirkcaldie were offered the position of Chief Commissioner of Victorian Railways, and extracted from Parliament a £500 pay rise from £1500 to £2000 p.a. to keep them in NSW. Tense relations between Oliver and Kirkcaldie led to a royal commission, resulting in the three-commissioner system being replaced by two commissioners, with Kirkcaldie (at £1500) as assistant to Tom Richard Johnson.

He died following an operation for appendicitis, and his remains were buried at St Thomas' Anglican Church, Enfield, New South Wales.

== Family ==
Kirkcaldie married Alice Angela Mountain (died 29 September 1933) on 8 June 1884; they had three daughters.

- Katherine Vida Kirkcaldie (born 2 June 1885) was Army nurse during WWI
- Rosa Angela Kirkcaldie (born 3 June 1887 – 4 August 1892) also Army nurse during WWI
- Grace Dymphna Kirkcaldie (28 December 1888 – 3 March 1979) married Alec D. Ellis in London on 20 August 1918

They had a home "Teryawynia", Bridge Street, Homebush
