= Tom Richard Johnson =

Australian railway executive (c. 1850–1935)

Tom Richard Johnson (c. 1850 – 9 January 1935) was a railway executive in Australia, Chief Commissioner for Railways in New South Wales from 1907 to 1914.

== History ==
Johnson was a native of Great Britain.

He joined the Great Northern Railway in 1872 and became district engineer in 1890 and assistant engineer in the company's way and works and construction branch in 1900. After a selection process, he was invited to take up a seven-year appointment as Chief Commissioner for Railways and Tramways, New South Wales.

In March 1907 he left for Australia, to take up the position, with David Kirkcaldie as Assistant Commissioner for Railways, and Harry Richardson as Assistant Commissioner for Tramways.

In 1908 Johnson addressed striking tramway workers, with such effect that they returned to work.

He retired in 1914, replaced by John Harper. In 1917 he was called on by the Victorian Railways to advise on the means of upgrading its business practices.

He was mentioned as possible successor to Henry Deane as Engineer-in-chief of Commonwealth Railways in 1914.

== Personal ==
He married Ada Marion Thornett in London c. 23 August 1914.

== Other interests ==
He was a director of the

- Bank of Australasia
- Australian Agricultural Company
- Peel River Land and Mineral Company
