= James Fraser (railways administrator) =

Australian railway engineer and railway chief commissioner (1861 – 1936)

James Fraser C.M.G., M.Inst. C.E. (20 August 1861 – 28 July 1936) was an Australian-born Chief Commissioner of New South Wales railways from 1917 to 1929. He has been credited with inauguration of Sydney's railway electrification.

== History ==
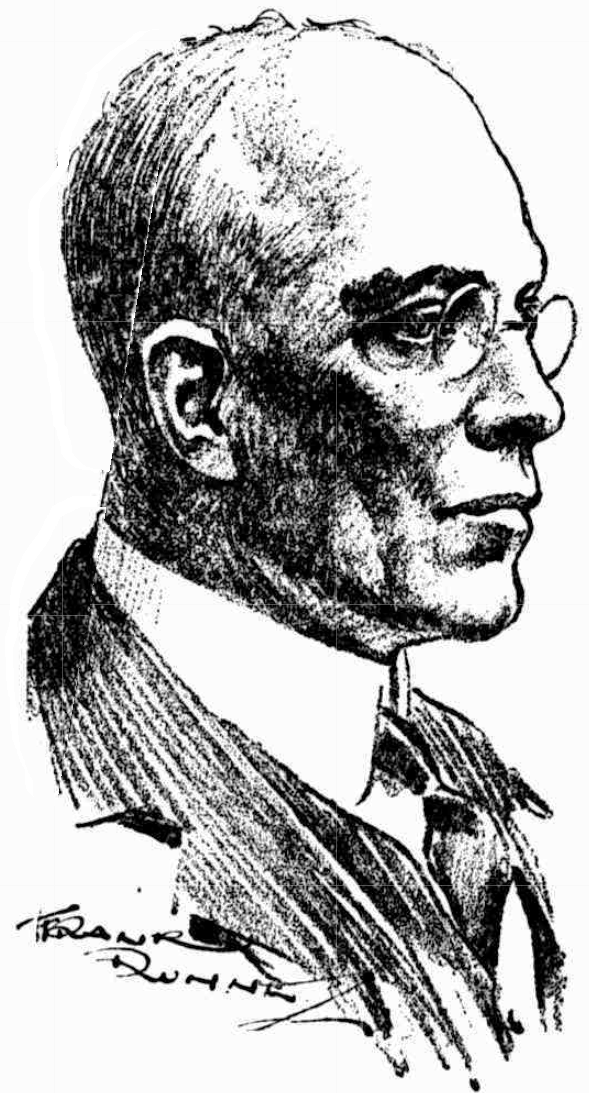
James Fraser

Fraser was born in Braidwood, New South Wales, and educated at Sydney Grammar School.

He joined the railways as a cadet draftsman or civil engineer, and in 1903 succeeded Thomas Rhodes Firth, his father-in-law, as engineer-in-chief for existing lines.

In 1914 he was appointed Assistant Commissioner, and in 1917 became Chief Commissioner, in place of Harper, who was in poor health. The role of Assistant Commissioner was restored:

- Edward Milne, Assistant Commissioner, traffic
- John Henry Cann, Assistant Commissioner, construction
- Henry Fox, Assistant Commissioner, staff matters

He resigned in 1929 and was succeeded by W. J. Cleary.

1931 he was appointed to the Transport Coordination Board, which was dissolved in 1932 after the collapse of the Lang Government.

He died at his home "Arnprior", Avon Road, Pymble, at the age of 74 after a year suffering from tuberculosis.

== Family ==
Fraser married Maria Elizabeth "Bessie" Firth (c. 1866 – 30 August 1929) on 11 November 1891. They had four sons:

- Keith Aird Fraser (9 January 1893 – 23 August 1952) was born at "Burenda", Wycombe-road, Neutral Bay. He adopted a railways career, became Commissioner of Railways in 1952 but died the same year.
- James Firth Fraser (21 September 1896 – 26 August 1927) Son served overseas in WWI and completed his medical degree, but died from tuberculosis shortly after.
- Noel Fraser (6 February 1903 – ) born at "Arnprior", Neutral Bay
- Ian Fraser (7 October 1911 – )

== Other interests ==
Fraser was known to play the occasional game of bridge.
