= Allied logistics in the Kokoda Track campaign =

Part of the New Guinea Campaign of WW2

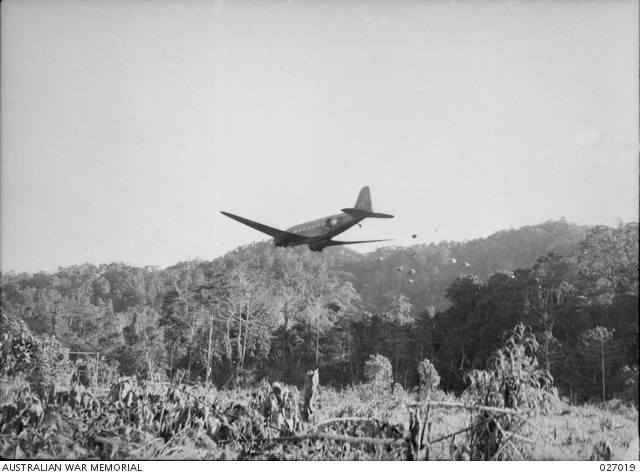
A US C-47 transport plane dropping supplies to the Australian 25th Infantry Brigade near Nauro Village in October 1942

During the Second World War, Allied logistics in Papua played a crucial role in bringing the Kokoda Track campaign to a successful conclusion. "The great problem of warfare in the Pacific", General Douglas MacArthur declared, "is to move forces into contact and maintain them. Victory is dependent upon solution to the logistic problem."

Although identified early as a vital strategic outpost, Port Moresby, the most significant Papuan town, had just two airfields and basic port facilities in early 1942. An enormous amount of work was required to transform it into a major base for both air and land operations against the Japanese. This was done in the face of frequent Japanese air raids. During the course of the Kokoda Track campaign, the two original airfields were improved, and five new airfields were developed. To make them operational, the engineers had to construct more than just runways; taxiways, hardstands, facilities and access roads all had to be built. The operation of the base depended on shipping, but the port facilities were limited. To increase the capacity of the port, a causeway was built to Tatana Island, where pontoon docks were emplaced. Engineers also built roads, warehouses, and a water treatment plant. They ran the town's electricity and water supply, and quarried stone for the roads and airstrips.

The Allies were confronted with an interior covered with rainforest and tall mountains where wheeled vehicles could not operate. The Australian Army was forced to rely on air transport and native carriers, two modes of transportation that it had never used before. The techniques and technologies to deliver supplies by air were in their infancy. There were few aircraft available, and these were of a variety of different types, complicating maintenance. Air operations in New Guinea were restricted by the weather. Transport aircraft were vulnerable in the air, and required fighter escorts. They were also subject to destruction on the ground by Japanese air raids. The loss of the airstrip at Kokoda led to the adoption of air dropping. Due to a shortage of parachutes, supplies often had to be dropped without them, and loss due to breakages and unrecoverable goods was high.

Thousands of Papuans were conscripted to help the war effort. Trucks and jeeps carried stores, ammunition and rations only part of the way; pack animals and a flying fox took them a bit farther. The rest of the journey was completed on the backs of Papuan carriers, who struggled over the mountains lugging heavy loads. The environment posed the danger of endemic tropic diseases, particularly dysentery, scrub typhus and malaria. Medical units had to combat these, while caring for the sick and wounded, many of whom had to walk back to the base area along the Kokoda Track. Often the Papuan carriers had to carry the wounded on the way back, earning them the sobriquet of "Fuzzy Wuzzy Angels".

== Background ==
=== Geography ===
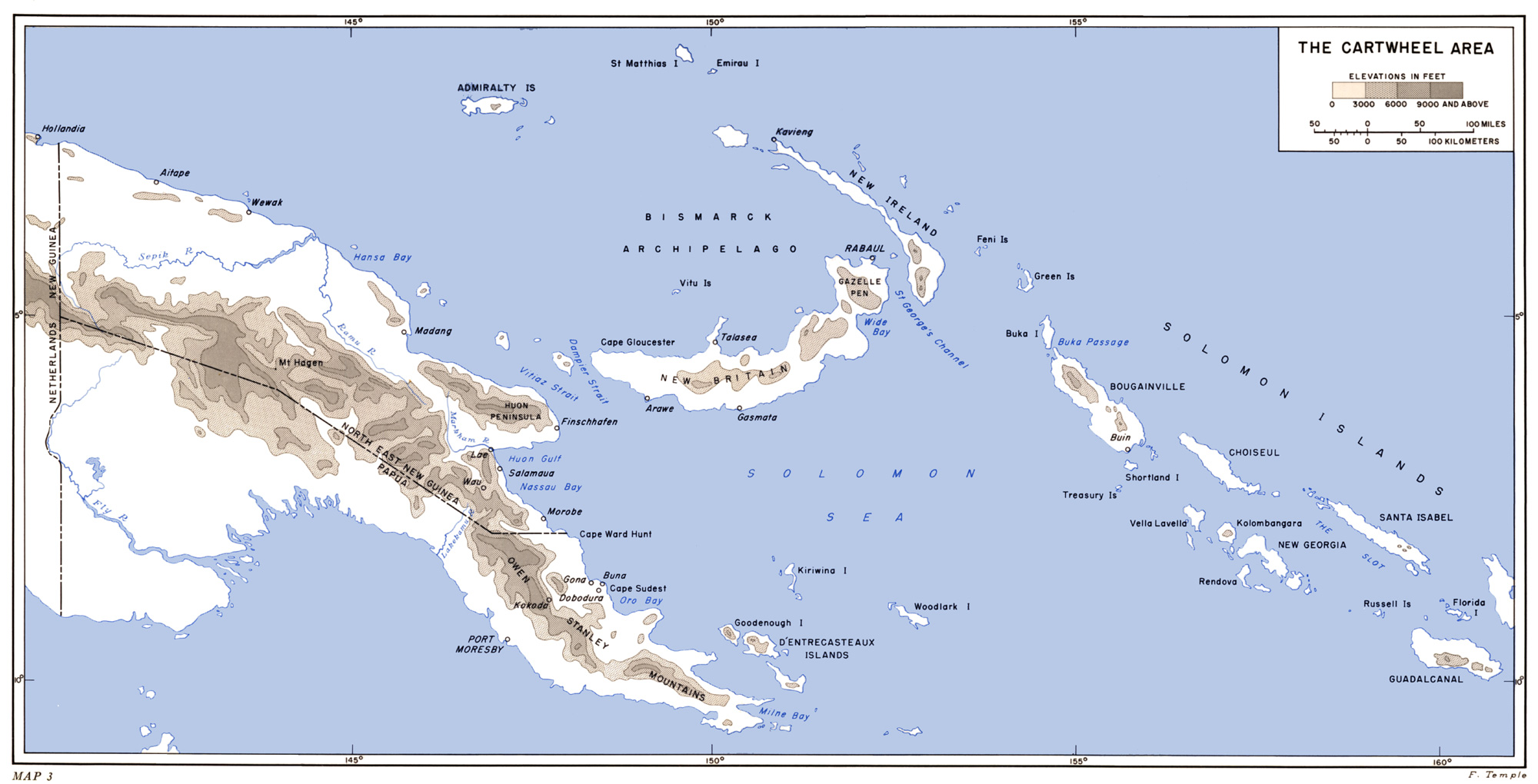
Papua, North East New Guinea, and the Solomon Islands

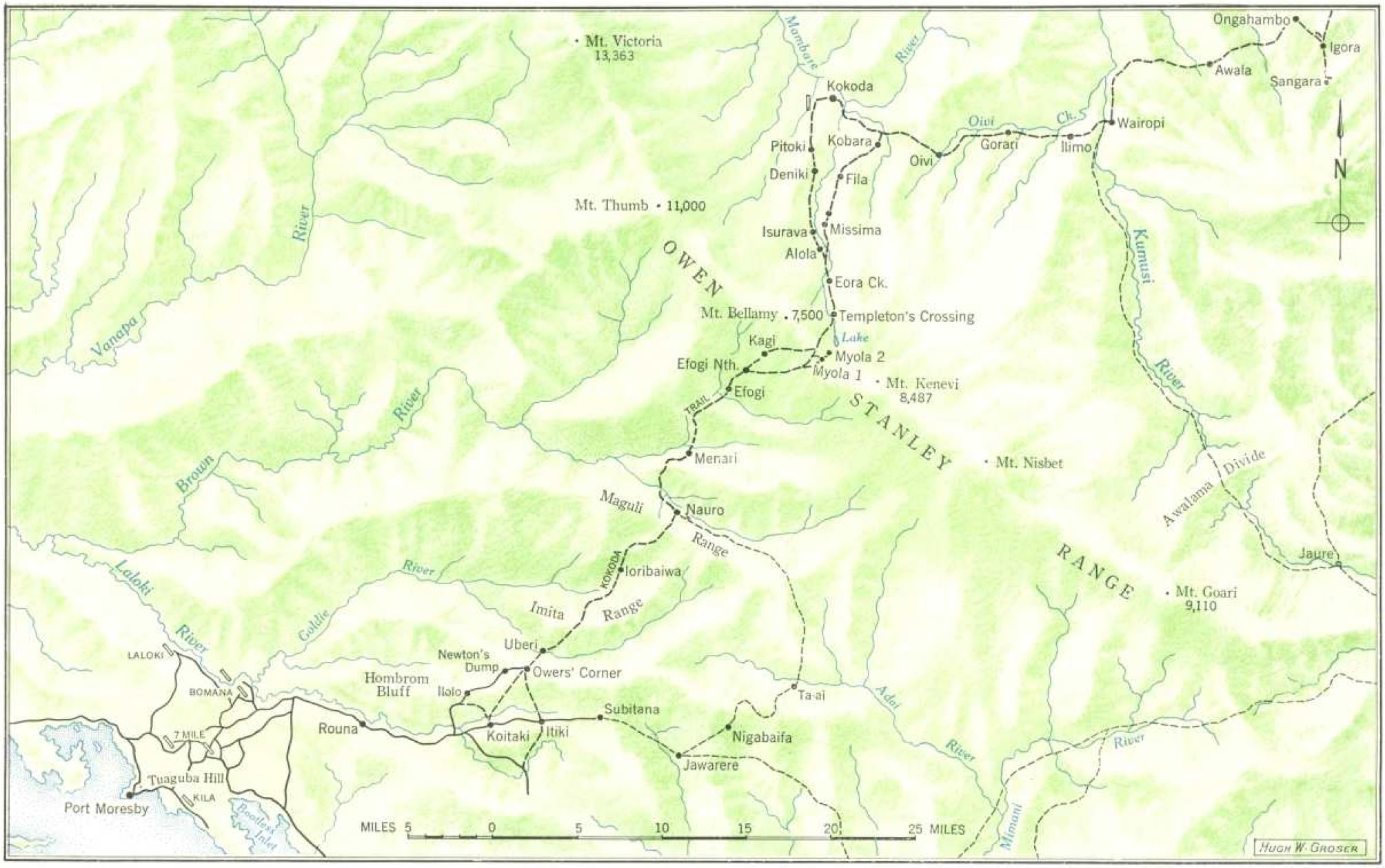
The Kokoda Track

In 1942, Papua was a territory of Australia. Around 240,000 square kilometres (91,000 sq mi) in area, it occupied the south eastern part of the island of New Guinea. The vegetation is largely rainforest; higher altitudes are covered in moss. The climate is mostly hot and humid with high rainfall, although the higher parts are cold, particularly at night. Tropical diseases, including malaria, scrub typhus, hookworm and dysentery were endemic. The native population also suffered from tropical ulcers, yaws and vitamin deficiency diseases, mainly beri beri.

The population was about 300,000, of whom 1,800 were Europeans; there were very few Asians owing to Australia's immigration policy. The main exports were copra and natural rubber, of which it contributed about one-eighth of Australia's supply. There had been little development and the territory was largely devoid of infrastructure except around the administrative centre of Port Moresby on the southern coast, which had two airfields and basic port facilities. Port Moresby was relatively dry, with a rainfall of less than 1,000 millimetres (40 in) per annum, mostly as a result of the north eastern monsoon, which comes between December and April. By air, it was 1,150 kilometres (620 nmi) from the nearest Allied airbase at Townsville, although there was a small airfield on Horn Island in the Torres Strait, whereas the Japanese airfields at Lae and Salamaua were less than 370 kilometres (200 nmi) away.

The Kokoda Track is a foot track that runs roughly south west from Kokoda 96 kilometres (60 mi) overland through the Owen Stanley Range toward Port Moresby. It was used before the war as a mail route. While there is a main track that is associated with the fighting during the campaign, there are many parallel, interlocking tracks that follow much the same general course. The track reaches a height of 4,694 metres (15,400 ft). The terrain rises and falls with regularity, up to 5,000 metres (16,000 ft). This markedly increases the distance to be traversed, although there are flat areas, particularly around Myola. The higher elevations are frequently above cloud level, resulting in fog.

=== Strategy ===
In the first six months of the Pacific War Japanese forces overran the Dutch East Indies and many nearby territories. Rabaul was captured on 23 January 1942, Singapore fell on 15 February, Lae and Salamaua were occupied on 8 March, and Java surrendered on 9 March. Lieutenant General George Brett, the American commander in Australia, feared that the Japanese would invade north western Australia. The Australian Chiefs of Staff disagreed. In an appreciation drafted by Major General Sydney Rowell, then the Australian Deputy Chief of the General Staff, on 5 March they argued that the Japanese would attempt to cut Australia's communications with the United States by moving against Port Moresby, New Caledonia and Fiji. By mid-April, Allied intelligence was warning of an imminent Japanese seaborne attack on Port Moresby, which was repulsed in the Battle of the Coral Sea on 5–8 May.

General Douglas MacArthur arrived in Australia on 17 March, and was appointed Supreme Commander of the newly established South West Pacific Area (SWPA) on 18 April. Ultra intelligence picked up Japanese plans for an overland advance on 19 May, and on 9 June he informed the commander of Allied Land Forces, General Sir Thomas Blamey, that the evidence was mounting that the Japanese might attempt to attack Port Moresby overland from Buna via Kokoda. On 20 June, Blamey ordered Brigadier Basil Morris, the commander of the 8th Military District, in charge of all the troops in Papua and New Guinea, to prevent such an attempt. In the wake of the Battle of Midway on 4–7 June, MacArthur began planning to recapture Rabaul. On 15 July, the Joint Chiefs of Staff ordered the first phase of the advance, the capture of Guadalcanal, despite MacArthur's warning that inadequate aircraft, airbases and shipping resources on hand made the operation extremely risky. A first step was to secure the Buna area, where airfields could be established from whence the Japanese bases could be attacked without aircraft having to overfly the Owen Stanley Range.

== Organisation ==
The Australian Chiefs of Staff identified Port Moresby as an important outpost early in the war. A company of the 15th Infantry Battalion was sent to Port Moresby in July 1940 and in October was transferred to the 49th Infantry Battalion. In February 1941, the Chiefs of Staff decided to reinforce the garrison by sending the rest of the 49th Infantry Battalion, a Militia unit, but specially enlisted for service in the tropics.

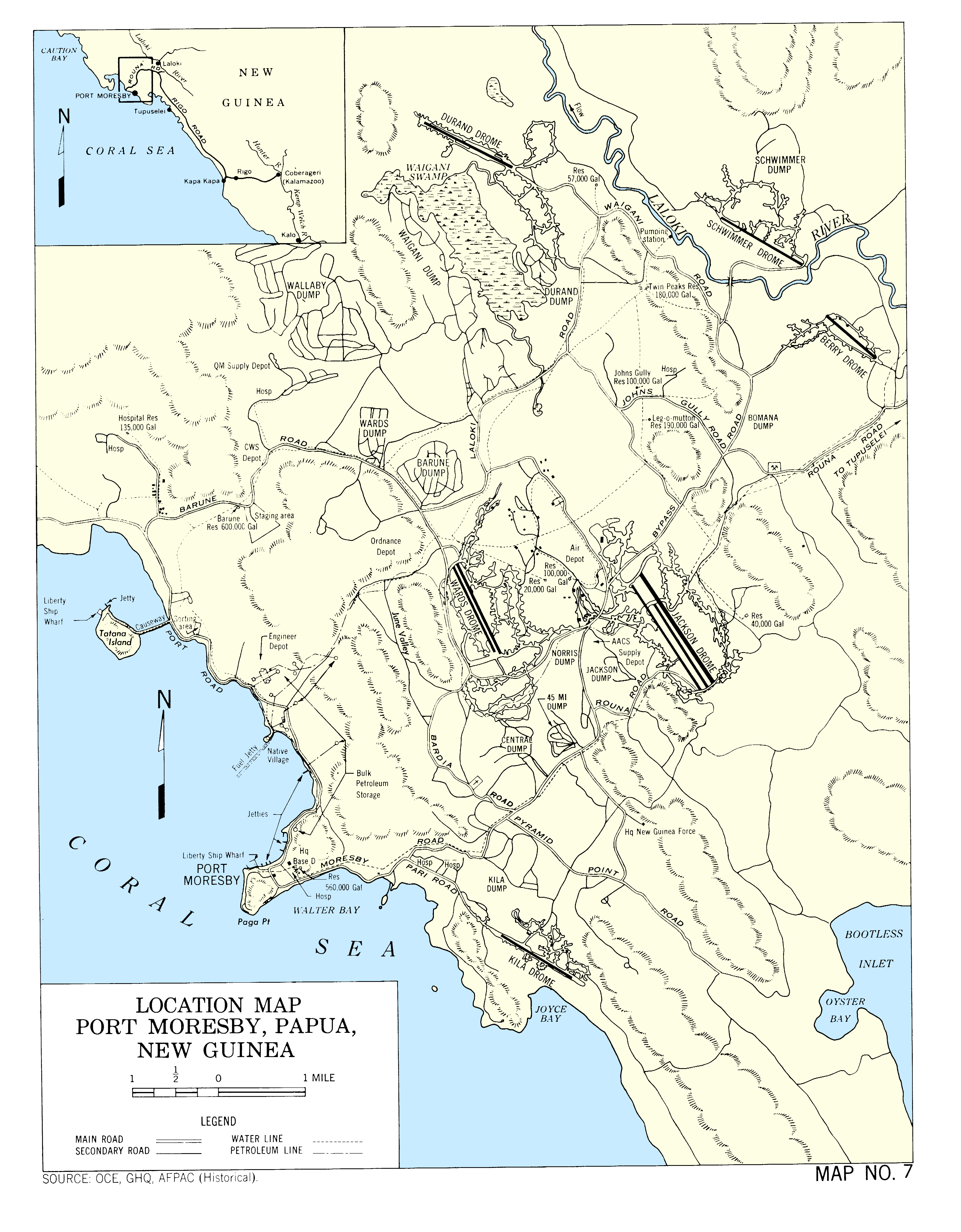
Port Moresby and the base installations

On 8 December, warned that the Japanese might attack Rabaul and Port Moresby, the Chief of the General Staff, Lieutenant General Vernon Sturdee decided to reinforce the garrison, sending the 39th and 53rd Infantry Battalions, and other units of the 30th Infantry Brigade, and the guns of the 13th Field Regiment and the 23rd Heavy Anti-Aircraft Battery. In January 1942, the Royal Australian Air Force (RAAF) at Port Moresby consisted of six Hudson light bombers, four Wirraway general purpose aircraft and two Catalina flying boats. No fighters were available.

The first Japanese air raid on Port Moresby occurred on 3 February 1942, and the anti-aircraft gunners shot down their first Japanese aircraft on 28 February, during a raid in which two RAAF Catalinas were destroyed. The February 1942 raids touched off panic, disorder and looting which Morris did not have the provost resources to control. The first fighter aircraft, Kittyhawks of No. 75 Squadron RAAF under the command of Squadron Leader John Francis Jackson, reached Port Moresby on 21 March, flying by way of Horn Island because they lacked the range to fly directly from Townsville. They soon became involved in the Battle of Port Moresby, taking heavy losses, and were relieved by the Bell P-39 Airacobras of the US 35th and 36th Fighter Squadrons on 30 April. Port Moresby experienced its one-hundredth air raid on 23 January 1943.

The first unit of the Second Australian Imperial Force (AIF) to arrive, the 2/3rd Light Anti-Aircraft Battery, disembarked on 11 April 1942, having returned to Australia from the Middle East just four weeks before. The US 101st Coast Artillery (Anti-Aircraft) Battalion followed on 5 May, and its commander, Lieutenant Colonel Joseph B. Fraser, took charge of Port Moresby's anti-aircraft defences. Morris's command became New Guinea Force on 15 April. By the end of June the ground forces in New Guinea consisted of 1,098 AIF, 12,273 Militia and 2,208 American troops.

On 24 June, Morris ordered the 39th Infantry Battalion (less one company) and the Papuan Infantry Battalion, as Maroubra Force, to defend Kokoda. The Japanese landed in the Buna area on 21 July. At this point, B Company of the 39th Infantry Battalion was at Kokoda, with C Company advancing along the track, departing Ilolo on 23 July. The remainder of the battalion was poised to move and most of it had arrived at Deniki by 4 August. Maroubra Force was run out of Kokoda on 29 July. MacArthur was sanguine about this, believing that the landings on Guadalcanal on 8 August would cause the Japanese to withdraw to Buna. Blamey was not so sure, and ordered the AIF 7th Division, under the command of Major General Arthur Allen, to Port Moresby to reinforce Maroubra Force.

On 12 August 1942, Rowell assumed command of New Guinea Force. Morris remained as commander of the Australian New Guinea Administrative Unit (ANGAU), which was responsible for civil affairs in Papua and New Guinea. United States Army Services of Supply (USASOS) units in Papua were initially part of Base Section 2 in Far North Queensland, but on 20 August 1942, the US Advanced Base, New Guinea, was established under the command of Colonel A. J. Matthews. At first there was no Australian equivalent. Blamey suggested that one was required. Rowell demurred, but agreed to a Port Moresby Base Sub Area commander with a small staff. He emphasised that what he wanted was not some "officer wallah type" but a "practical man with commonsense". So Blamey sent Major Charles Moses, who possessed the requested attributes, being a former officer of the 8th Division who had escaped from Singapore.

Blamey superseded Rowell in command of New Guinea Force on 23 September. MacArthur visited Blamey in Port Moresby on 4 October 1942 and the two agreed to establish a Combined Operations Service Command (COSC) to co-ordinate logistical activities. To command it, MacArthur appointed Brigadier General Dwight Johns, the deputy commander of USASOS in SWPA, an expert on airbase construction. He was given an Australian deputy, Brigadier Victor Secombe, who had directed the rehabilitation of the port of Tobruk in 1941. All Australian and American logistical units were placed under COSC, which also controlled a fleet of small craft and luggers.

== Shipping ==
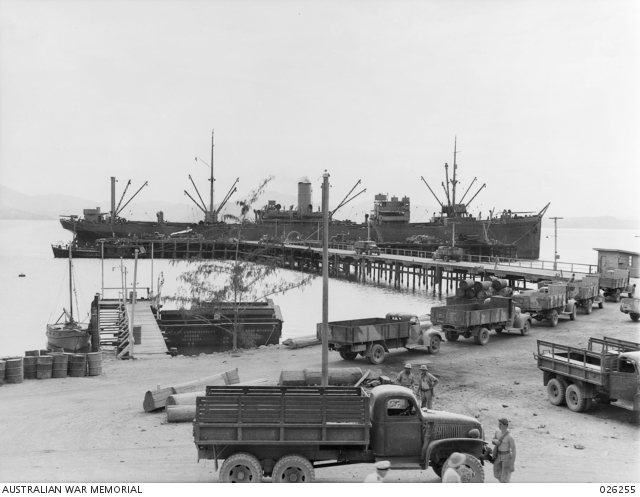
A cargo ship being unloaded at the wharf in Port Moresby in August 1942

Since New Guinea is an island, logistic support of the defenders ultimately depended on shipping. Australia started the war at a disadvantage because the Bruce-Page government sold the Government Line at a loss in 1928, leaving the country without shipping under national control. Australian ships were requisitioned by the Shipping Control Board, and by the end of 1942 almost all Australian coastal vessels had been taken up by the Board, the armed services, or the Americans. The Board resorted to chartering ships, but few were obtainable, as the British Ministry of War Transport and the American War Shipping Administration were in control of almost all the world's shipping. Some 24 ships were on charter on 1 January 1942; 22 were on 1 January 1943. Some "refugee" ships—ships from occupied countries—reached Australian ports in 1942, although many of these were already on charter.

An important role in the upcoming campaign was played by 21 Dutch Koninklijke Paketvaart-Maatschappij (KPM) refugee ships of 1,400 to 17,000 cubic metres (500 to 6,000 grt). These, along with two other refugee ships and six vessels originally intended for the Shipping Control Board, were transferred to American control. During 1942, 11,000,000 cubic metres (3,800,000 grt) of cargo was carried by chartered ships, of which 5,700,000 cubic metres (2,000,000 grt) was coastal cargo. Lacking other options, resort was made to using ships on overseas voyages to carry coastal cargo. Between April and November 1942, this averaged 530,000 cubic metres (188,000 grt) each month. In addition, the Australian Army operated five troopships: the Katoomba and Duntroon, which could each carry 1,500 troops; and the smaller Gorgon, Taroona and Ormiston, which carried between 590 and 650 troops each. Having separate American and Australian shipping organisations saved the two armies from having to learn each other's procedures while still trying to master their own, but it created inefficiencies through the need for coordination.

Twenty merchant ships were lost in Axis naval activity in Australian waters in 1942. In an air raid on Port Moresby on 17 June 1942, the 12,920-cubic-metre (4,561 grt) MV Macdhui was hit and set ablaze; three crewmen and a member of the Army working party were killed. A second air raid the following day scored more direct hits on the ship, which burned fiercely, and was a total loss. Five more members of the crew were killed and one fatally injured. Another 63 men were injured in the attack, including the master, Captain James Campbell. Two ships were attacked by Japanese submarines in the Gulf of Papua. The Ro-33 sank the 850-cubic-metre (300 grt) MV Mamutu by gunfire on 6 August 1942, and machine gunned survivors in the water. Of Mamutu's 142 passengers and crew, 114 were lost. Ro-33 struck again on 29 August, torpedoing the 9,400-cubic-metre (3,310 grt) MV Malaita, which was returning to Cairns after delivering troops and supplies to Port Moresby. Although listing ten degrees to starboard, Malaita remained afloat, and was taken in tow by MV Matafele and HMAS Potrero. Their escort, the destroyer HMAS Arunta, picked up an ASDIC contact on the Ro-33, and delivered a series of depth charge attacks and sank it.

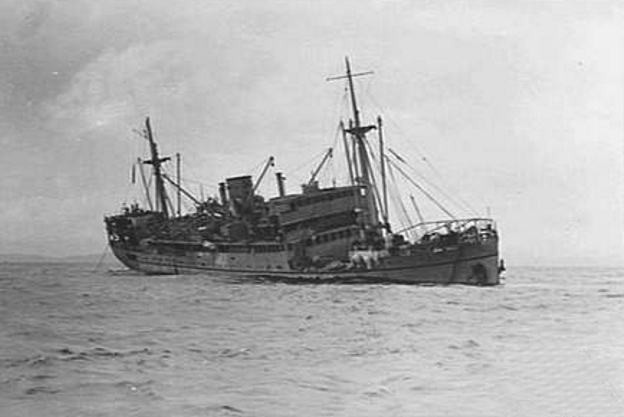
MV Malaita lists after being torpedoed by the Ro-33 off Port Moresby on 29 August 1942

Port Moresby became congested in September 1942. This represented a dangerous situation, as ships there were subject to Japanese air attacks, so procedures were instituted whereby ships would wait at Townsville until called forward. Due to lack of capacity at Port Moresby, it made no sense for ships to travel in convoy, so they sailed to and from Port Moresby individually or in small groups. Convoys to New Guinea did not commence until December 1942. Turnaround time for ships from Townsville to Port Moresby was 11 to 13 days, of which five to seven were spent awaiting discharge in Port Moresby. Some 125 ship voyages were made to Port Moresby between May and November 1942. During 1942, 3,033 vehicles, 199 guns and 210,440 tonnes (207,116 long tons) of stores were shipped to New Guinea.

The standard ocean-going cargo ship was the Liberty ship. They were not ideal for logistical purposes. With a maximum speed of 20 kilometres per hour (11 kn), they were slow, but this was considered less important than their ability to be turned out cheaply and in large numbers. They were deliberately built small, which reduced the loss when one was sunk, but limited the cargo capacity to 7,291 tonnes (7,176 long tons). Critically, their draft was 8.41 metres (27 ft 7 in) when fully laden. They had five small holds, each with its own hatch. Their curved sides made them wider at the top than the bottom, and wider amidships than fore and aft. Containerisation of shipping did not begin until a decade after the war, so most wartime military shipments were break bulk cargo, with goods in bags, boxes, crates, barrels and drums. This was very efficient in terms of shipping space, but loading and unloading was consequently slow and manpower intensive. It also meant that ships could be unloaded with their own tackle, without special port facilities. Loading a ship was something of an art form. The ideal was to make best use of irregular spaces. Goods had to be stowed so as to wedge everything together tightly, as items that shifted at sea could break open and cause damage to their contents and other items. A load that shifted could even cause the ship to capsize.

Loading at Australian ports was frequently disorganised and sloppy. Manifests were not flown ahead, so New Guinea Force did not know the contents of a shipment beforehand. Some ships arrived without manifests. The labelling of contents was also poor, and boxes often had to be broken into to determine their contents. Even then it was not always apparent who the intended recipient was. Much of the problem was poor staff work by the inexperienced Movement Control staff at Advanced Allied Land Forces Headquarters (LHQ) in Brisbane. The Australian Army had never had to handle such work before. Men with experience in the shipping industry were appointed as Movement Control officers, but it took time for them to learn about military cargoes and procedures.

== Base development ==
=== Port ===
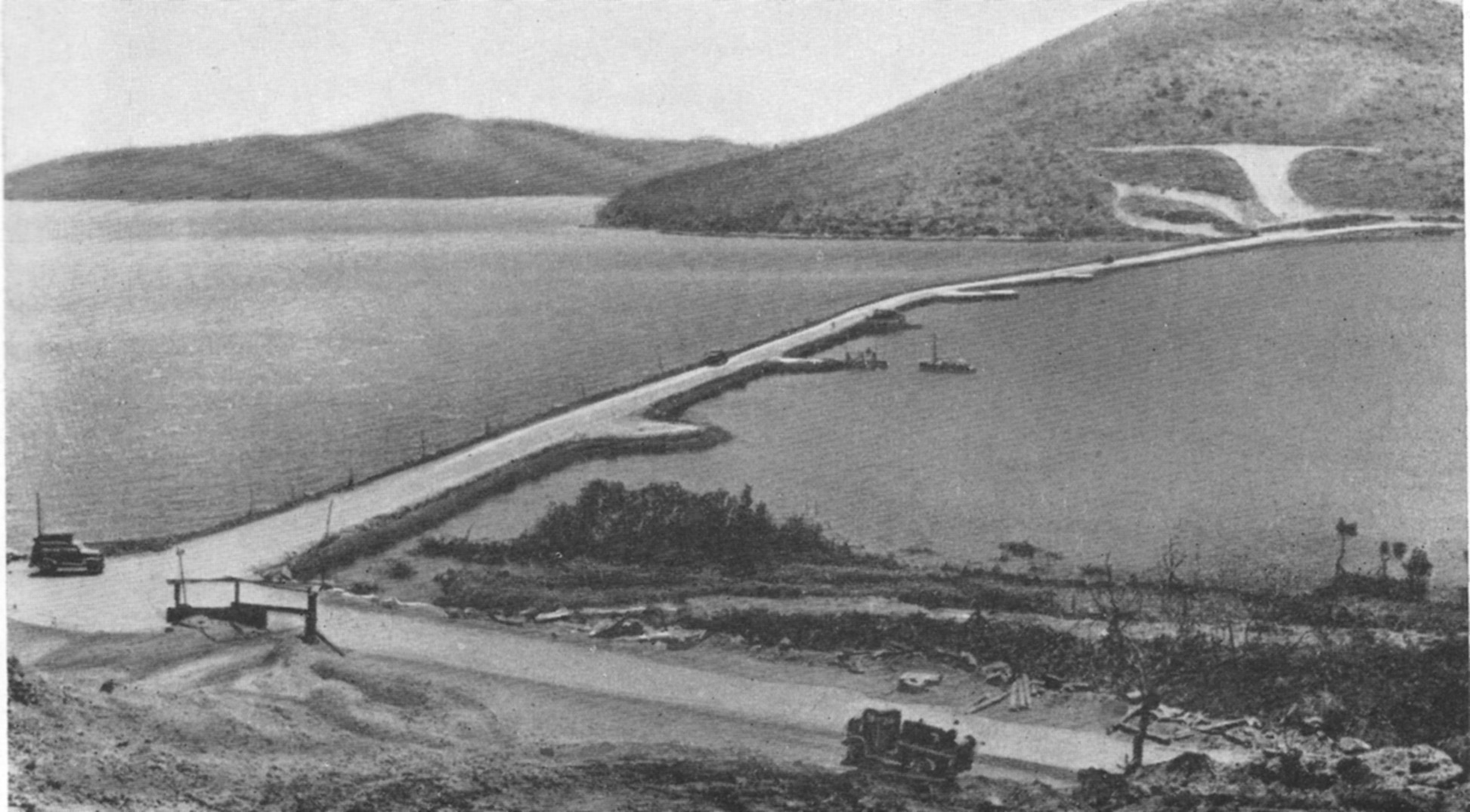
Causeway to Tatana Island

In early 1942 Port Moresby had only one deepwater wharf and two small jetties. Another pre-war wharf had existed at Bootless Inlet but in the panic, had been demolished and the inlet mined without recording the location of the mines. The timber wharf had an approach that was 150 metres (500 ft) long and 7.3 metres (24 ft) wide and a T-section 98 metres (320 ft) long and 15 metres (50 ft) wide. As such, it could accommodate only one Liberty ship at a time. The jetties, one stone and one timber, were just 30 metres (100 ft) long, and could be used only by lighters and shallow draft vessels.

To increase the rate of discharge, the Tug and Lighter Company, a unit which had served in the siege of Tobruk, was sent to Port Moresby. On arrival on 23 August, it found only two lighters and no tugboats. It improvised, repairing the wharf's crane and salvaging tackle from the wreck of the Macdhui. Harbour craft arrived on Liberty ships over the next couple of months, but no more than one tug and ten lighters were available at any time during 1942. The African-American 611th Port Company arrived in June, and the Australian 2/1st Docks Operating Company in mid-September. Major R. C. Ballantyne, who had been in charge of wharf operations at Tobruk, was appointed Docks Superintendent. Unloading was still slowed by the lack of storage space in the wharf area. The dumps had been dispersed in the hills up to 40 kilometres (25 mi) from Port Moresby, the roads were poor, and there was a serious shortage of trucks to move stores from the wharf to the dumps.

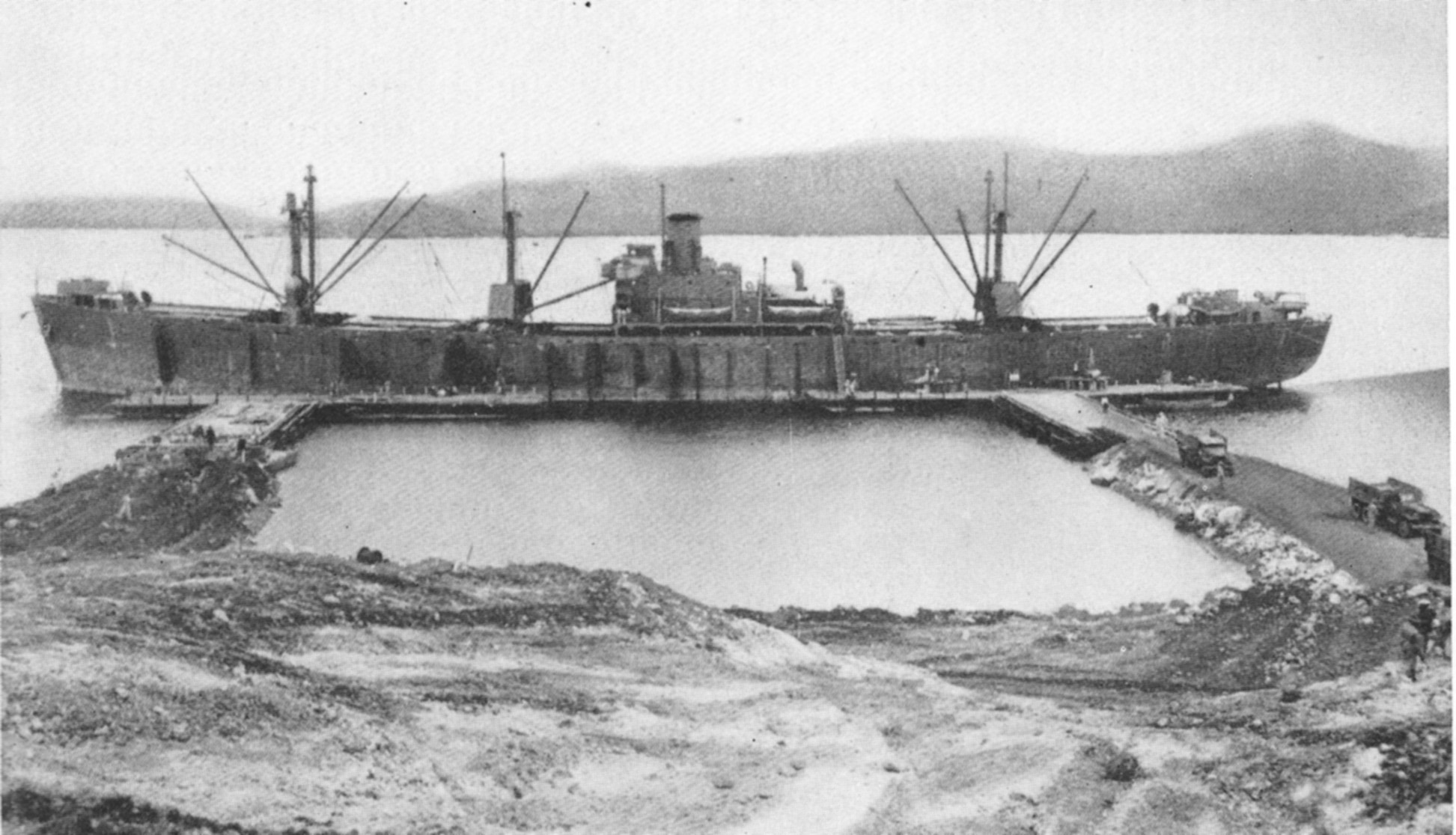
Ship berths on Tatana Island were initially earth causeways leading to pontoon docks, which were later replaced with pile structures

Eight ships bound for Port Moresby were lying idle off Townsville or Cairns on 12 October, waiting to be called forward. General Headquarters (GHQ) SWPA estimated that at the current rate of discharge it would take two weeks before they were called forward. Ironically, five of them were carrying equipment and stores needed to upgrade the port facilities. Extending the wharf required pilings and heavy timbers that were not immediately available. Matthews decided on a bold plan. Tatana Island, about 5 kilometres (3 mi) west of Port Moresby, had deep water off its northwest side. About 0.80 kilometres (1/2 mi) offshore, it was separated from the mainland by shallow water with a coral reef bottom. He proposed taking the 2nd Battalion, 96th General Service Regiment off its work on aerodrome maintenance and refuelling and rearming aircraft, and use them to construct a causeway from the mainland to Tatana Island, where pontoon docks could be built. The materials required were immediately available, but doubts were expressed about whether a causeway could withstand the force of storms and tides. Lacking boats for a hydrographic survey, one was conducted by wading during an exceptionally low tide in late September.

Work commenced on 5 October. Equipment and personnel were ferried across to Tatana Island so it could proceed from both ends. Some 1.8 to 3.7 metres (6 to 12 ft) of fill totalling 38,000 cubic metres (50,000 cu yd) was required to establish a roadway 690 metres (2,250 ft) long and 7.3 metres (24 ft) wide 0.6 metres (2 ft) above the high tide mark. Work was completed on 30 October and the first ship berthed there on 3 November. Port capacity was increased from 1,400 to 4,100 tonnes (1,400 to 4,000 long tons) per day. However, the project did not proceed without controversy. A heavy downpour on 21 October confirmed the airmen's worst fears, and Lieutenant General George C. Kenney, the commander of Allied Air Forces (AAF), sent a letter to MacArthur on 26 October informing him that while work to upgrade the airfield runways before the wet season was nearly completed, aircraft could not operate from them without taxiways, hardstands, facilities and access roads, all of which were far from ready. He warned that he might have to withdraw at least two squadrons back to Australia. Major General Richard Sutherland, MacArthur's chief of staff at GHQ, and Brigadier General Hugh J. Casey, his chief engineer, reassured Kenney everything possible would be done to keep the airfields operational in the wet season. Additional engineer units were ordered to Port Moresby, and work on the port and the Nine Mile Quarry was handed over to the Australians.

=== Airfields ===
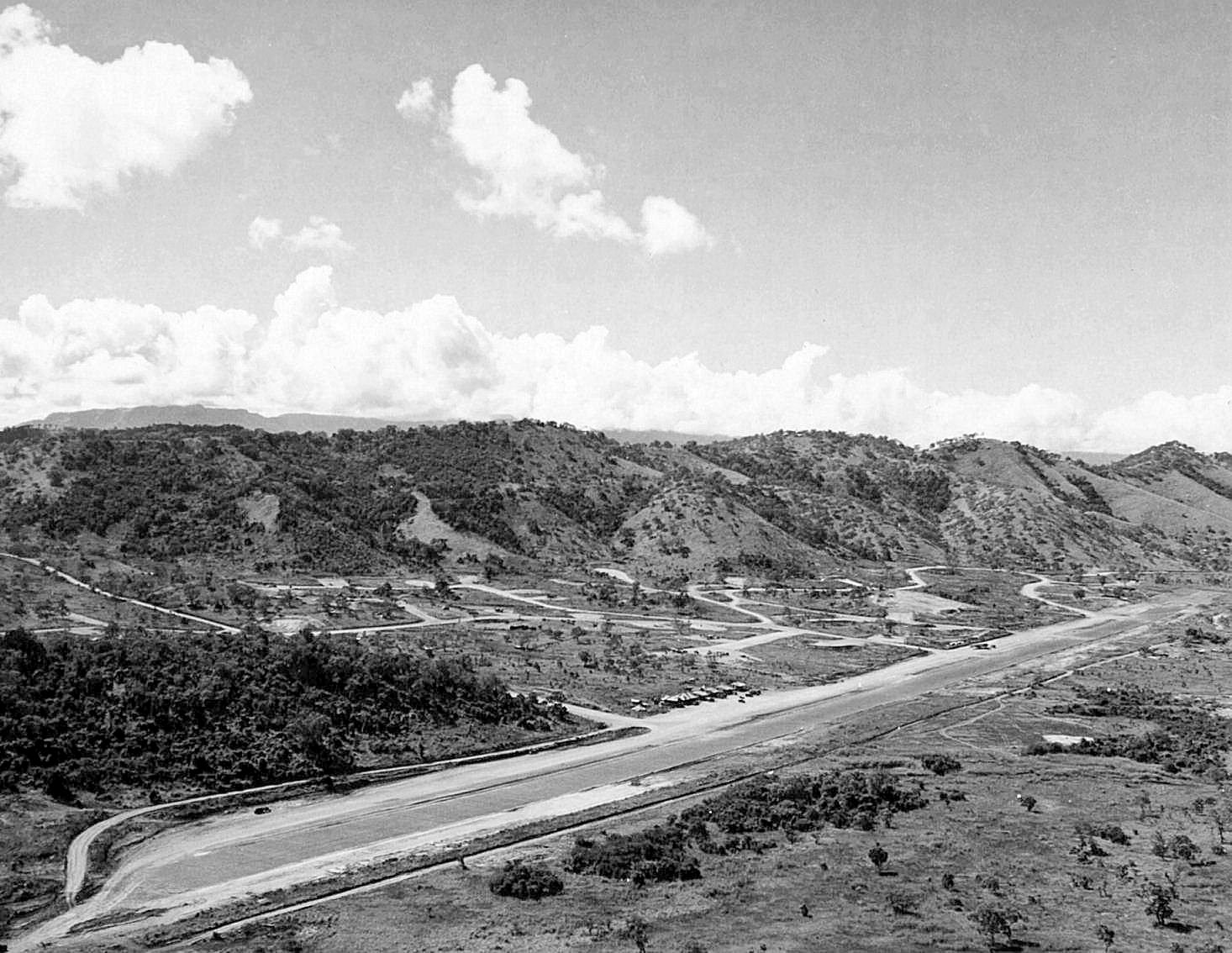
Kila Drome, also known as Three Mile Drome

On 31 March—just a fortnight after his arrival in Australia—MacArthur sent Casey and his air officer, Brigadier General Harold H. George to survey the situation in Port Moresby. They drew up plans to develop it into a base to support future operations. They recognised that to secure the area required work far beyond its environs. They called for the airfield at Horn Island to be upgraded, and new airfields to be constructed on the Cape York Peninsula north of Townsville around Mareeba, Cooktown and Coen. This would allow ships to have fighter cover crossing the Torres Strait. To protect Port Moresby's eastern flank, GHQ decided to establish an airstrip in the Abau–Mullins Harbour area. Milne Bay was subsequently determined to be a better location, and a garrison was sent by sea from Port Moresby on 22 June. Another strip, at Merauke on the south coast of Dutch New Guinea, was authorised on 22 June to protect the western flank.

The airfields in the Port Moresby area were initially known by their approximate distance from Port Moresby. In April 1942, there were only two operational airfields: Seven Mile Drome, an airfield developed by the RAAF with a single 1,524-by-23-metre (5,000 by 75 ft) runway, and Three Mile Drome (also known as Kila Airfield), a pre-war civilian airfield. Work had commenced on two more: Fourteen Mile, also known as Laloki, and Five Mile, which had originally been developed as an emergency landing strip. Four more were subsequently developed: Twelve Mile, Fourteen Mile, Seventeen Mile and Thirty Mile.

On 10 November, the Port Moresby airfields, except for Kila, were renamed after men who had been killed defending them. Seven Mile was renamed after Jackson, who was shot down over Port Moresby on 28 April; Fourteen Mile after Charles Schwimmer, one of four American P-39 pilots who was lost in an attack on Lae on 4 May; and Five Mile after Lieutenant Colonel Kenneth Ward, the commander of the 53rd Infantry Battalion, who was involved in its construction, and was killed in the fighting on the Kokoda Track on 27 August. Twelve Mile was renamed Berry after Major Jack W. Berry, the commander of the 39th Fighter Squadron, who was killed on a practice bombing mission on 4 August when his bomb exploded directly underneath his aircraft, causing it to flip and crash into the sea. Seventeen Mile was renamed Durand after First Lieutenant Edward D. Durand, the first American fighter pilot shot down over New Guinea. After being forced down near Salamaua on 30 April, he was captured and executed by the Japanese. Thirty Mile Drome, also known as Rorona, was renamed Rogers after Major Floyd (Buck) Rogers, the commander of the 8th Bombardment Squadron, whose A-24 Banshee dive bomber was shot down over Gona on 29 July.

Engineer units in Port Moresby at the end of April were the 7th Field Company, 1st Army Troops Company, the field stores section of the 61st Field Park Company, a section of the 1st Mechanical Equipment Company, and the 1st Bomb Disposal Section. The 14th Field Company arrived with the 14th Infantry Brigade in May. The first US troops to be stationed in New Guinea were an advance party of the African-American 96th Engineer Battalion on 28 April, but the battalion was not complete until June. They were followed by Company E of the 43rd Engineer General Service Regiment and a dump truck section of the 576th Engineer Company. The 808th Engineer Aviation Battalion arrived in July. The 96th Engineer Battalion was reorganised as the 96th Engineer General Service Regiment in September. In response to Kenney's 26 October warning to MacArthur, the 46th and 91st Engineer General Service Regiments and the rest of the 576th Dump Truck Company were ordered to move to Port Moresby in November.

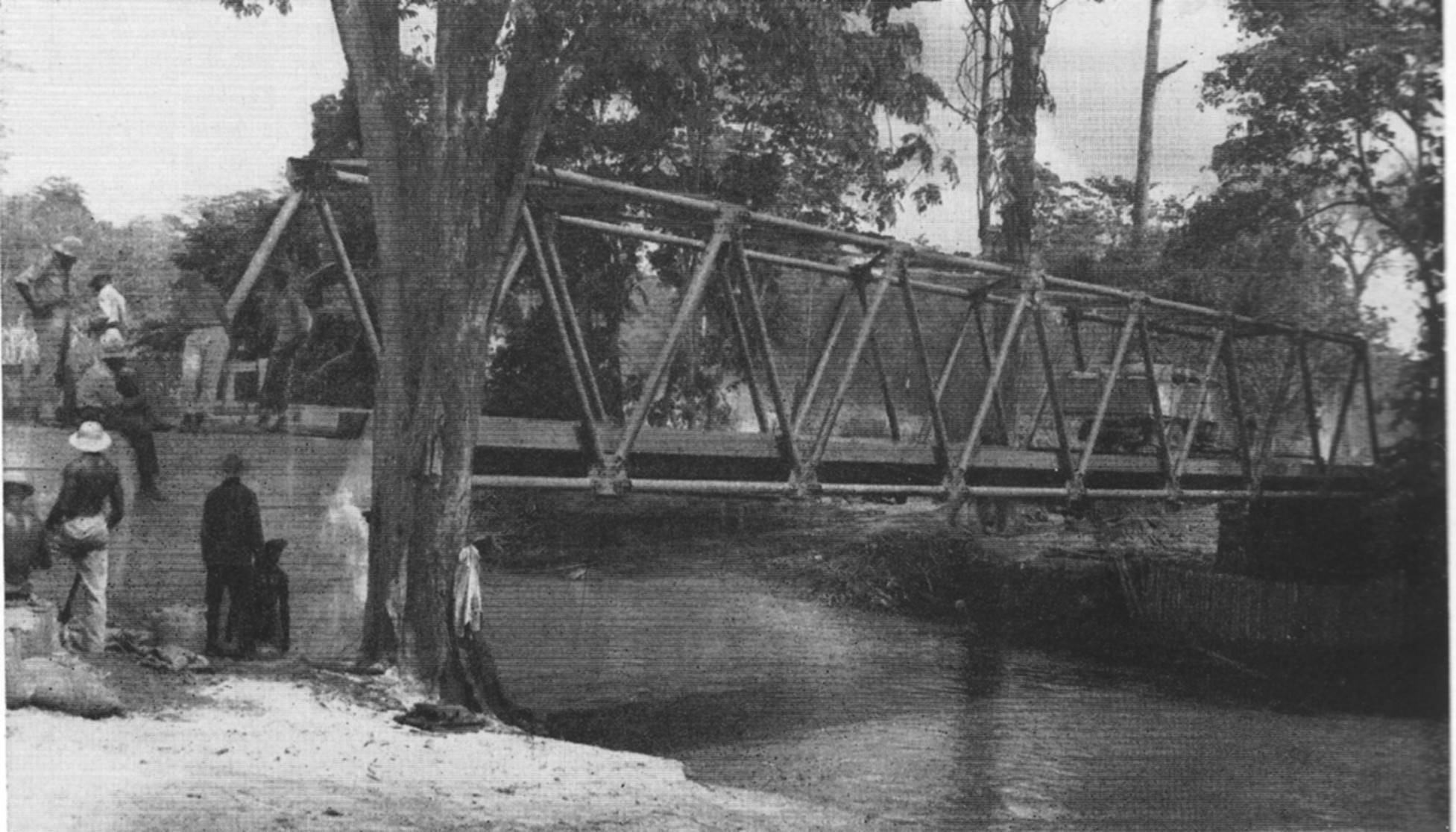
Steel bridge over the Laloki River completing the route between Port Moresby and Schwimmer Drome

The main mission of the 96th was patching Jackson Drome's runways after Japanese bombing, but they also assisted with refuelling aircraft and loading them with bombs, and unloading ships in the harbour. It was found that craters could not be repaired simply by filling the holes with rubble. They would quickly fill with water, settle, and become a bog hole. A proper repair required that the water be pumped out, and the crater filled with stone, which had to be compacted, rolled and re-surfaced. In addition to the craters, bombing sprayed fragments that could puncture tyres, causing accidents on takeoff and landing. A visual search for fragments had to be made after each raid.

The engineers discovered that they had much to learn about airfield construction in Papua, particularly the importance of proper drainage. The arrival of the 808th Engineer Aviation Battalion permitted extensive rehabilitation work on Jackson. The runway had been sealed with an excess of bitumen, which became soft in the heat, and parked aircraft tended to sink into it. When the bitumen was removed to be re-laid, hydroscopic clay under parts of the runway became supersaturated through seepage, and springs developed. The engineers were forced to install underground drains, and put down a new 25-centimetre (10 in) base of crushed rock, which was sealed with bitumen. Although air operations were curtailed, the airfield remained operational.

Kila Drome was originally considered too poorly-located to be more than an emergency strip, because a high ridge 1,800 metres (2,000 yd) from one end of the runway, restricted air operations. However, the airfield was seldom fogged in, and could often operate when all the other airfields were closed. It was therefore decided to increase the runway to 1,524 by 30 metres (5,000 by 100 ft). The first coat of bitumen was applied in November 1942, but before the final coat could be applied, heavy rains came and saturated the subgrade. The runway rutted and became more hazardous than ever. The 96th Engineer General Service Regiment dug a ditch along the length of the runway, but this became another aviation safety hazard. The ditch was then filled in with rock to create a French drain.

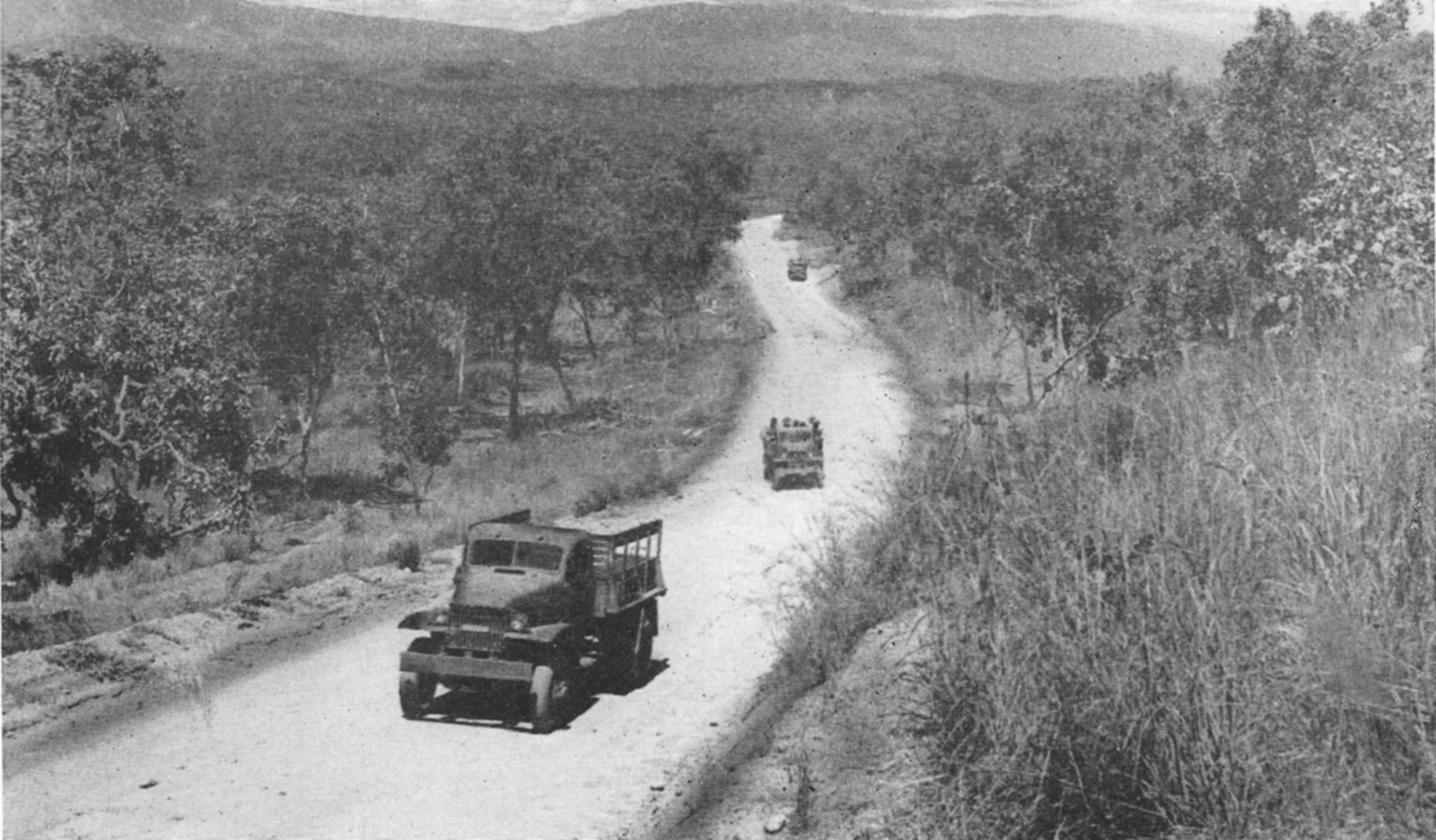
Supply road from Port Moresby to Jackson Drome

Bulldozers carved Schwimmer Drome out of the jungle. Only a few feet above the normal level of the Laloki River, it was susceptible to periodic flooding. The base material used for the 1,402-by-30-metre (4,600 by 100 ft) runway was laid over alluvial sand and gravel, and Marston Mat used for the surface. The resulting runway was not capable of all-weather operation, so a second runway was constructed parallel to the first. This time gravel dredged from the Laloki River was used as a base. It was spread while wet and then rolled to form a firm base. Marston Mat was removed from the original to provide a surface for the new 1,524-by-30-metre (5,000 by 100 ft) all-weather runway, which was ready for use in November 1942. A low trestle bridge over the Laloki River provided access. It was understood that the bridge might be washed away by floods, so pontoon equipment was provided for this eventuality. This was needed; a downpour on 21 October swept away the bridge, and rendered Three Mile, Seven Mile and Thirty Mile non-operational. The bridge was replaced by a high steel structure.

Berry was located on higher ground south east of Schwimmer. Casey and George assigned it a high priority, and the 96th Engineer General Service Regiment was assigned to the task. The existing dry weather strip was cleared and grubbed for a 1,372-by-30-metre (4,500 by 100 ft) runway. The short runway restricted air operations to fighters and transports, but it could not be extended without extensive earth removal. It was ultimately surfaced with 20 centimetres (8 in) of crushed rock and gravel.

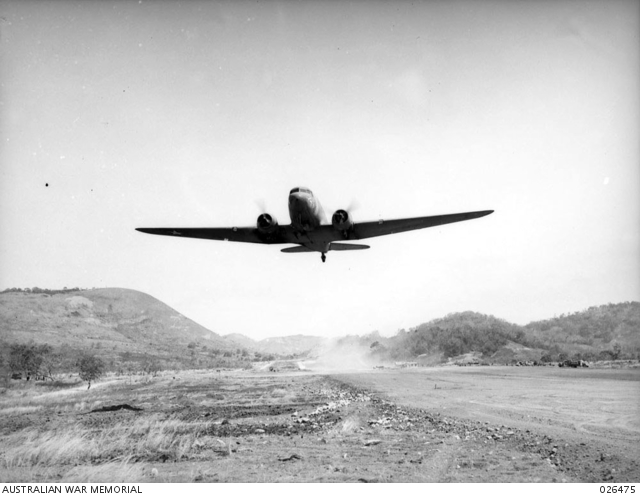
C-53 Dakota transport of the 21st Troop Carrier Squadron takes off from Kila on a supply dropping mission to the Kokoda area.

To enable heavy four-engine bombers to fly long-range missions, longer all-weather airfields were required. Casey designated two sites for development: the emergency airstrip at Wards, and a new site at Seventeen Mile. The work at Wards was assigned to No. 1 Mobile Works Squadron RAAF, which had been working on Wards since 17 August, surfacing it with gravel. It received its orders to construct a new 1,829-by-30-metre (6,000 by 100 ft) runway west of the old one on 11 September. The runway was provided with a 300-millimetre (12 in) compacted gravel surface to hold the weight of heavy bombers. As the squadron also had to construct a water pipeline from the Waigani Swamp, the schedule slipped. Following a visit on 3 November by Colonel Leif Sverdrup from GHQ and Matthews, now the head of construction at COSC, additional resources were allocated. B Company of the 2/1st Pioneer Battalion arrived on 13 November to assist with laying the Marston Mat and the water pipes. The 46th Engineer General Service Regiment assisted with the dispersal areas and revetments. The original runway was then upgraded to all-weather standard too. The other site designated for heavy bombers was Seventeen Mile. The 808th Engineer Aviation Battalion cleared and grubbed the area, and laid out the 1,829-by-30-metre (6,000 by 100 ft) runway. This was surfaced with 10 centimetres (4 in) of clay-bound shale, and sealed with tar to create an all-weather surface. This did not prove satisfactory, and Marston Mat had to be laid down.

The Thirty Mile site on Galley Reach, an inlet 48 kilometres (30 mi) north west of Port Moresby was accessible by water transport through a channel through the coral reef. A dry weather airstrip was constructed by Company E, 43rd Engineer General Service Regiment, with help from large numbers of Papuan labourers who loaded the river gravel into trucks. This was ready for use on 20 July, but to make it into an airbase required the construction of two docks on Galley Reach. In September, work was halted by the tactical situation, with Japanese patrols reported not far from Rorona. Air warning equipment was removed, and Marston Mat earmarked for Thirty Mile was allocated to other projects. By the end of November, the runway had been extended to 1,829 by 30 metres (6,000 by 100 ft), with 568-by-24-metre (1,865 by 80 ft) sections at each end topped with Marston Mat. Work continued on all the other airfields in 1943, but Rogers was abandoned.

=== Infrastructure ===
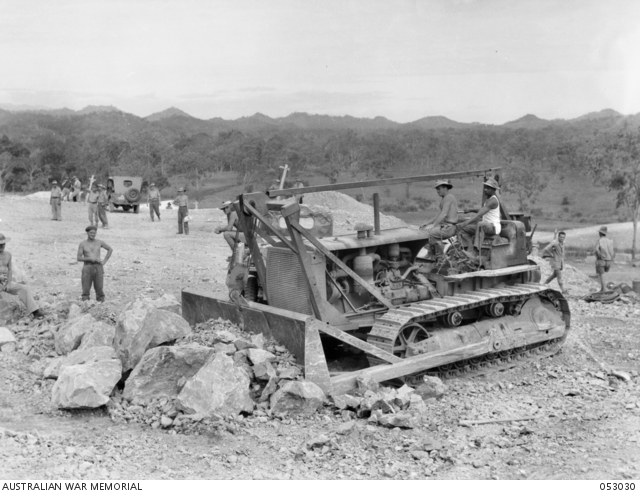
American and Australian engineers at the Nine Mile Quarry in June 1943

The 1st Army Troops Company was responsible for Port Moresby's utilities: the power house, freezers, electrical installations, lighting and water supply. By June 1942 the water supply was close to its maximum capacity, with the pumping station at Bomana pumping water from the Laloki River 24 hours a day. The main 25-centimetre (10 in) water main ran under the south eastern end of the Jackson Drome, a prime target for Japanese air raids, and the water pipe was consequently prone to damage. From one cause or another there were 40 to 50 breaks per month. By October 1942 the reservoir level was falling, indicating that usage was exceeding pumping capacity. A new intake and pumping station was constructed near Schwimmer Drome to bring water from the Laloki River to a treatment plant and concrete reservoir on Twin Peaks Mountain. The 1st Army Troops Company assumed responsibility for its operation upon its completion in March 1943.

Depots were established inland rather than in the vicinity of the port because the Japanese threatened a landing on the coast. A 32-kilometre-per-hour (20 mph) speed limit was imposed to minimise damage to the main road. This was covered with 100 millimetres (4 in) of dust that turned to mud when it rained. The surface soon broke up under heavy military traffic. The road was only wide enough to allow for one-way traffic and had a number of hairpin bends that required 3-ton trucks to make three-point turns. The 10th Advanced Ordnance Depot was established at 17 Mile in prefabricated huts, erected by Papuan labour, while the 8th Advanced Ammunition Depot handled the ammunition depots at 12 Mile and 19 Mile. In the crisis days of early 1942 some 2,500 tonnes (2,500 long tons) of ammunition was dumped where it was unloaded off the trucks and covered with tarpaulins, with only one storeman on hand to receive it. Soon, no one knew what lay under the tarpaulins. This was hard to rectify as there was an acute shortage of ordnance personnel due to the low priority accorded to service units. The 19 Mile site was poor and a new depot was developed on a better site at 12 Mile.

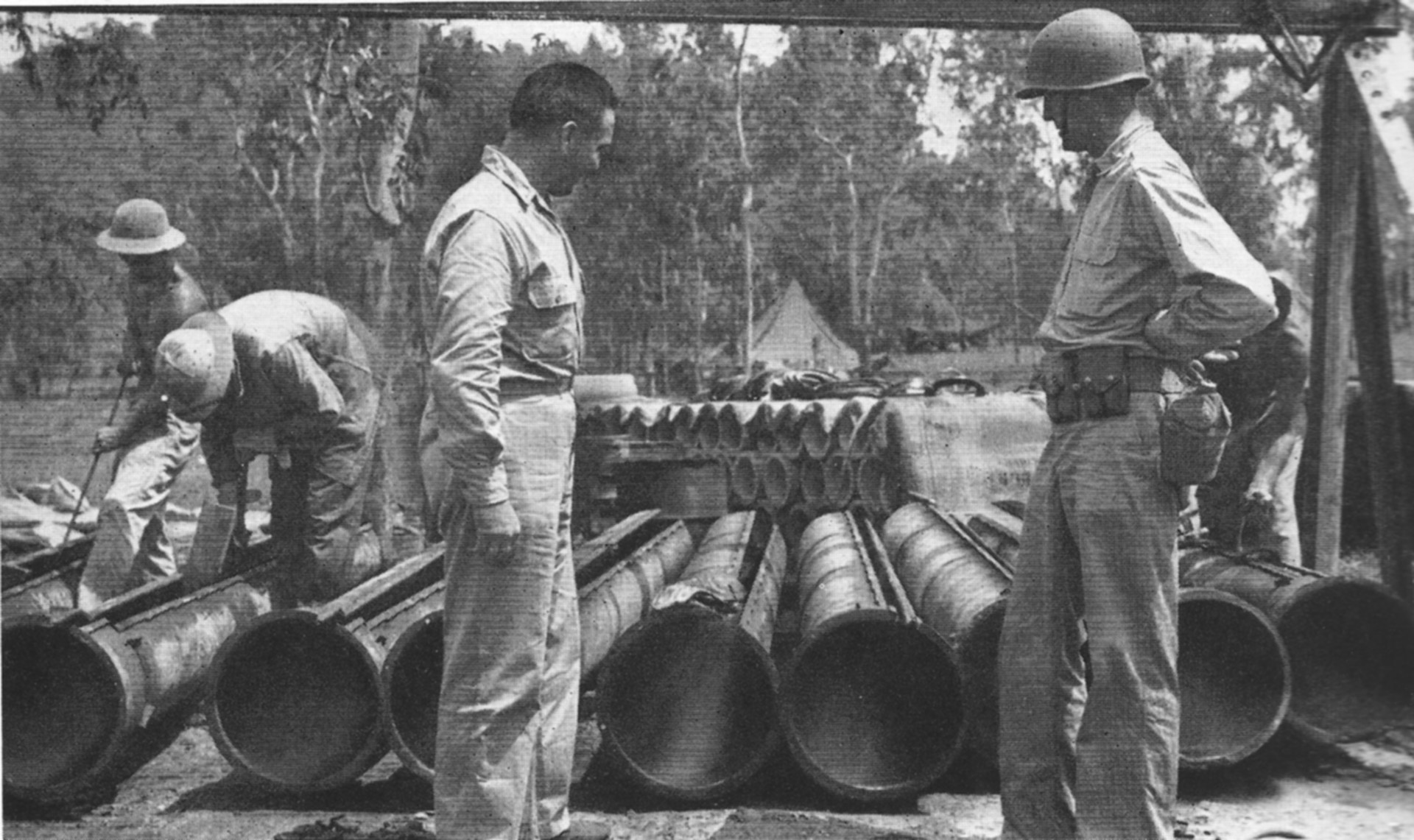
US Army engineers manufacture concrete culvert pipes to alleviate the pipe shortage, watched by Brigadier General Dwight Johns (right)

The depots and airbases depended on an efficient road network, so the engineers gave this a high priority. A major effort was made to bring the roads up to all-weather standard before onset of the 1942 wet season. New roads were also built. One of the first was the By Pass Road, which was designed to divert traffic from the main road, which ran around the south eastern end of Jackson Drome, and was therefore an operational hazard. The By Pass Road ran between Jackson and Wards Dromes, and was later extended to Berry, Schwimmer and Durand Dromes. The opening of the new wharf at Tatana Island in October caused a sudden increase in road traffic, so a new Barune Road was opened in November, providing a loop to Jackson and Wards Dromes. Fortunately, the local red shale contained clay and rock fragments, and when laid on a prepared subgrade and watered, either by sprinklers or rain, became hard like concrete. This could take motor vehicle traffic, although it became dusty when dry and slippery when wet. Surfacing material was obtained from the Nine Mile Quarry. Wood was found to be unsuitable for culverts, as it was quickly destroyed by the action of climate and insects. Oil drums were found to be superior, but they rusted, and using them for culverts depleted the drum supply.

There were no facilities in Port Moresby for the bulk storage of petroleum products, so they were shipped and distributed in 44-gallon drums, as they were known in SWPA, where food and fuel distribution was through the Australian Army, which used the imperial gallon. A shortage of 44-gallon drums developed in late 1942. Some 150,000 went north but only 10,000 returned. New production was ordered from Rheem in Australia, and civilian holders of 44-gallon drums were urged to empty and return them. Unserviceable drums were either repaired by the Bulk Issues Petrol and Oil Depot (BIPOD) or handed over to salvage. A well-organised collection effort was undertaken by the Port Moresby Base Sub Area which resulted in over 20,000 empty drums being returned to Australia in November.

Crucial to road and airfield development was the output of the Nine Mile Quarry. Initially it was run by the 1st Army Troops Company, which installed suspended electric lighting, allowing the quarry to be worked around the clock from 30 April 1942. Companies A and C of the 96th Engineer Battalion took over the running of the quarry in June. In turn, they were relieved by C Company of the 2/1st Pioneer Battalion in November. Work went on in three eight hour shifts per day, seven days a week. The face of the quarry was drilled from the top and dropped to the floor by blasting. Knapping hammers were used to break the stone into small pieces that could be lifted onto trucks by hand. There were two rock crushers on hand; an old model and a modern mobile diesel crusher supplied by the US Army.

== Support of combat operations ==
=== Overland supply ===
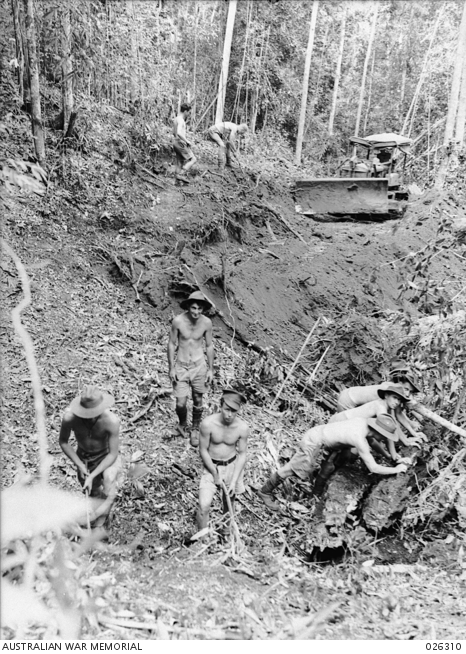
The 2/14th Field Company improves the road from Ilolo

When the campaign began, the Kokoda Track started at McDonald's Corner, just beyond Ilolo. From there, the track slowly rose about 670 metres (2,200 ft) to what later became known as Owers' Corner. The road from Port Moresby was sealed as far as Seven Mile, and from there a gravel surface was laid to provide an all-weather road as far as Sogeri, roughly 51 kilometres (32 mi) from Port Moresby. On 24 June, GHQ queried whether it would be possible to upgrade the track to one that could handle animal transport or, better still, motor vehicles. There were multiple tracks leading to Kokoda, and in addition to the main track, there was interest at New Guinea Force HQ in a route along the Brown River that had been partially surveyed in 1912.

On 5 July, there were 1,140 motor vehicles with New Guinea Force. Of these, 300 had arrived with the garrison in 1941, 120 were local vehicles that had been taken over, and 600 had arrived in April and May. The state of the available motor vehicles at this time was poor. Many of the impressed vehicles were odd types for which spare parts were scarce. Most vehicles had been in constant use, and maintenance had been neglected. Many were missing log books or had never had them, so what maintenance had been performed was uncertain. Moreover, the 30th Brigade had no light aid detachment (LAD) to work on them. Major P. A. Billis, the Deputy Assistant Director of Ordnance Services (DADOS) for Engineering recommended that 200 new vehicles be sent as a matter of urgency. More vehicles arrived with the 7th Division, and the 21st Brigade section of the 2/7th Division Workshop established itself at Ilolo on 19 August, mainly to service engineer equipment used for road work.

Owers' Corner was named after Lieutenant Noel Owers, who was given the task of surveying a new route from Ilolo to Nauro. The project of constructing a jeep track to Nauro was pushed aggressively by the Chief Engineer at New Guinea Force, Brigadier John Main. Lieutenant Colonel Sidney Bleechmore was placed in charge, and was given the 7th and 2/14th Field Companies and a section of the 2/1st Mechanical Equipment Company. Work commenced on 19 August. Removing the trees allowed the sun to dry out the ground, and by adding drainage, a track was created passable by light vehicles, allowing plant and equipment to be brought up. Owers' Corner was reached in early September.

At this point the route Owers surveyed departed from the mule track. The track descended down the ridge on a grade too steep for motor vehicles, so the road then proceeded along the ridge line. The 7th Field Company then encountered 120 metres (6 chains) of rock, which had to be drilled and blasted. The jeep track was abandoned at this point, but work continued on a mule track, which was advanced about 3 kilometres (2 mi) per day until mid-September, when the engineer units were withdrawn to Port Moresby due to the deteriorating tactical situation, with the Japanese closing in on Ioribaiwa. Work resumed on 28 September, but was abandoned in early October. Units working on the road were supplied by pack transport. Improvements to the road allowed 3-ton trucks to reach Owers' Corner on 28 September. The jeeps were then moved to a new line of communications running from Itiki through Subitana.

The 1st Independent Light Horse Troop was a small mounted unit consisting of one officer and twenty other ranks. It was raised at Koitaki on 1 April 1942, using the horses from the station there. It was originally engaged in patrolling and locating crashed aircraft around Port Moresby, but on 26 June it was assigned to the pack transport role on the Kokoda Track. A remount sub section of six men impressed mules, horses and pack saddlery from the plantations around Sogeri, and rounded up and broke brumbies from the Bootless Inlet area. It was found that the mules were best-suited for the task, with the brumbies next. Because the tracks were narrow, they trained the animals to walk in single file, led by a mounted rider at the front and trailed by one at the rear of the column. Each animal carried 73 kilograms (160 lb) of stores, which were packed in bags to facilitate their transfer to Papuan carriers. The Goldie River was bridged on 2 July, and the mule track was extended to Uberi. Pack transport hauled 4,770 kilograms (10,520 lb) of supplies in June, 19,160 kilograms (42,240 lb) between 3 and 16 July, 85,490 kilograms (188,480 lb) between 17 July and 16 August, and 34,000 kilograms (76,000 lb) between 17 and 29 August.

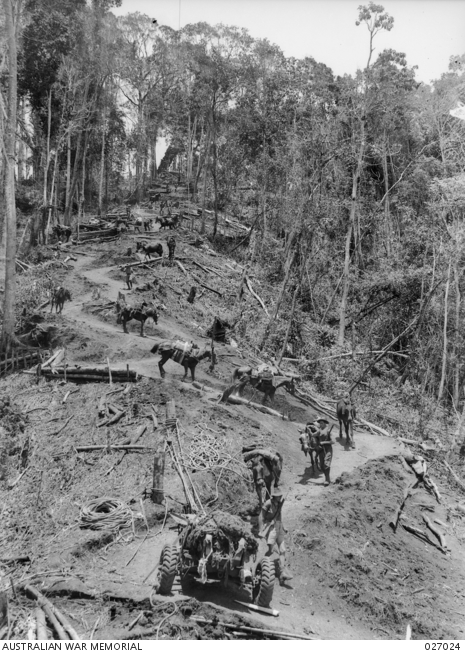
Men leading pack horses and mules loaded with supplies down the precipitous curving track from the end of the road down into the Uberi Valley. In the foreground is a 25-pounder gun that is being man-hauled through the valley to Imita Ridge.

The steep descent near Owers' Corner to the Goldie River crossing at Uberi involved a steep ascent for the animals on the return trip. The 2/6th Field Company constructed a flying fox, which went into operation on 26 September. Descending 120 metres (400 ft), it was 370 metres (1,200 ft) long, with an intermediate station. The empty tackle was returned by the weight of the cargo, which was up to 140 kilograms (300 lb). In late August, the 1st Light Horse Troop was reorganised as a pack transport section, with six sub sections. One prepared the loads, weighing them to ensure that there was 36 kilograms (80 lb) on each side. The other five were each under the command of a non-commissioned officer, with five other ranks, three riding horses and ten to twelve pack horses or mules. With a call for more supplies to be delivered, the remount unit was recalled, and 29 other ranks were added from the 55th Infantry Battalion in September, bringing the total strength to one officer, 81 other ranks, 39 mules and 63 horses, and allowing four more sub sections to be formed. The 1st Independent Light Horse Troop struggled with epidemics of strangles and infectious nasal catarrh among horses imported from Australia, and the saddlery became increasingly worn until 60 new saddles arrived from Australia in September.

Meanwhile, the 1st Pack Transport Company was formed at Royal Park in Melbourne on 25 August. It had entrained for Queensland on 25 September, and arrived in Port Moresby on 7 October. In late October it began relieving the 1st Light Horse Troop. By the end of October, the 1st Pack Transport Company had one officer and 110 other ranks with 43 mules and 135 horses working on the track. The 1st Light Horse Troop was relieved on 5 November, and was reorganised as the New Guinea Force Pack Transport Company. It was later renamed the 7th Pack Transport Company. In all, some 643,330 kilograms (1,418,310 lb) of supplies were moved forward of the jeephead by animal transport.

The acting Commander, 7th Division Australian Army Service Corps (AASC), Lieutenant Colonel Gordon Richardson, assumed control of logistics on the track on 10 September. Supplies were then brought from the Base Supply Depots at Sogeri and Ilolo to Newton's Depot in 3-ton trucks by the 2/5th AASC Company. The 2/4th AASC Company moved them by jeep to the roadhead at Owers' Corner. The flying fox was used to take them to the floor of the Goldie River Valley, from whence the 1st Independent Light Horse Troop carried them to Uberi. From there, they were carried on the backs of Papuan porters, known as carriers. If there were more stores than the animals could carry, they would assist with that too.

Since the number of pack animals and carriers was limited, the requirements for stores and supplies of all types, including rations, ammunition, ordnance, signals equipment and medical supplies, were submitted to 7th Division headquarters, which allocated movement priorities. One of Richardson's first actions was to obtain more saddlery for the pack horses. He also acquired five more American jeeps to augment the five that had been working the jeep track. The original five were found to be in poor condition, and needed overhaul. While the 25th Infantry Brigade was conducting operations in the Imita Ridge area, the carry was short, and despite the fact that there were no suitable air dropping zones, the supply situation was good. As the Australians began advancing toward Kokoda again in October, the supply line became steadily longer, and the demand for carriers more acute.

From Uberi, the track ran to Ioribaiwa. The first 5 kilometres (3 mi) involved a gruelling 370-metre (1,200 ft) climb. Sappers cut steps to create what became known as the "Golden Stairs". In many ways this made it harder, as it forced the walker to lift his feet higher. This was especially so for the Papuans who were the most frequent users of the track, and who were not used to stairs. The technique would not be used in 1943. The Papuan carriers moved supplies forward from Uberi, often under arduous conditions. The pre-war plantation economy of the Australian territories of Papua and New Guinea was based on a system of indentured labour. On 15 June 1942, Morris issued the Employment of Natives Order under the National Security (Emergency Control) Regulations. This provided for the conscription of Papuan labour to support the Australian war effort.

About 800 Papuan civilians were working in the Port Moresby area in April 1942. Responding to increasing calls for carriers, ANGAU conscripted 2,033 Papuans in June, 3,354 in July, and 4,947 in August. On 9 October, ANGAU was maintaining 9,270 Papuan workers. Casting such a wide net created problems. Although all spoke Motuan, the prevalence of different dialects meant that they could not all communicate with one another. ANGAU representatives sorted them into groups who spoke the same dialect. Taking away so many able-bodied men caused hardship for their families and villages, as jobs they normally performed went undone, and food production fell away. However, atrocities committed by the Japanese against Papuan and New Guinea civilians proved a persuasive recruiting tool.

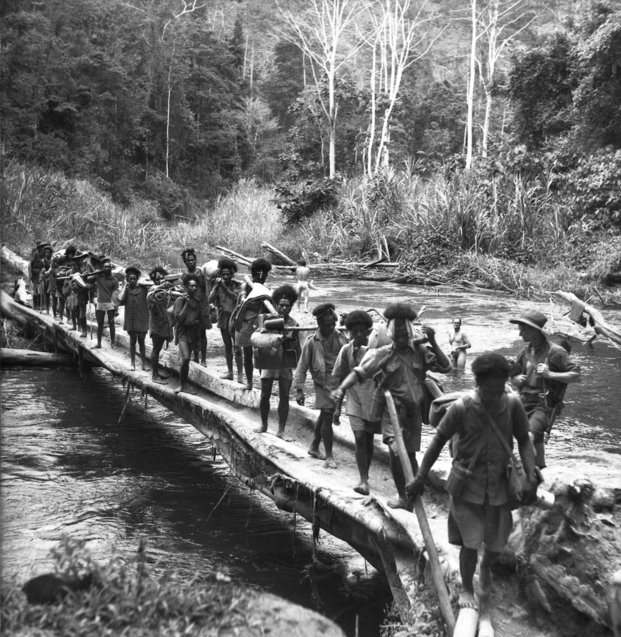
Papuan carriers in Australian service crossing a river between Nauro and Menari in October 1942

A carrier could carry about 13 days' worth of food, and traversing the track took eight days. A carrier load was assessed at 18 kilograms (40 lb), but the water-logged wrapping caused it to weigh more. Since the carriers could not carry more, ANGAU had to take this into account when preparing the loads. The initial movement of the 39th Infantry Battalion to Kokoda was supported by 600 carriers under Lieutenant H. T. (Bert) Kienzle from ANGAU. Along the track, Kienzle and Sergeant Major Maga of the Royal Papuan Constabulary established way stations, which they stocked with food gathered locally, and were manned by ANGAU, who were responsible for both the carriers and the stores.

The 39th Infantry Battalion was able to travel light because it did not have to carry heavy stores or equipment. Morris arranged for an old Thursday Island schooner, the Gili Gili, to take 20 tonnes (20 long tons) of stores and equipment by sea. These included Vickers machine guns and Lewis guns. Gili Gili departed Port Moresby on 4 July, and arrived at Buna on 19 July. Captain Thomas Grahamslaw, the local ANGAU District Officer, arranged for 1,500 carriers to take the stores to Kokoda.

The Allied retreat from Kokoda in August and September was a trying time for the carriers, who were pushed to their limit, hauling supplies up to the front, and then carrying the wounded back. Not only did it take eight men to move each casualty, but they were far slower, taking three times as long to traverse the track. It was intended that there would be separate carrier lines for supply and casualty evacuation, but this could not be adhered to. Each non-walking casualty meant three fewer bundles of supplies delivered per day for each carrier employed evacuating wounded. By 30 August, all the carriers had been drafted into evacuating the wounded except those reserved for carrying the 3-inch mortars. The retreat and the sight of the wounded depressed the morale of the carriers, who repeatedly asked Kienzle why the Australians could not defeat the Japanese.

On 13 September, there were 310 carriers working in the forward area, and 860 at Uberi. Overwork and illness took its toll on them. Captain Geoffrey (Doc) Vernon, a deaf veteran of the Great War, was sent by ANGAU as medical officer for the carriers. He was greatly disturbed at what he saw in August:

The condition of our carriers at Eora Creek caused me more concern than that of the wounded ... Overwork, overloading (principally by soldiers who dumped their packs and even rifles on top of the carriers' own burdens), exposure, cold and underfeeding were the common lot. Every evening scores of carriers came in, slung their loads down and lay exhausted on the ground; the immediate prospect before them was grim, a meal that consisted of only rice and none too much of that, and a night of shivering discomfort for most as there were only enough blankets to issue one to every two men.

Newspaper reports, photographs, and newsreel films soon appeared of Papuan carriers tending to Australian wounded while struggling over towering mountains and across raging torrents of rivers. This produced an outpouring of gratitude among the civilian population in Australia, who called them "Fuzzy Wuzzy Angels"; it would affect the way that Australians viewed their neighbour for many decades to come.

=== Air supply ===
The first air transport unit in SWPA was the Air Transport Command, a United States Army Air Forces (USAAF) unit which was formed at RAAF Base Amberley in Queensland on 28 January 1942. It was equipped with five C-53s originally bound for the Philippines, and two B-18s and a C-39 that had escaped from there. Only two of the original 14 pilots were fully qualified on transports; the rest had to be retrained. Of the 19 airmen, 12 were trained as aircrew members. It was redesignated the US 21st Transport Squadron on 3 April. On the same date, the US 22nd Transport Squadron was formed at Essendon Airport in Victoria with former Royal Netherlands Indies Airways (KNILM) and Royal Netherlands East Indies Army Air Force (RNEIAAF) aircraft that had arrived in Australia from Java. The two squadrons were redesignated the 21st and 22nd Troop Carrier Squadrons on 26 July.

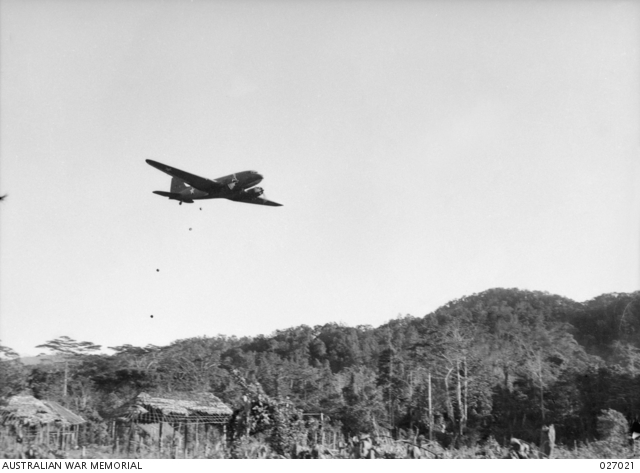
Dropping food supplies on a cleared space at Nauro village during the advance of the 25th Infantry Brigade over the Owen Stanley Range

On 21 May, the 21st Transport Squadron had a B-18, two C-39s, a C-47, three C-53s, two ex-KNILM DC-2s, two ex-KNILM DC-3s, three ex-KNILM DC-5s, two ex-KNILM L14s, and three O-47s. The 22nd Transport Squadron had a B-17, two C-39s, a C-47, a B-18, an ex-KNILM L-14, and eleven ex-RNEIAAF C-56s. The 21st Transport Squadron flew its first mission in New Guinea on 22 May, flying from Port Moresby to Wau and Bulolo with supplies for Kanga Force, the small Australian garrison there. Thereafter missions were frequently flown; but the two squadrons were still based in Queensland, not Port Moresby, and would not relocate there until the following year. The RAAF formed four transport squadrons in February and March 1942, and No. 33 Squadron RAAF began flying a regular passenger and freight service from Townsville to Port Moresby on 5 March. It received Avro Ansons in September and a detachment was sent to Port Moresby the following month. Aircraft of No. 36 Squadron RAAF also made occasional trips to New Guinea in 1942, and twenty RAAF pilots were seconded to US troop carrier squadrons.

The difficulties of operating in New Guinea soon became apparent. Two attempts to reach Wau on 23 May 1942 failed due to bad weather. On 26 May, five transports were flying to Wau when they were attacked by 16 Mitsubishi A6M Zeroes, which were engaged by the escorting P-39s of the 35th, 36th and 39th Fighter Squadrons. The transports delivered their loads successfully, but one P-39 was lost. The transports always took off in daylight; weather reports were not available before dawn, and the fighter escort could not operate in darkness. Weather was a constant hazard over the Owen Stanley Range, and clouds could build up faster than an aircraft could climb. Poor flying weather, either over Port Moresby or over the target, could ground the transports for a week or more at a time.

Weather and rough airstrips increased the amount of maintenance required to keep the planes flying. So too did the climate. The high humidity encouraged the growth of fungus which shorted out electrical components; metal surfaces were subject to corrosion; and lubrication oils evaporated in the high temperatures. Critical spare parts were often out of stock, and their delivery was an important role of the intra-theatre air transport. Availability did not just mean the transports; there was also the fighter escorts, which were normally based at another field. If they could not fly, or were required for another mission, then the transports could not fly. For planning purposes, a C-39 planeload was reckoned at 950 kilograms (2,100 lb) with 2,600 litres (700 US gal) of fuel, while that of the larger C-53 was reckoned at 2,300 kilograms (5,000 lb) with 3,110 litres (822 US gal) of fuel; but loading charts were not available in 1942, and aircraft were sometimes overloaded.

The first air transport mission to the Kokoda front was flown on 26 July, when a DC-3 from the 21st Troop Carrier Squadron landed 15 troops of the 39th Infantry Battalion and some stores. A C-53 followed that afternoon with another 15 men and some stores. The flight time to Kokoda was about twenty minutes. An air supply run the following day by a C-53 and a DC-2 found the airstrip barricaded. The barricades were removed, but the aircraft were recalled by a radio message that the Kokoda Drome could not be held. The loss of the airstrip meant a switch to air dropping supplies. An aircraft was sent that afternoon, but was recalled. On 28 July, a DC-5, a DC-3 and a DC-2 dropped supplies near Kokoda. Three transports dropped supplies near Kagi on 29 July, and one on 30 July. No more missions were flown until 6 August.

Morris formed a good working relationship with the air commander in New Guinea, Brigadier General Martin F. Scanlon, but in early August Scanlon was replaced by Brigadier General Ennis C. Whitehead, who sent the two DC-3-type transport aircraft back to Australia. By 18 August, some 140,000 kilograms (300,000 lb) of vital supplies had piled up in Townsville, awaiting air transport to Port Moresby. This left only a single DC-2 at Port Moresby; a Lodestar arrived on 8 August. An urgent message from Morris to Advance LHQ resulted in GHQ despatching four DC-3-type aircraft to Port Moresby. Advance LHQ reminded New Guinea Force of the procedure for requesting transport aircraft, to which Colonel Frederick Chilton, the GSO1 at New Guinea Force HQ, protested that it was "too slow and has already cost us Kokoda".

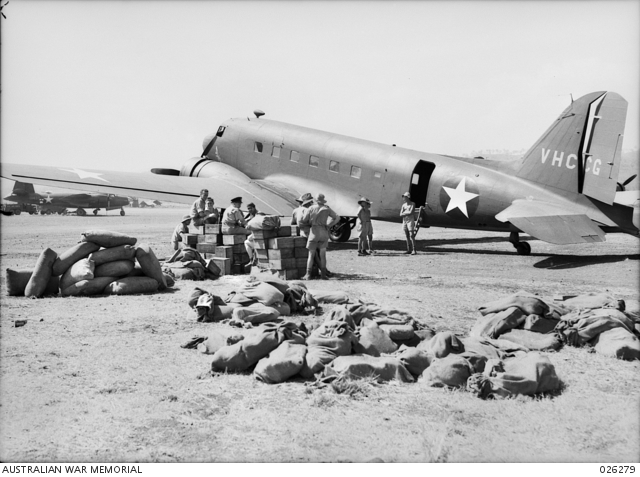
A DC-2 is loaded with supplies for the troops at Kokoda on 19 August 1942

Techniques for air dropping had yet to be developed. Following the loss of the airstrip at Kokoda, the AAF concluded that the only way to get supplies to A Company, 39th Infantry Battalion in the Kokoda area was to adopt a suggestion from the Army to put them in fighter drop tanks. The tanks were slit, along the bottom, and they were filled with supplies. The first attempt on 11 August was called off due to bad weather, but four fighters dropped a total of 910 kilograms (2,000 lb) on 12 August. By then it was too late; the area was in Japanese hands. A forward supply dump was established at Myola, in a dry lake bed that Kienzle found on 3 August. The lake bed was flat and treeless, making it a good candidate for a supply drop zone. Several days of good weather after 9 August allowed the transport aircraft to concentrate on dropping at Myola.

When he assumed command, Rowell was informed that 25 days' supply of food and ammunition for 2,000 men was stored there, but on checking it was found that there were only four days' rations, with two days' reserves held forward of Myola. The official historian, Dudley McCarthy, suggested that "the rations were never dropped at all, and that the explanation lay in faulty work by an inexperienced staff". In his memoirs, Rowell maintained that the missing rations had been sent, and must have fallen outside the target area. On 21 August, Kienzle discovered a second, much larger, dry lake bed at Myola. The two lake beds came to be called Myola 1 and 2, but the maps issued to air crews showed only one. Drops may have been made at the wrong one.

But there are other explanations for the missing rations. The inexperienced New Guinea Force staff assumed that the supplies they despatched would arrive, but this was far from the case with air dropping, the techniques for which had yet to be properly developed. Kienzle picked what he thought were good drop zones, but the air crews sometimes found them restricted or dangerous. The aircraft had to fly low over the drop zone, at about 60 to 90 metres (200 to 300 ft), and slow, at about 190 kilometres per hour (120 mph). They had to take the wind into account, as it might cause parachuted packages to miss the drop zone. The load would be placed in the doorway, and three or four men would push it out when the pilot gave the signal. The pilot would fly level or with the nose slightly down, so that cargo would not hit the tail of the aircraft. The pilot would retract the landing gear if it was down, and climb to gain altitude. Multiple passes over the drop zone might be required. Heavy loads were not practical for air dropping missions, since the aircraft had to arrive low and slow over the drop zone, but higher speed was required for greater weight. Nor could an overloaded aircraft climb or dive quickly. The 21st and 22nd Troop Carrier Squadrons were still based in Queensland and not at Port Moresby, so the aircrew were there on short rotations. Their learning process was therefore fitful and slow. Men from various Army and RAAF units assisted the aircrew in the task of pushing stores out of the aircraft.

Packaging was primitive and inadequate in 1942, even for normal handling under New Guinea conditions. Cardboard boxes disintegrated, cans rusted, and wooden boxes rotted or were eaten by insects. Parachutes for air dropping were in short supply. Orders for parachutes were placed in Australia, the United States and India. A request for 5,000 cargo parachutes with containers was made to Washington on 21 July. On 22 September it was decided to send 1,000 without containers by air, while the rest went by sea. Due to the shortage of parachutes, most supplies had to be "free-dropped"—dropped without parachutes—so the rate of breakage was high. As the contents of the packaging usually burst, they were encased in two or more sacks, the outer being much larger than the inner, so it could contain the contents when the inner burst, and prevent them from scattering. Three layers was found necessary. Items such as sacks and blankets were preferred as packaging, as these were useful to the troops. About 12,000 blankets were used in the five weeks up to 12 October. The earlier adoption of blankets as packaging would not only have saved supplies from breakage, but would also have increased the volume of supplies delivered over the track, as thousands of blankets were sent by carrier. Without a well-organised effort, less than half of what was dropped was recovered with perhaps 70 per cent of that still usable.

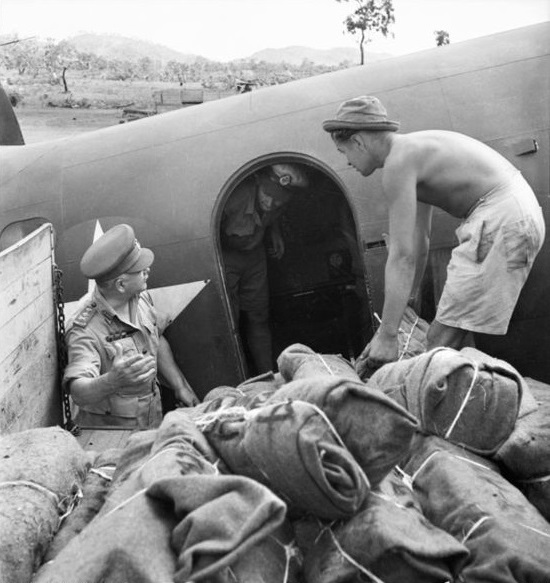
Loading a plane with ammunition wrapped in blankets in December 1942. General Sir Thomas Blamey talks to the loaders.

On 16 August, Whitehead promised to deliver 2,700 kilograms (6,000 lb) of ammunition, 3,400 kilograms (7,500 lb) of rations and 680 kilograms (1,500 lb) of supplies, a total of 6,800 kilograms (15,000 lb), to Maroubra Force daily to maintain three battalions in the Kokoda area; but the following day there was a disastrous air raid on Jackson Drome. A large force of Japanese 25 Mitsubishi G4M (Betty) bombers escorted by 22 Zero fighters reached Port Moresby undetected. No air raid warning was sounded and no fighters took off to intercept before the attack. They caught ten Martin B-26 Marauders of the 22nd Bombardment Group on the ground armed and fuelled. Four were destroyed, as were three transports of the 21st and 22nd Troop Carrier Squadrons, a DC-5 and two C-56s. Another eight aircraft were badly damaged: four B-26s, a C-39, a C-49 and two C-53s. The two C-53s were patched up and flown back to Australia for more extensive repairs.

Rowell pressed Blamey for more aircraft. He wanted to build up 20 days' reserves over and above Maroubra Force's daily requirement of 6,800 kilograms (15,000 lb), which would require the movement of another 91,000 kilograms (200,000 lb) of stores and ammunition. Even spread over 20 days, this would require an additional 2,000 carriers. Blamey went to MacArthur, who arranged for six A-24 Dauntless dive bombers, a B-17 and two transports to be made available. MacArthur reminded Blamey that:

With these planes it is estimated that a minimum of 20,000 pounds of supplies per day can be delivered to Kagi and Wau. There are available in Australia only thirty transport planes at the present time. Of these an average of not more than 50 per cent are available at any one time. Air supply must necessarily be considered an emergency rather than a normal means of supply. Consequently every effort should be made by the GOC NGF to develop other means of supply.

MacArthur and Kenney did prevail on Washington to provide more troop carrier aircraft. In July, SWPA was given a high priority for transport aircraft, with six additional squadrons earmarked to bring it up to two groups. They were scheduled to arrive in November and December, but their movement was expedited, and the first new squadron, the 6th Troop Carrier Squadron, reached Port Moresby on 14 October. Part of the 33rd Troop Carrier Squadron was held up in the South Pacific Area, which also had urgent needs. In the meantime, ten DC-3s were converted into C-49s and C-50s at the Sacramento Air Depot and flown out to Australia, where they were allocated to the 21st Troop Carrier Squadron in September. Ten C-60 Lodestars were also despatched, which joined the 22nd Troop Carrier Squadron.

When the 17 August raid occurred, two battalions of the 21st Infantry Brigade under Brigadier Arnold Potts were moving forward to retake Kokoda and prepare for operations to recapture Buna. Upon being informed by Potts that only 10,000 instead of the anticipated 40,000 rations were at Myola, Rowell took immediate steps to ease the supply situation. He held back the third battalion of Potts' brigade, the 2/27th Infantry Battalion, and ordered Allen to return the 39th Infantry Battalion to Port Moresby. Kienzle had 933 Papuans working between Myola and Isurava. Not all were carriers; some collected supplies from the drop area, and others were engaged in other work, such as building huts and shelters. Rowell turned down a request from Potts for 800 more carriers to move supplies forward from Myola, allowing him only another 300 from the Port Moresby-Myola carrier line until stocks at Myola were built up. Potts' role was to be a defensive one until then, and the 2/14th and 2/16th were to remain in the Myola area. On 23 August, an aircraft dropped rations, medical supplies, two 3-inch mortars and 120 mortar bombs. Another four loads were dropped the following day before clouds closed in over Myola. Allen reported that 5,000 emergency rations and 1,500 balanced rations had been dropped, along with 2,030 kilograms (4,480 lb) of biscuits and 1,900 kilograms (4,200 lb) of other ration components, and 21,000 quinine tablets. Some 237,000 rounds of .303 ammunition for the rifles, 140,000 rounds of .45 for the Thompson submachine guns, and 1,050 hand grenades had been sent to Myola.

The Japanese landing at Milne Bay on 25 August caused Allen to retain the 2/27th Infantry Battalion in the Port Moresby area in case of a seaborne attack, and he ordered Potts to expedite the return of the 39th Infantry Battalion. As late as 25 August, Potts still intended to recapture Kokoda with the 2/14th, but his plans were overtaken by events. The Japanese attacked at Isurava, and although his force, which still included the 39th Battalion, slightly outnumbered the Japanese, Potts was defeated. Myola was lost on 5 September, along with 10,000 rations. In his report, Potts noted that due to the delay caused by the shortage of supplies at Myola, "at no time were the 2/14th and 2/16th Australian Infantry Battalions ever intact and available for a concerted operation, wholly and solely due to delays occasioned by supply".

Hamstrung by the original failure to build up supplies ahead of the Japanese attack, the 21st Brigade had then found it virtually impossible to sustain either offensive or defensive actions because of the shortage of carriers to transport supplies; its experience showed that although it was possible for aircraft to drop supplies in order to build up a supply dump in the mountains, the air supply effort was futile without enough carriers to deliver supplies forward over the mountain tracks. When subsequently heavy demand for medical evacuations robbed Potts of the majority of his carriers that had been allocated for supply operations, he could only retreat. Without reinforcement carriers, Maroubra Force never stood a hope of regaining the initiative.

From 16 September, the AASC officer at each depot reported the stock levels at 18:00 each day. Demands for supplies were forwarded from the Q Branch at New Guinea Force headquarters to the Deputy Director of Supplies and Transport. This was matched up with the number and type of available aircraft. Trucks drew the stores from the depots, where they were packaged and prepared for dropping, and took them to the aerodrome, usually Jackson or Kila. As time went by, standard load lists were developed. Packages of rations were "balanced"–arranged so they contained a complete set of commodities—so that the loss of some packages would not result in surpluses of one commodity and shortages of another. One truck was allocated to each plane, plus one additional truck in case another aircraft became available. Each plane would be loaded with the contents of one truck. Planes might return with some or all of their load, or not take off at all. At the end of the day, stores remaining on aircraft would be loaded back onto the trucks, and would be returned to the depots. Some 82,000 kilograms (180,779 lb) were despatched by air supply in August, 139,061 kilograms (306,576 lb) in September, and 685,707 kilograms (1,511,726 lb) in October. New drop zones were developed around Efogi, Nauro and Manari. Myola was recaptured on 14 October, and Myola 1 and 2 were developed as drop zones.

== Medical support ==
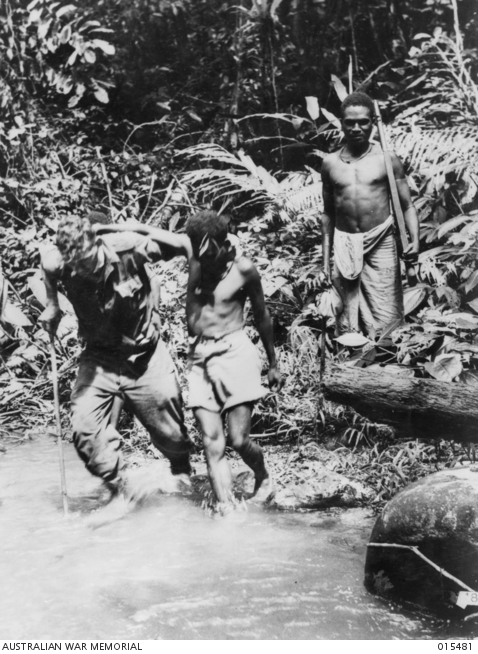
A Papuan assists Private Jerry Cronin to cross a creek after Cronin had been wounded in a clash against the Japanese.

The first medical unit to arrive was the 3rd Field Ambulance, which left Adelaide on 25 December 1941, and moved into the Murray Barracks in Port Moresby on 3 January 1942. The base hospital became the 46th Camp Hospital, and moved to King's Hollow, a site on the Laloki River 34 kilometres (21 mi) from Port Moresby. A Red Cross convalescent home at Rouna became the 113th Convalescent Depot. On 3 June the hospital ship Wanganella brought the 14th Field Ambulance and the 5th Casualty Clearing Station.

The 2/9th General Hospital arrived from South Australia on the hospital ship Manunda on 23 August. It moved to a site at Rouna, 27 kilometres (17 mi) from Port Moresby. It was the only general hospital in New Guinea until the 2/5th General Hospital arrived in January 1943. Due to the prospect that Port Moresby might fall, it was sent without its nurses or Australian Army Medical Women's Service physiotherapists. Staffed as a 600-bed hospital, it held 732 patients on 6 October. Its commanding officer, Colonel A. H. Green, suggested that it be expanded to a 1,200-bed hospital, or that another 600-bed hospital be sent from Australia. Authorisation was given to expand to 800 beds on 29 September, and the nurses and physiotherapists were sent. Between when it opened in September and the end of December, the 2/9th General Hospital admitted 10,083 patients.

Malaria was a concern, as it was endemic in New Guinea. There was no plasmoquine to cure it, and the main drug used to combat it was quinine, which was not fully effective. The recommended dosage of 0.65 grams (10 gr) per day was found to be insufficient to give protection against the disease in highly malarious areas. Quinine was also in short supply, as Java, which had been overrun by the Japanese, accounted for 90 per cent of the world's supply. Moreover, many failed to take the required dose with regularity, insect repellents were not available or not used, protective clothing was not issued to all the troops, and some still went around at night in short sleeves and shorts.

Colonel Neil Hamilton Fairley, the Australian Army's Director of Medicine, and Major Ian Murray Mackerras visited Port Moresby in June 1942. Both were experts on tropical medicine. They noted that the garrison had suffered 1,184 cases of malaria, an infection rate of 149 per thousand. They recommended that to conserve quinine, men could be taken off it during the dry season, and observed for relapses. Fortunately, the climate in the Owen Stanley Range was not favourable to mosquitoes, and most cases were relapses by men infected in Port Moresby or Syria. Potts therefore decided on 24 August that anti-malarial precautions were no longer necessary.

An epidemic of dysentery broke out on the Kokoda Track that threatened the entire force. Some 1,200 casualties, mostly dysentery, reached Ilolo in September. Simple hygiene procedures involving the disposal of rubbish and excrement were required, but were neglected in the early stages of the campaign. Lieutenant Colonel Edward Ford, the Assistant Director of Pathology at New Guinea Force headquarters, arranged for supplies of a new drug, sulphaguanidine, to be shipped from Australia. The widespread use of a scarce drug was a gamble, as it used up all the stocks in Australia, but one that paid off; it arrested the epidemic, and allowed sick men to travel, thereby saving lives. When the Australians advanced on Kokoda in October, special details constructed latrines, buried the dead, and, in extreme cases, burned villages that the Japanese had fouled beyond redemption.

Scrub typhus is spread by mites that live in the soil. Soldiers walking through mite-infested areas were fairly safe, but if they sat or lay down or stood still for long enough, the mites could attach themselves. Although the incidence of typhus was much less than that of malaria or dysentery, it was more lethal. Of 2,839 Australian servicemen affected in SWPA, 9.05% died. Scrub itch, a skin irritation caused by mite bites, was a more common but far less serious ailment. Tinea was also a problem, due to the inability of men to keep their clothes or boots dry, or to wash them. A shortage of fresh fruit and vegetables caused vitamin-deficiency-related problems. To save weight and simplify the distribution of rations, the 7th Division staff cut back the number of commodities in the ration from thirteen (bully beef, biscuits, tea, sugar, salt, dried fruit, jam, butter, milk, cheese, tinned fruit, tinned vegetables and bacon) to just the first six. Inevitably, both the troops and the carriers began to suffer from vitamin deficiencies as well as exhaustion and illness. To supplement the carriers' vitamin B intake, marmite was air dropped for them, but only 27 kilograms (60 lb) was available.

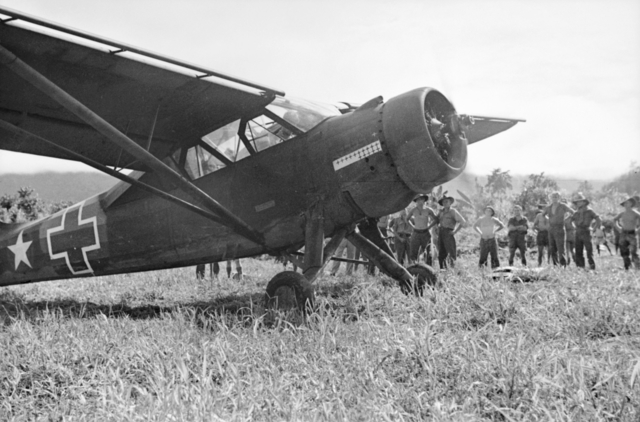
A Stinson L-1 Vigilant air ambulance operating at Kokoda, November 1942. The aircraft is evacuating two sick or wounded Australian soldiers to Port Moresby from the Main Dressing Station (MDS) of the 2/4th Field Ambulance near the airstrip.

Major J. R. Magarey, the Senior Medical Officer of the 2/6th Field Ambulance, initially instituted an unusual casualty evacuation plan, under which casualties were evacuated forward instead of rearward, as Potts expected to be able to recapture the airstrip at Kokoda, which would allow casualties to be flown out. In forward areas where the carriers could not go, the men of the Papuan Infantry Battalion pitched in, making four teams of stretcher bearers available. During Potts' retreat to Ioribaiwa, casualty evacuation had to be along the track. Medical care was available at each way station. Magarey recalled that:

It was necessary to be quite ruthless in this respect. Every man who could possibly walk had to; and over and over again men arriving at medical posts could be given only short rests and then had to be pushed on again. The fortitude and cheerfulness shown by the majority of these men was beyond praise, and the feats of endurance performed by some of the wounded, particularly those with wounds of the lower limbs, were almost incredible.

War correspondent Osmar White saw wounded men on the track:

After leaving Menari we met two wounded men coming out from Kokoda and Deniki—men of the 39th Battalion. One had been shot through the foot, the other through the left eye. The bullet-had passed obliquely and shallowly through his skull from just above the cheek bone and emerged behind the ear. The pair had walked 113 miles in 16 days. They expected to reach the roadhead in another five.

Those with more serious injuries had to be carried down the track. The usual decision as to whether it was safe to move someone was simplified by the Japanese, who killed all the wounded they encountered. Only those near death were abandoned. Casualties were held at the aid posts and dressing stations until they could walk, or the Japanese threatened. It took eight or ten Papuan carriers to move each man. Army stretchers rotted and fell apart; the Papuans improvised stretchers from blankets, copra bags and timber cut along the track. The pace of the withdrawal was dictated by the rate at which casualties could be evacuated.

When Myola was recaptured in October, a Main Dressing Station (MDS) was established there, manned by the 2/4th Field Ambulance and a surgical team from the 2/9th General Hospital. On 1 November, 438 patients were held at Myola. Three days later, Kokoda was back in Australian hands and an MDS established there. It was hoped that aircraft could land at Myola and evacuate the sick and wounded, but Myola was 2,000 metres (6,500 ft) above sea level, and the pilots reported that a fully loaded aircraft would not be able to take off or land at that altitude, and would have trouble clearing the surrounding hills. Risking the precious transports seemed inadvisable. Five light aircraft were made available: three Stinson L-1 Vigilants, a De Havilland DH.50, and a Ford Trimotor. Two Stinsons evacuated 35 patients, and the Ford another eight from Myola, but the Ford and a Stinson crashed while attempting to land at the Port Moresby end of the lake bed, which had become soft after recent rains, on 22 and 24 November respectively. Over time, more than 200 patients recovered sufficiently to return to their units. Walking wounded were sent down the track, while those unable to walk were carried to Kokoda by Papuan carriers, and flown out from there. The last seven walking cases left for Ilolo on 16 December, and the last four stretcher cases for Kokoda on 18 December; the MDS at Myola closed the following day.

== Outcome ==
The Australian Army had entered the Second World War with inadequate resources due to severe cutbacks at the hands of conservative governments in the 1920s and 1930s. This was compounded by a lack of interest and appreciation of logistics on the part of its civilian and military leadership. There was an assumption that the Australian Army would form part of an expeditionary force that would fight overseas in a larger British force. This was indeed the case in the Great War, and again in the Second World War in the Middle East and Malaya, but not in SWPA, where the Australian Army had to provide not only its own logistic support but its Allies' as well.

In an environment where motor transport could not operate, the Australian Army was forced to rely on air transport and native carriers, two modes of transportation that it had never used before. The Australian Army had many lessons to learn, but it proved capable of adapting to the circumstances it found itself in. The fighting along the Kokoda Track was but the start of the effort to drive the Japanese from New Guinea that would continue in 1943.

John Coates, a Chief of the General Staff and an historian of the New Guinea campaign wrote that:

Of all the campaigns of the Second World War that can reasonably claim to have been fought on a logistic shoestring, New Guinea ranks high. The country's relative isolation, inhospitable terrain, enervating and malarious climate, and underdeveloped infrastructure meant that the maintenance and re-supply of military forces presented a continuing challenge. After a series of false starts, the Allies generally overcame their logistic difficulties; the Japanese did not. Therein lay the most important single factor in the campaign.
