= HMAS Potrero =

History

Australia
- Name: Potrero
- Builder: Lars Halvorsen, Neutral Bay
- Yard number: 188
- Launched: 1937

History

Australia
- Name: HMAS Potrero (FY36)

General characteristics
- Class & type: Ketch
- Tonnage: 78 gross register tonnage, 46 net register tonnage
- Length: 70 ft (21 m)

HMAS Potrero was an auxiliary vessel operated by the Royal Australian Navy (RAN) during World War II. She was launched in 1937 by Lars Halvorsen, Neutral Bay, Sydney, Australia.

== Operational history ==
During World War II, HMAS Potrero operated along the New Guinea coastline. On 29 August 1942, the Imperial Japanese Navy submarine Ro-33 torpedoed the motor vessel MV Malaita while Malaita was returning to Cairns, Queensland, Australia, after delivering troops and supplies to Port Moresby, New Guinea. Although listing 10 degrees to starboard, Malaita remained afloat, and was taken in tow by the motor vessel MV Matafele and HMAS Potrero. Their escort, the destroyer HMAS Arunta, picked up an asdic contact on Ro-33, and delivered a series of depth-charge attacks that sank her.
