= Naval Base Port Moresby =

World War 2 base in Papua New Guinea

- Port Moresby, New Guinea
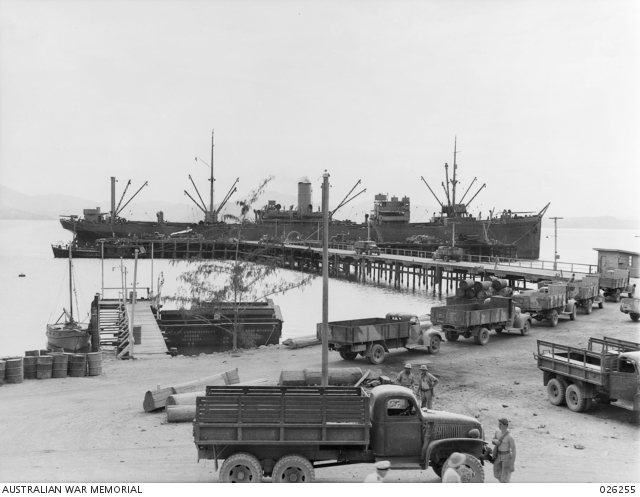
- A cargo ship being unloaded at the wharf in Port Moresby

Location
- Location of Naval Base Port Moresby
- Coordinates: 9.429287°S 147.109722°E

Site history
- Built: 1942
- In use: 1942-1945
- Battles/wars: Battle of New Guinea

Naval Base Port Moresby was a United States Navy base built during World War II at the city of Port Moresby on Papua New Guinea. The US Navy built a communication center and advance base headquarters for the US Seventh Fleet to support the Pacific War in 1943. The base was part of the New Guinea campaign.

== History ==
Port Moresby is a tropical city on the southeast coast of New Guinea Island. Port Moresby had good Fleet anchorage in a protected port that is 5 miles long by 3 miles wide, with a sand and clay seafloor at Fairfax Harbor-Moresby Harbor. Base construction started on June 20, 1943 with the arrival of US Navy Seabees of the 55th Battalion. The United States Army and Australians already had a camp at Port Moresby supporting the operation at the Port Moresby Airfield Complex. Seabee's built at large radio station and a communications center. At the port, Seabee built a Port Director center. Seabee built a quonset hut base camp for the staff with a supply depot. The communications center had 2 transmitters and a power station. The radio communications station became operational on July 15, 1943.

The work was started by 70 Seabees from the 55th Battalion from Naval Base Brisbane. Added to the crew were 50 Seabees from 55th Battalion from Naval Base Milne Bay working at the base from September to December 1943. When the construction was complete the crew returned to Brisbane. For day-to-day operation of the Base and port, Seabee of the CBMU 546 arrived on April 3, 1944. In October 1944 the base was no longer close to the action and Seabee started to ship out parts of the base. The closure was completed by November 1, 1944.

Fleet Post Office FPO# is 162 SF Port Moresby.

== Port Moresby Flying Boat Base ==
Port Moresby Flying Boat Base was built by Royal Australian Air Force (RAAF) marine section in 1939. The base had seaplane ramp and mooring areas. The US Navy operated VP-101, Consolidated PBY Catalina from the base from August to December 1943. RAAF operated PBY 11 Squadron and RAAF PBY 20 Squadron from the base. Post war Qantas PBY and Sandringham flying boats had flights from the base.

== See also ==
- US Naval Advance Bases
- Naval Base Woodlark Island
- Naval Base Milne Bay
- Naval Base Finschhafen
- US Naval Base New Guinea

== Gallery ==
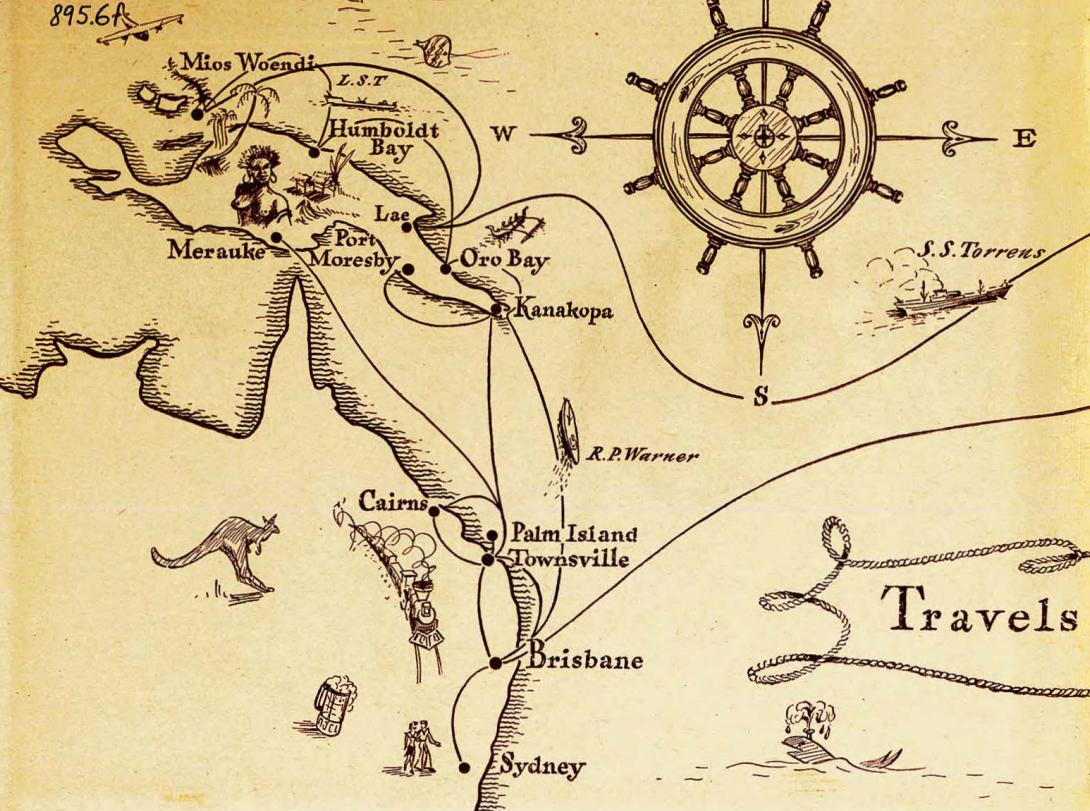
Camp Seabee Naval Base Brisbane building trips map

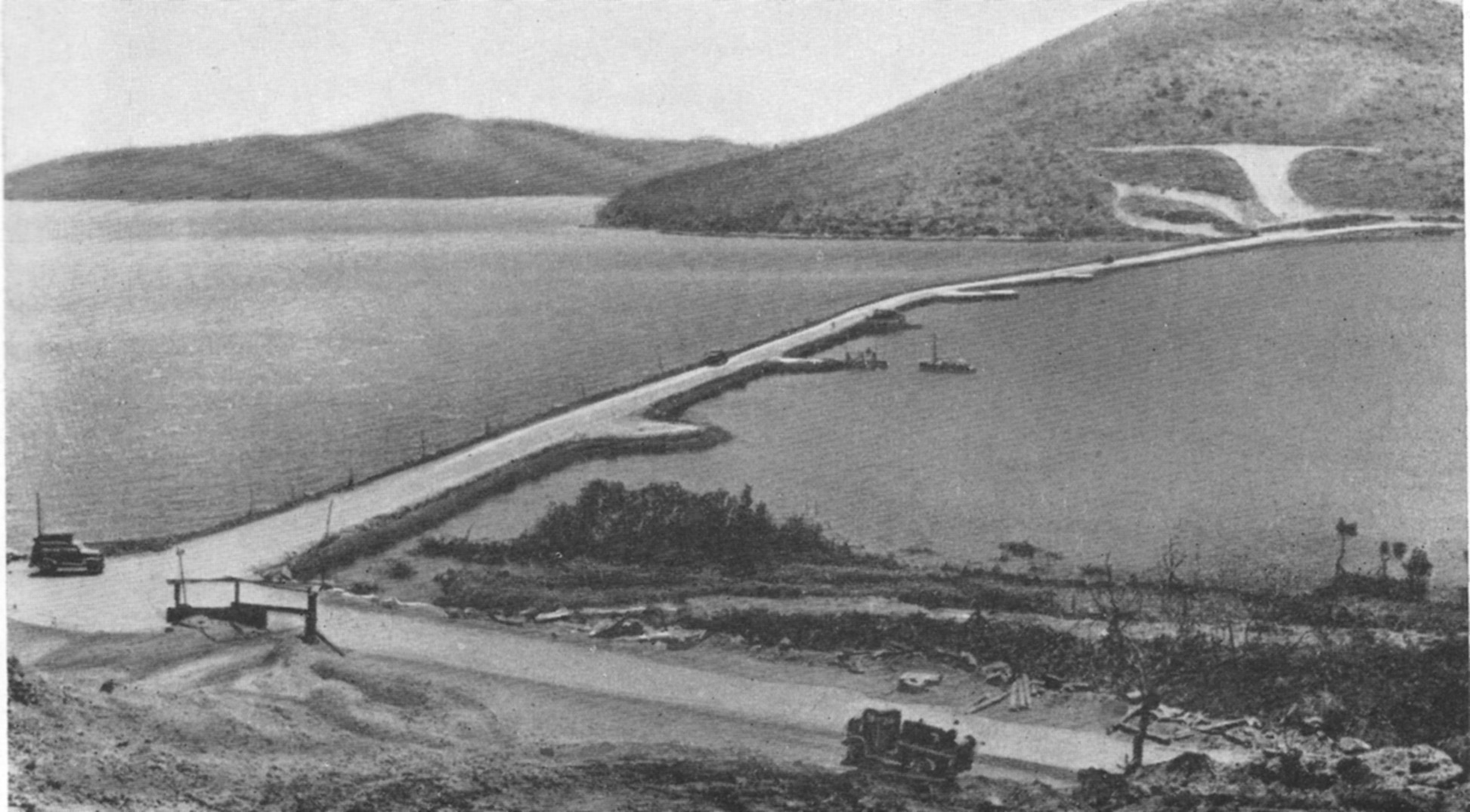
Tatana Island Causeway built from Port Moresby to Tatana Island by US Army for as an unloading base.

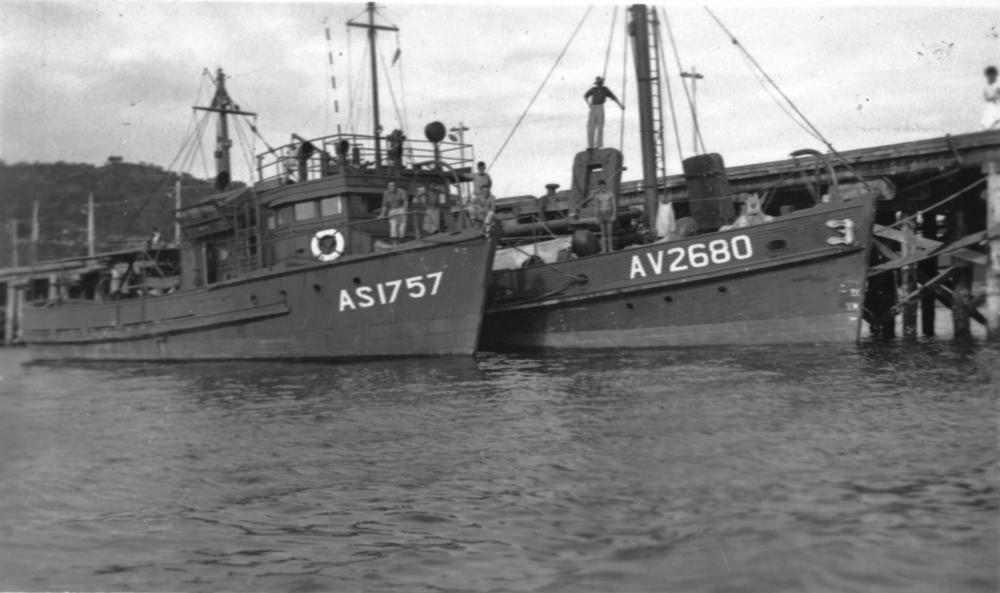
Two ships of the Royal Australian Corps of Transport at Port Moresby

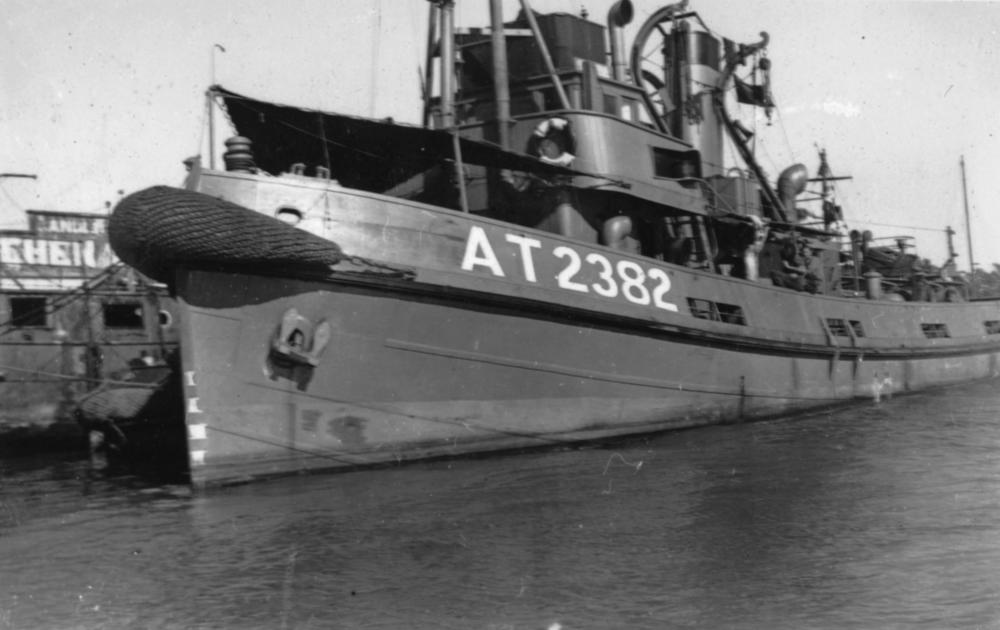
Tugboat USS Irma AT-2382 at Port Moresby

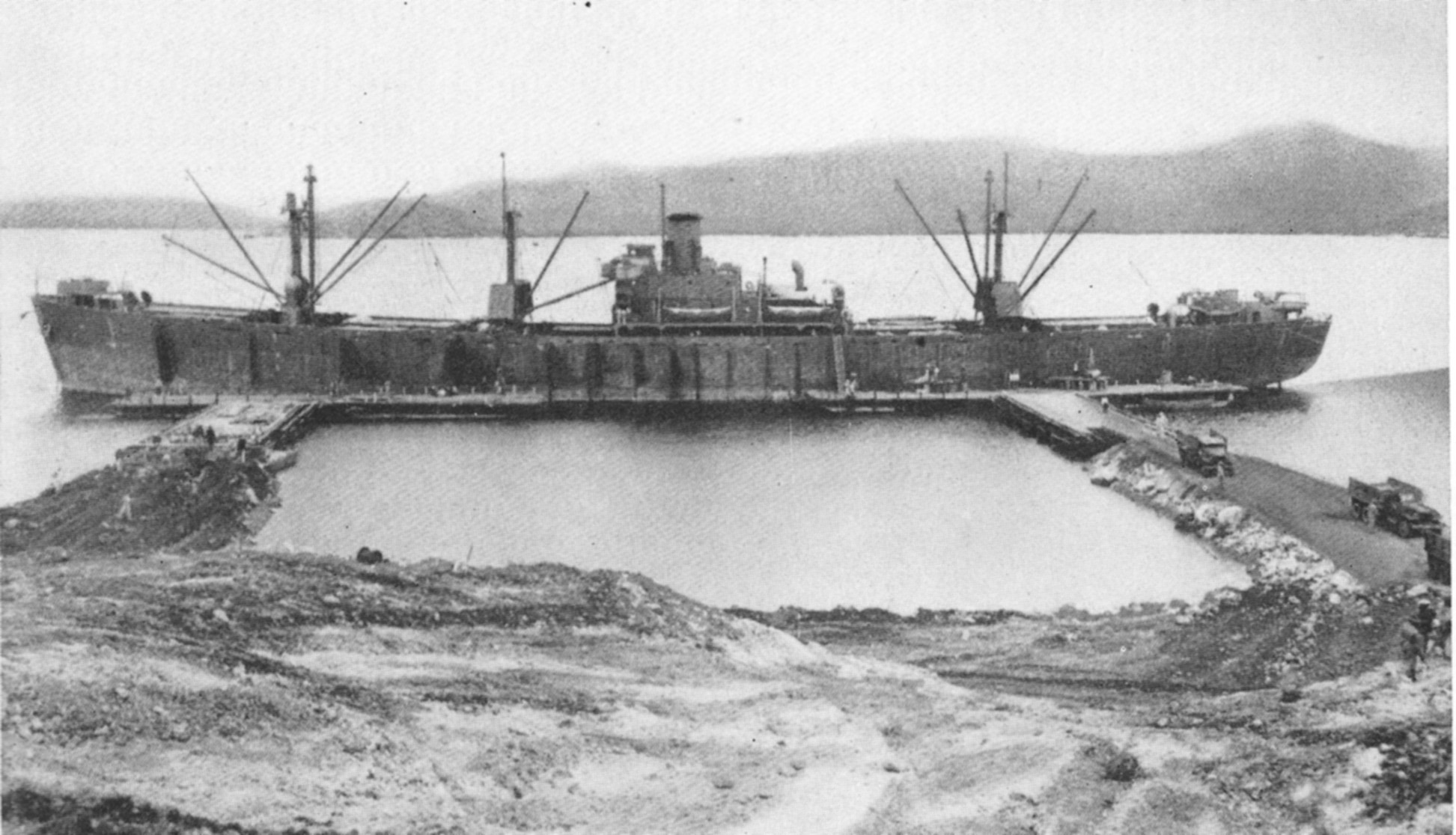
US Army unloading dock at Tatana Island

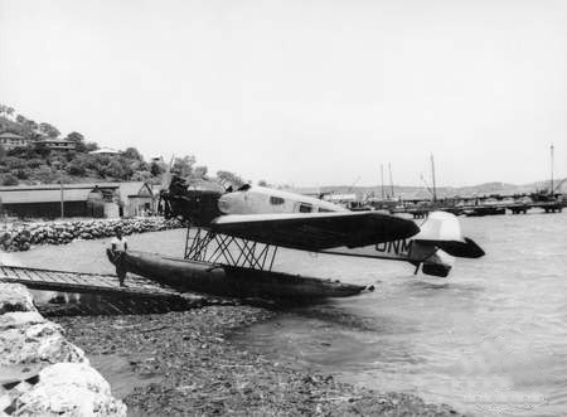
Port Moresby Flying Boat Base in 1940, with an Australian Guinea Airways plane, pre war

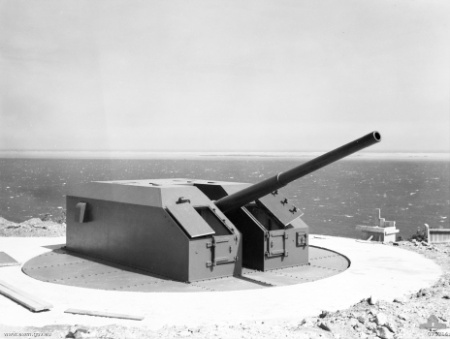
5.25 inch gun at Port Moresby in 1944

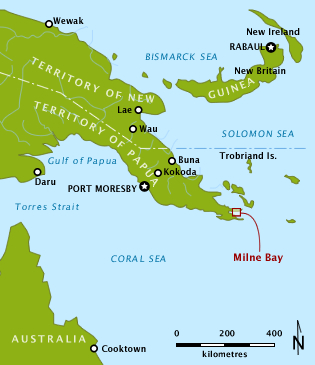
Naval Base Port Moresby was supported by nearby Naval Base Milne Bay
