= Mullins Harbour =

Harbour in Papua New Guinea

Coordinates: 10°29′S 149°59′E

Mullins Harbour is a natural harbour on the south-eastern coast of Milne Bay Province, Papua New Guinea. The Badila, Wegulani and Sagarai Rivers enter into the harbour. The harbour is protected from the ocean and is entered via the Maruta Passage and is known as a fishing haven.
