= Tatana Island =

Island in Papua New Guinea

Coordinates: 9°26′15″S 147°7′30″E

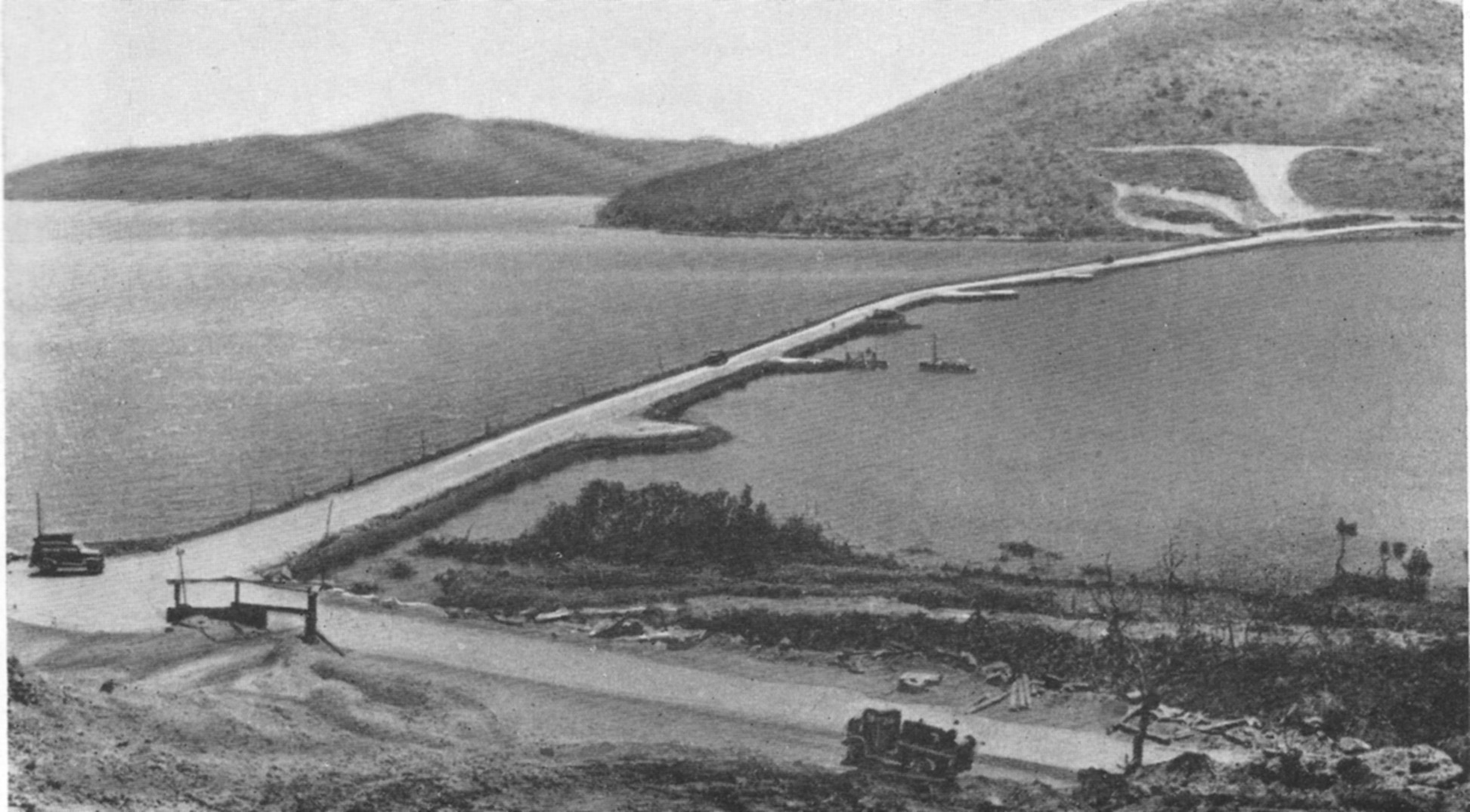
Causeway connecting the docks on Tatana Island with the mainland at Port Moresby

Tatana Island is located in the National Capital District of Papua New Guinea. Located in the North-West electorate of Port Moresby. The island is about 0.48 km^{2} (0.19 sq mi) in area, and consists of a single hilly rise some 800 metres (870 yd) by 500 metres (550 yd) in size.

All the settlement on the island is concentrated in a strip of buildings along the northern shore, simply known as Tatana. This settlement is connected to the mainland by an artificial causeway built by the United States Army during World War II, which carries a road link.

== See also ==
- Naval Base Port Moresby
