= HMAS Matafele =

Cargo and passenger vessel, 1938–1944

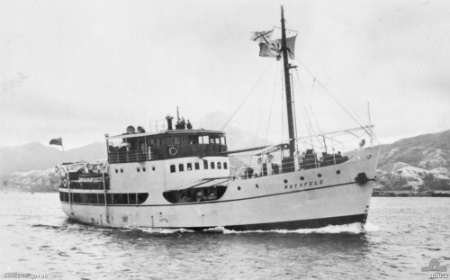
- Matafele in 1938

History
- Name: Matafele
- Namesake: Matafele district, Western Samoa
- Owner: Burns Philp
- Completed: 1938
- In service: 1938
- Out of service: 1942
- Fate: Taken up for naval service

Australia
- Acquired: December 1942
- Commissioned: 1 January 1943
- Fate: Lost at sea, 20 June 1944

General characteristics
- Tonnage: 335 GRT
- Length: 115 ft 5 in (35.18 m)
- Beam: 25 ft 6 in (7.77 m)
- Draught: 10 ft 6 in (3.20 m)
- Complement: 4 officers, 14 naval sailors, 13 Islander crew (in RAN service)
- Armament: 1 × 12-pounder anti-aircraft gun (in RAN service)

HMAS Matafele was a small cargo and passenger vessel which was operated by Burns Philp from 1938 to 1942 and the Royal Australian Navy (RAN) from 1943 until she was lost with all of her crew as a result of an accident in June 1944.

== Career ==
The 335 gross register ton vessel was built in 1938 by the Hong Kong and Whampoa Dock Company in Hong Kong for the Burns Philp shipping line. From 1938 to 1942, Matafele operated on the passenger-cargo routes of the Pacific Islands. Although the officers were European, the crew was made up of Pacific Islander natives.

The vessel was the last ship to depart Simpson Harbour in January 1942, escaping as a Japanese invasion force landed. Matafele was able to escape undetected to Australia, and was placed under the control of the Australian Commonwealth Shipping Board in March. Initially assigned to transport military stores around northern Australia, the ship was later tasked to operate out of Port Moresby. Duties were again the transportation of military cargo, this time along the New Guinea coast. Matafele was the first Allied supply vessel to land stores at Milne Bay following the Japanese landing there.

In December 1942, activities to transfer the vessel to naval service commenced. The civilian officers were replaced by a naval complement of 4 officers and 14 sailors, drawn from the shore establishment at HMAS Basilisk. The 13 islander crewmen volunteered to stay aboard and agreed to serve as part of the Australian New Guinea Administrative Unit. A 12-pounder anti-aircraft gun was fitted aft, while bulletproof plating was fitted around the bridge, and extra ballast was installed. Matafele was commissioned as a ship of the Royal Australian Navy on 1 January 1943. Matafele is the only ship of the RAN to be commissioned while at sea. Transportation of stores remained the ship's main role, but this was supplemented by survey and navigation duties. Between February and March 1944, the ship underwent refits in Sydney. On returning to service, Matafele was tasked with transporting cargo from various Queensland ports to Milne Bay.

== Loss ==
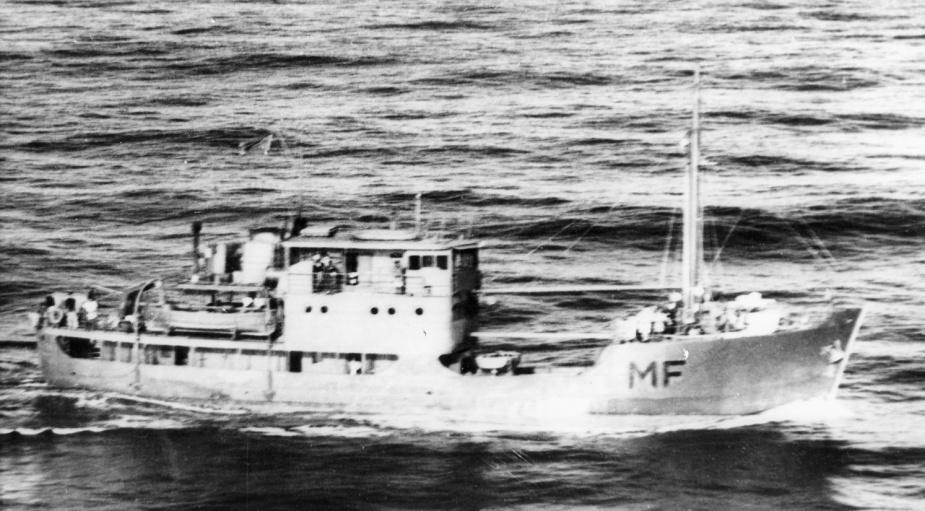
Matafele in wartime colours

After a short period in Townsville, Queensland to repair a fractured bearing in the starboard engine, Matafele sailed for Milne Bay on 18 June with 215 tons of naval stores. The ship was due to arrive in Milne Bay on the morning of 22 June after transiting the Grafton Passage and China Strait. However, the ship did not arrive on schedule. On 23 June, a radio request was made for Matafele to report her position. There was no reply, but on 24 June, a Bristol Beaufort overflying the China Strait reported seeing the vessel underway but struggling close to the coast in heavy weather. After no reply was received and the ship still did not arrive, the Naval Officer in Charge New Guinea had a second transmission sent, with orders to break radio silence and report. The lack of reply prompted a search by the Bathurst-class corvettes Townsville, Latrobe, Goulburn, and Geelong, the motor launches 1338 and 1339, and aircraft from Cairns and New Guinea; again with no results. An oar with the ship's name carved into it, along with two damaged boats, were later found off the south coast of Papua.

A Board of Inquiry concluded in October 1944 that Matafele had foundered en route, likely on 20 June, with all aboard (4 officers, 20 RAN sailors, and 13 Pacific Island crew) lost. A second inquiry, a few weeks later, rejected the foundering conclusion, but was unable to determine the cause of the disappearance. The possibility of attack by submarine was considered by a post-war inquiry, which determined that no Japanese submarines were in the area at the time.

== Memorial ==
A memorial plaque is dedicated to HMAS Matafele and her Tasmanian RAN personnel at the Tasmanian Seafarers' Memorial at Triabunna on the east coast of Tasmania.
