= HMAS Latrobe =

Australian Bathurst-class corvette

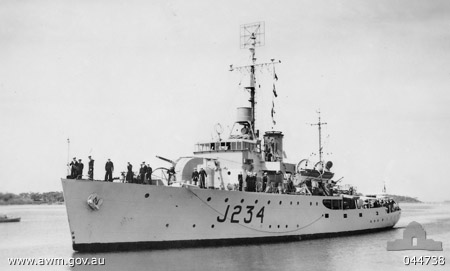
- HMAS Latrobe

History

Australia
- Namesake: Town of Latrobe, Tasmania
- Builder: Mort's Dock and Engineering Company
- Laid down: 27 January 1942
- Launched: Floated 19 June 1942
- Commissioned: 6 November 1942
- Decommissioned: 13 March 1953
- Reclassified: Training ship (1946)
- Honours and awards: Battle honours: Darwin 1943; Pacific 1943–45; New Guinea 1943–44; Borneo 1945
- Fate: Sold for scrap, 18 May 1956
- Badge

General characteristics
- Class & type: Bathurst-class corvette
- Displacement: 650 tons (standard), 1,025 tons (full war load)
- Length: 180 ft 10 in (55.12 m)
- Beam: 31 ft 2 in (9.50 m)
- Draught: 8 ft 6 in (2.59 m)
- Propulsion: triple expansion engine, 2 shafts
- Speed: 15.5 knots (28.7 km/h; 17.8 mph) at 2,000 hp
- Complement: 85
- Armament: 1 × 4 inch Mk XVI gun, 3 × Oerlikon 20 mm cannons

HMAS Latrobe (J234/M234), named for the town of Latrobe, Tasmania, was one of 60 Bathurst-class corvettes constructed during World War II, and one of 36 initially manned and commissioned solely by the Royal Australian Navy (RAN).

== Design and construction ==
In 1938, the Australian Commonwealth Naval Board (ACNB) identified the need for a general purpose 'local defence vessel' capable of both anti-submarine and mine-warfare duties, while easy to construct and operate. The vessel was initially envisaged as having a displacement of approximately 500 tons, a speed of at least 10 knots (19 km/h; 12 mph), and a range of 2,000 nautical miles (3,700 km; 2,300 mi) The opportunity to build a prototype in the place of a cancelled Bar-class boom defence vessel saw the proposed design increased to a 680-ton vessel, with a 15.5 knots (28.7 km/h; 17.8 mph) top speed, and a range of 2,850 nautical miles (5,280 km; 3,280 mi), armed with a 4-inch gun, equipped with asdic, and able to fitted with either depth charges or minesweeping equipment depending on the planned operations: although closer in size to a sloop than a local defence vessel, the resulting increased capabilities were accepted due to advantages over British-designed mine warfare and anti-submarine vessels. Construction of the prototype HMAS Kangaroo did not go ahead, but the plans were retained. The need for locally built 'all-rounder' vessels at the start of World War II saw the "Australian Minesweepers" (designated as such to hide their anti-submarine capability, but popularly referred to as "corvettes") approved in September 1939, with 60 constructed during the course of the war: 36 (including Latrobe) ordered by the RAN, 20 ordered by the British Admiralty but manned and commissioned as RAN vessels, and 4 for the Royal Indian Navy.

Latrobe's dimensions differed from the Bathurst-class design: she was shorter (180 ft 10 in (55.12 m) compared to 186 ft (57 m)) and had a slightly wider beam (31 ft 2 in (9.50 m) compared to 31 ft (9.4 m)).

Latrobe was laid down by Mort's Dock and Engineering Company at Balmain, New South Wales on 27 January 1942. As the ship was built in a dock it was floated clear on 19 June 1942. The ship was commissioned into the RAN on 6 November 1942.

== Operational history ==
After entering active service, Latrobe initially served as a convoy escort ship, first between Queensland and New Guinea, then between Darwin and Thursday Island. On 12 February 1943, the corvette unsuccessfully attacked a Japanese submarine. In July, a Darwin-bound convoy escorted by Latrobe was attacked twice by Japanese aircraft, and in December, a lone Japanese bomber attempted to attack the corvette.

In June 1944, Latrobe was reassigned to New Guinea operations, and arrived on 17 June. She spent seven months operating as a convoy escort and anti-submarine patrol ship, before sailing to Adelaide in January 1945 for a two-month refit. Latrobe returned to New Guinea in late April, and served in numerous roles until the end of World War II, including escort, patrol, minesweeping, and shore bombardment.

The corvette received four battle honours for her wartime service: "Darwin 1943", "Pacific 1943–45", "New Guinea 1943–44", and "Borneo 1945".

After the end of the war, Latrobe was involved in the evacuation of Allied prisoners-of-war, and the transportation of occupation forces. She returned to Australia in December 1945, towing two small craft to Sydney before proceeding to Melbourne. In early 1946, the corvette was attached to Flinders Naval Depot for use as a training ship until the end of 1952.

== Decommissioning and fate ==
Latrobe paid off on 13 March 1953. She was placed in reserve on 17 September 1953, where she remained until she was sold for breaking up as scrap to the Hong Kong Rolling Mills on 18 May 1956.
