= August 26 =

August 26 this year in various calendars
- Wednesday, 26 August 2026
Akan	Monowukuo
Armenian	7 Hoṙi 1476
Aztec	Atemoztli 8, 8 Cōzcacuāuhtli
Babylonian	12 Abu, 2337 SE
Balinese pawukon	Luang, Pepet, Kajeng, Laba, Keliwon, Maulu, Buda of Matal, Brahma, Erangan, Manuh
Bengali	11 Bhadro, BS 1433
Chinese	Yang Water Monkey・Winnowing Basket Mansion; Fire Horse Year, Month 7, Day 14 (Chushu, 12 days until Bailu)
Common Era	26 August 2026 CE
Coptic	20 Mesori, AM 1742
Egyptian	12 Tybi, 2775 NE
Ethiopian	20 Naḥasē, 2018 Amätä Məhrät
French Republican	Décade I, Nonidi de Fructidor de l'Année 234 de la République
Gregorian	26 August, AD 2026
Hebrew	13 Elul, AM 5786
Hindu	Śravaṇa・Saubhāgya; Solar: 10 Bhādrapada, 1948 SE; Lunisolar: Adhika Trayodaśī, Śukla pakṣa of Śrāvaṇa, 2083 VE; Rāudra・5127 KY・1,872,813
Icelandic	Miðvikudagur, 2 Tvímánuður 2026
Islamic	12 Rabi' al-awwal, AH 1448 (using tabular method)
ISO week date	2026-W35-3
Japanese	14 Fumizuki, Reiwa 8 (Shosho, 12 days until Hakuro)
Julian	13 August, AD 2026 (AM 7534)
Julian day	2461279
Korean	14 Wonsungidal, 4359 DE
Maya	13.0.13.15.16; 9 Mol, 8 Cib
Roman	Idibus Augustis, MMDCCLXXIX AUC
Solar Hijri	4 Shahrivar, SH 1405
Tibetan	14 gro bzhin, me pho rta 2153 or 1772 or 1000

<<	August					>>
Su	Mo	Tu	We	Th	Fr	Sa
						1
2	3	4	5	6	7	8
9	10	11	12	13	14	15
16	17	18	19	20	21	22
23	24	25	26	27	28	29
30	31
2026

August 26 in recent years
2026 (Wednesday)
2025 (Tuesday)
2024 (Monday)
2023 (Saturday)
2022 (Friday)
2021 (Thursday)
2020 (Wednesday)
2019 (Monday)
2018 (Sunday)
2017 (Saturday)

August 26 is the 238th day of the year (239th in leap years) in the Gregorian calendar; 127 days remain until the end of the year.

== Events ==
=== Pre-1600 ===
- 683 – The Battle of al-Harrah concludes, with Yazid I's army killing 11,000 people of the city of Medina.
- 1071 – The Seljuq Turks defeat the Byzantine army at the Battle of Manzikert, and soon gain control of most of Anatolia.
- 1278 – Ladislaus IV of Hungary and Rudolf I of Germany defeat Ottokar II of Bohemia in the Battle on the Marchfeld near Dürnkrut in (then) Moravia.
- 1303 – Chittorgarh falls to the Delhi Sultanate.
- 1346 – Hundred Years' War: At the Battle of Crécy, an English army easily defeats a French one twice its size.
- 1366 – The Byzantine Empire retakes Gallipoli with the help of the Savoyard Crusade.
- 1444 – Battle of St. Jakob an der Birs: A vastly outnumbered force of Swiss Confederates is defeated by the Dauphin Louis (future Louis XI of France) and his army of 'Armagnacs' near Basel.
- 1542 – A year and a half after leaving Guayaquil on the Pacific coast, Francisco de Orellana finishes his overland journey across South America and reaches the mouth of the Amazon River on the Atlantic coast.

=== 1601–1900 ===
- 1642 – Dutch–Portuguese War: Second Battle of San Salvador: The Dutch force the Spanish garrison at San Salvador (modern day Keelung, Taiwan) to surrender, ending the short-lived Spanish colony on Formosa and replacing it with a new Dutch administration.
- 1648 – The Fronde: First Fronde: In the wake of the successful Battle of Lens, Cardinal Mazarin, Chief Minister of France, suddenly orders the arrest of the leaders of the Parlement of Paris, provoking the rest of Paris to break into insurrection and barricade the streets the next day.
- 1748 – The first Lutheran denomination in North America, the Pennsylvania Ministerium, is founded in Philadelphia.
- 1767 – Jesuits all over Chile are arrested as the Spanish Empire suppresses the Society of Jesus.
- 1768 – Captain James Cook sets sail from England on board HMS Endeavour, starting his first voyage of discovery.
- 1778 – The first recorded ascent of Triglav, the highest mountain in Slovenia.
- 1789 – The Declaration of the Rights of Man and of the Citizen is approved by the National Constituent Assembly of France.
- 1791 – John Fitch is granted a United States patent for the steamboat.
- 1810 – The former viceroy Santiago de Liniers of the Viceroyalty of the Río de la Plata is executed after the defeat of his counter-revolution.
- 1813 – War of the Sixth Coalition: An impromptu battle takes place when French and Prussian-Russian forces accidentally run into each other near Liegnitz, Prussia (now Legnica, Poland).
- 1814 – Chilean War of Independence: Infighting between the rebel forces of José Miguel Carrera and Bernardo O'Higgins erupts in the Battle of Las Tres Acequias.
- 1833 – The great 1833 Kathmandu–Bihar earthquake causes major damage in Nepal, northern India and Tibet, killing a total of 500 people.
- 1849 – President Faustin Soulouque of the First Republic of Haiti has the Senate and Chamber of Deputies proclaim him the Emperor of Haiti, abolishing the Republic and inaugurating the Second Empire of Haiti.
- 1863 – The Swedish-language liberal newspaper Helsingfors Dagblad proposes the current blue-and-white cross flag as the flag of Finland.
- 1883 – The 1883 eruption of Krakatoa begins its final, paroxysmal, stage.

=== 1901–present ===
- 1914 – World War I: The German colony of Togoland surrenders to French and British forces after a 20-day campaign. Togoland is the first German colony to fall to Allied hands in World War I.
- 1914 – World War I: During the retreat from Mons, the British II Corps commanded by General Sir Horace Smith-Dorrien fights a vigorous and successful defensive action at Le Cateau.
- 1920 – The 19th amendment to United States Constitution, giving women the right to vote, is certified.
- 1922 – Greco-Turkish War (1919–22): Turkish army launched what has come to be known to the Turks as the Great Offensive (Büyük Taarruz). The major Greek defense positions were overrun.
- 1936 – Spanish Civil War: Santander falls to the Nationalists and the Republican Interprovincial Council is dissolved.
- 1940 – World War II: Chad becomes the first French colony to join the Allies under the administration of Félix Éboué, France's first black colonial governor.
- 1942 – The Holocaust in Ukraine: At Chortkiv, the Ukrainian police and German Schutzpolizei deport two thousand Jews to Bełżec extermination camp. Five hundred of the sick and children are murdered on the spot. This continued until the next day.
- 1944 – World War II: Charles de Gaulle enters Paris.
- 1966 – The South African Border War starts with the battle at Omugulugwombashe.
- 1969 – Aeroflot Flight 1770 crashes while landing at Vnukovo International Airport, killing 16.
- 1970 – The fiftieth anniversary of American women being able to vote is marked by a nationwide Women's Strike for Equality.
- 1972 – The Games of the XX Olympiad open in Munich, West Germany.
- 1977 – The Charter of the French Language is adopted by the National Assembly of Quebec.
- 1978 – Papal conclave: Albino Luciani is elected as Pope John Paul I.
- 1980 – After John Birges plants a bomb at Harvey's Resort Hotel in Stateline, Nevada, in the United States, the FBI inadvertently detonates the bomb during its disarming.
- 1981 – Aeropesca Flight 221 crashes in Colombia's Huila Department, killing all 50 people on board.
- 1993 – Sakha Avia Flight 301 crashes on approach to Aldan Airport, killing all 24 aboard.
- 1997 – Beni Ali massacre occurs in Algeria, leaving 60 to 100 people dead.
- 1998 – The first flight of the Boeing Delta III ends in disaster 75 seconds after liftoff, resulting in the loss of the Galaxy X communications satellite.
- 1999 – Russia begins the Second Chechen War in response to the Invasion of Dagestan by the Islamic International Peacekeeping Brigade.
- 2003 – A Beechcraft 1900 operating as Colgan Air Flight 9446 crashes after taking off from Barnstable Municipal Airport in Yarmouth, Massachusetts, killing both pilots on board.
- 2009 – Kidnapping victim Jaycee Dugard is discovered alive in California after being missing for over 18 years. Her captors, Phillip and Nancy Garrido, are apprehended.
- 2011 – The Boeing 787 Dreamliner, Boeing's all-new composite airliner, receives certification from the EASA and the FAA.
- 2014 – The Jay Report into the Rotherham child sexual exploitation scandal is published.
- 2015 – Two U.S. journalists are shot and killed by a disgruntled former coworker while conducting a live report in Moneta, Virginia.
- 2018 – Three people are killed and eleven wounded during a mass shooting at a Madden NFL '19 video game tournament in Jacksonville, Florida.
- 2021 – During the 2021 Kabul airlift, a suicide bombing at Hamid Karzai International Airport kills 13 US military personnel and at least 169 Afghan civilians.
- 2023 – Exactly five years after the 2018 Jacksonville Landing shooting, there is another shooting in Jacksonville, Florida, leaving three people dead.
- 2026 – A series of large flash floods and debris flows along the Nepal–Tibet border and the Trishuli River, believed to have been caused by glacier collapse, stuck and destroyed numerous settlements, including the Gyirong checkpoint, and killed over 1,400 people, with over 5,800 reported missing.

== Births ==
=== Pre-1600 ===
- 1548 – Bernardino Poccetti, Italian painter (died 1612)
- 1582 – Humilis of Bisignano, Italian Franciscan friar and saint (died 1637)
- 1596 – Frederick V, Elector Palatine, Bohemian king (died 1632)

=== 1601–1900 ===
- 1676 – Robert Walpole, English politician, Prime Minister of the United Kingdom (died 1745)
- 1694 – Elisha Williams, English colonial minister, academic, and politician (died 1755)
- 1695 – Marie-Anne-Catherine Quinault, French singer-songwriter (died 1791)
- 1728 – Johann Heinrich Lambert, Swiss mathematician, physicist, and astronomer (died 1777)
- 1736 – Jean-Baptiste L. Romé de l'Isle, French mineralogist and geologist (died 1790)
- 1740 – Joseph-Michel Montgolfier, French inventor, invented the hot air balloon (died 1810)
- 1743 – Antoine Lavoisier, French chemist and biologist (died 1794)
- 1751 – Manuel Abad y Queipo, Spanish-born Mexican bishop (died 1825)
- 1775 – William Joseph Behr, German publicist and academic (died 1851)
- 1783 – Federigo Zuccari, astronomer, director of the Astronomical Observatory of Naples (died 1817)
- 1792 – Manuel Oribe, Uruguayan soldier and politician, 4th President of Uruguay (died 1857)
- 1797 – Saint Innocent of Alaska, Russian Orthodox missionary priest, then the first Orthodox bishop and archbishop in the Americas, and finally the Metropolitan of Moscow and all Russia (died 1879)
- 1819 – Albert, Prince Consort of the United Kingdom (died 1861)
- 1824 – Martha Darley Mutrie, British painter (died 1885)
- 1842 – Heinrich Quincke, German internist and surgeon (introduced lumbar puncture) (died 1922)
- 1854 – Arnold Fothergill, English cricketer (died 1932)
- 1856 – Clara Schønfeld, Danish actress (died 1939)
- 1862 – Herbert Booth, Canadian songwriter and bandleader (died 1926)
- 1865 – Arthur James Arnot, Scottish-Australian engineer, designed the Spencer Street Power Station (died 1946)
- 1873 – Lee de Forest, American engineer and academic, invented the Audion tube (died 1961)
- 1874 – Zona Gale, American novelist, short story writer, and playwright (died 1938)
- 1875 – John Buchan, 1st Baron Tweedsmuir, Scottish-Canadian historian and politician, 15th Governor General of Canada (died 1940)
- 1880 – Guillaume Apollinaire, Italian-French author, poet, playwright, and critic (died 1918)
- 1882 – James Franck, German physicist and academic, Nobel Prize laureate (died 1964)
- 1882 – Sam Hardy, English footballer (died 1966)
- 1885 – Jules Romains, French author and poet (died 1972)
- 1888 – Gustavo R. Vincenti, Maltese architect and developer (died 1974)
- 1891 – Acharya Chatursen Shastri, Indian author and playwright (died 1960)
- 1894 – Sparky Adams, American baseball player and farmer (died 1989)
- 1896 – Ivan Mihailov, Bulgarian soldier and politician (died 1990)
- 1897 – Yun Posun, South Korean activist and politician, 2nd President of South Korea (died 1990)
- 1898 – Peggy Guggenheim, American-Italian art collector and philanthropist (died 1979)
- 1900 – Margaret Utinsky, American nurse, recipient of the Medal of Freedom (died 1970)
- 1900 – Hellmuth Walter, German-American engineer and businessman (died 1980)

=== 1901–present ===
- 1901 – Eleanor Dark, Australian author and poet (died 1985)
- 1901 – Hans Kammler, German SS officer and engineer (died 1945)
- 1901 – Jimmy Rushing, American singer and bandleader (died 1972)
- 1901 – Maxwell D. Taylor, American general and diplomat, United States Ambassador to South Vietnam (died 1987)
- 1901 – Chen Yi, Chinese general and politician, 2nd Foreign Minister of the People's Republic of China (died 1972)
- 1903 – Caroline Pafford Miller, American author (died 1992)
- 1904 – Christopher Isherwood, English-American author and academic (died 1986)
- 1904 – Joe Hulme, English footballer and cricketer (died 1991)
- 1905 – Helen Sharsmith, American biologist and educator (died 1982)
- 1906 – Bunny Austin, English tennis player (died 2000)
- 1906 – Albert Sabin, Polish-American physician and virologist, developed the polio vaccine (died 1993)
- 1908 – Walter Bruno Henning, Prussian-American linguist and scholar (died 1967)
- 1908 – Aubrey Schenck, American screenwriter and producer (died 1999)
- 1909 – Eric Davies, South African cricketer and educator (died 1976)
- 1909 – Jim Davis, American actor (died 1981)
- 1909 – Gene Moore, American baseball player (died 1978)
- 1910 – Mother Teresa, Albanian-Indian nun, missionary, Catholic saint, and Nobel Prize laureate (died 1997)
- 1911 – Otto Binder, American author and screenwriter (died 1974)
- 1912 – John Tinniswood, British supercentenarian (died 2024)
- 1914 – Julio Cortázar, Belgian-Argentinian author and translator (died 1984)
- 1914 – Fazıl Hüsnü Dağlarca, Turkish soldier and poet (died 2008)
- 1915 – Humphrey Searle, English composer and conductor (died 1982)
- 1918 – Katherine Johnson, American physicist and mathematician (died 2020)
- 1919 – Gerard Campbell, American priest and academic (died 2012)
- 1920 – Brant Parker, American illustrator (died 2007)
- 1920 – Prem Tinsulanonda, Thai general and politician, 16th Prime Minister of Thailand (died 2019)
- 1921 – Shimshon Amitsur, Israeli mathematician and scholar (died 1994)
- 1921 – Benjamin C. Bradlee, American journalist and author (died 2014)
- 1922 – Irving R. Levine, American journalist and author (died 2009)
- 1923 – Wolfgang Sawallisch, German pianist and conductor (died 2013)
- 1924 – Alex Kellner, American baseball player (died 1996)
- 1925 – Jack Hirshleifer, American economist and academic (died 2005)
- 1925 – Alain Peyrefitte, French scholar and politician, Minister of Justice for France (died 1999)
- 1925 – Pyotr Todorovsky, Ukrainian-Russian director, screenwriter, and cinematographer (died 2013)
- 1925 – Etelka Keserű, Hungarian economist and politician (died 2018)
- 1925 – Gustavo Becerra-Schmidt, Chilean composer (died 2010)
- 1926 – Anahit Tsitsikian, Armenian violinist and educator (died 1999)
- 1926 – Robert Vickrey, American painter and author (died 2011)
- 1928 – Peter Appleyard, British-Canadian jazz vibraphonist (died 2015)
- 1928 – Om Prakash Munjal, Indian businessman and philanthropist, co-founded Hero Cycles (died 2015)
- 1929 – Reuben Kamanga, Zambian soldier and politician, 1st Vice President of Zambia (died 1996)
- 1930 – Joe Solomon, Guyanese cricketer and coach (died 2023)
- 1931 – Kálmán Markovits, Hungarian water polo player (died 2009)
- 1932 – Luis Salvadores Salvi, Chilean basketball player (died 2014)
- 1934 – Tom Heinsohn, American basketball player, coach, and sportscaster (died 2020)
- 1934 – Kevin Ryan, Australian rugby player, coach, lawyer and politician
- 1935 – Geraldine Ferraro, American lawyer and politician (died 2011)
- 1935 – Karen Spärck Jones, English computer scientist and academic (died 2007)
- 1936 – Benedict Anderson, American political scientist and academic (died 2015)
- 1937 – Don Bowman, American singer-songwriter (died 2013)
- 1938 – Jet Black, English drummer (died 2022)
- 1939 – Pinchas Goldstein, Israeli businessman and politician (died 2007)
- 1939 – Jorge Paulo Lemann, Brazilian banker and financier
- 1939 – Bill White, Canadian ice hockey player and coach (died 2017)
- 1940 – Michael Cockerell, English journalist
- 1940 – Don LaFontaine, American voice actor, producer, and screenwriter (died 2008)
- 1940 – Nik Turner, English musician and songwriter (died 2022)
- 1941 – Chris Curtis, English drummer and singer (died 2005)
- 1941 – Barbara Ehrenreich, American activist, journalist and author (died 2022)
- 1941 – Jane Merrow, English actress, producer, and screenwriter
- 1941 – Barbet Schroeder, French-Swiss director and producer
- 1942 – Dennis Turner, Baron Bilston, English lawyer and politician (died 2014)
- 1942 – Chow Kwai Lam, Malaysian football coach and player (died 2018)
- 1942 – Vic Dana, American dancer and singer
- 1943 – Dori Caymmi, Brazilian singer-songwriter and guitarist
- 1944 – Prince Richard, Duke of Gloucester
- 1944 – Alan Parker, English guitarist and songwriter
- 1944 – Judith Rees, English geographer and academic
- 1944 – Maureen Tucker, American singer-songwriter and drummer
- 1945 – Tom Ridge, American sergeant and politician, 1st Secretary of Homeland Security
- 1946 – Zhou Ji, Chinese engineer and politician, 14th Chinese Minister of Education
- 1946 – Valerie Simpson, American singer-songwriter
- 1946 – Mark Snow, American composer for film and television (died 2025)
- 1946 – Alison Steadman, English actress
- 1947 – Nicolae Dobrin, Romanian footballer and manager (died 2007)
- 1949 – Allahshukur Pashazadeh, Azerbaijani cleric
- 1949 – Leon Redbone, Canadian-American singer-songwriter, guitarist, and producer (died 2019)
- 1951 – Gerd Bonk, German weightlifter (died 2014)
- 1951 – Bill Whitaker, American journalist
- 1951 – Edward Witten, American physicist and academic
- 1952 – Bryon Baltimore, Canadian ice hockey player
- 1952 – Michael Jeter, American actor (died 2003)
- 1952 – Will Shortz, American journalist and puzzle creator
- 1953 – David Hurley, Australian general and politician, 27th Governor General of Australia
- 1953 – Andrea Saltelli, Italian statistician and sociologist
- 1953 – Pat Sharkey, Irish footballer
- 1954 – Howard Clark, English golfer and sportscaster
- 1955 – Giuseppe Resnati, Italian chemist and educator
- 1956 – Sally Beamish, English viola player and composer
- 1956 – Brett Cullen, American actor
- 1957 – Dr. Alban, Swedish musician
- 1957 – Rick Hansen, Canadian track and field athlete (Paralympic Games), activist, and philanthropist for people with disabilities
- 1958 – Jan Nevens, Belgian cyclist
- 1959 – Oliver Colvile, English lawyer and politician
- 1959 – Stan Van Gundy, American basketball player and coach
- 1960 – Branford Marsalis, American saxophonist, composer, and bandleader
- 1960 – Ola Ray, American model and actress
- 1961 – Daniel Lévi, Algerian-French singer-songwriter and pianist (died 2022)
- 1962 – Roger Kingdom, American hurdler
- 1964 – Allegra Huston, English-American author and screenwriter
- 1964 – Zadok Malka, Israeli footballer and manager
- 1964 – Torsten Schmitz, German boxer
- 1964 – Carsten Wolf, German cyclist
- 1964 – Mehriban Aliyeva, 1st Vice President of Azerbaijan, goodwill ambassador of UNESCO and ISESCO
- 1965 – Chris Burke, American actor
- 1966 – Jacques Brinkman, Dutch field hockey player and coach
- 1966 – Shirley Manson, Scottish singer-songwriter and actress
- 1967 – Michael Gove, Scottish journalist and politician, Secretary of State for Education
- 1968 – Chris Boardman, English cyclist
- 1969 – Adrian Young, American drummer and songwriter
- 1970 – Melissa McCarthy, American actress, comedian, producer, and screenwriter
- 1970 – Brett Schultz, South African cricketer
- 1971 – Thalía, Mexican-American singer-songwriter and actress
- 1973 – Richard Evatt, English boxer (died 2012)
- 1974 – Kelvin Cato, American basketball player and coach
- 1974 – Meredith Eaton, American actress
- 1975 – Morgan Ensberg, American baseball player and coach
- 1976 – Mike Colter, American actor
- 1976 – Amaia Montero, Spanish singer-songwriter
- 1977 – Therese Alshammar, Swedish swimmer
- 1977 – Saeko Chiba, Japanese voice actress and singer
- 1977 – Simone Motta, Italian footballer
- 1977 – Morris Peterson, American basketball player
- 1980 – Macaulay Culkin, American actor
- 1980 – Manolis Papamakarios, Greek basketball player
- 1980 – Chris Pine, American actor
- 1981 – Tino Best, Barbadian cricketer
- 1981 – Sebastian Bönig, German footballer
- 1981 – Vangelis Moras, Greek footballer
- 1982 – Angelo Iorio, Italian footballer
- 1982 – John Mulaney, American comedian, actor, writer, and producer
- 1983 – Mattia Cassani, Italian footballer
- 1983 – Félix Porteiro, Spanish race car driver
- 1983 – Nicol David, Malaysian squash player
- 1985 – Hugo Duminil-Copin, French mathematician (Fields Medal 2022)
- 1985 – Oleksiy Kasyanov, Ukrainian decathlete
- 1986 – Vladislav Gussev, Estonian footballer
- 1986 – Saint Jhn, Guyanese-American rapper, singer, and songwriter
- 1986 – Colin Kazim-Richards, Turkish footballer
- 1986 – Cassie Ventura, American singer, dancer, actress and model
- 1988 – Elvis Andrus, Venezuelan baseball player
- 1988 – Evan Ross, American actor
- 1988 – Danielle Savre, American actress
- 1988 – Wayne Simmonds, Canadian ice hockey player
- 1988 – Lars Stindl, German footballer
- 1990 – Lorenzo Brown, American basketball player
- 1990 – Irina-Camelia Begu, Romanian tennis player
- 1991 – Jessie Diggins, American cross-country skier
- 1991 – Dylan O'Brien, American actor
- 1993 – Keke Palmer, American actress and singer
- 1994 – Alex Collins, American football player (died 2023)
- 1994 – Austin Gunn, American professional wrestler
- 1995 – Anthony Duclair, Canadian ice hockey player
- 1995 – Ranger Suárez, Venezuelan baseball player
- 1997 – Cordae, American rapper
- 1998 – Charlie Gillespie, Canadian actor and singer
- 1998 – Jeon Soyeon, Korean rapper and record producer
- 1999 – Rosa, former sea otter at Monterey Bay Aquarium
- 1999 – Naz Reid, American basketball player
- 1999 – Kotoshoho Yoshinari, Japanese sumo wrestler
- 2000 – Kyren Williams, American football player
- 2001 – Patrick Williams, American basketball player
- 2002 – Lil Tecca, American rapper
- 2006 – Victoria Mboko, Canadian tennis player

== Deaths ==
=== Pre-1600 ===
- 787 – Arechis II, duke of Benevento
- 887 – Kōkō, emperor of Japan (born 830)
- 1214 – Michael IV of Constantinople
- 1278 – Ottokar II of Bohemia (born 1233)
- 1346 – Charles II, Count of Alençon (born 1297)
- 1346 – Louis I, Count of Flanders (born 1304)
- 1346 – Louis II, Count of Blois
- 1346 – Rudolph, Duke of Lorraine (born 1320)
- 1346 – John of Bohemia (born 1296)
- 1349 – Thomas Bradwardine, English archbishop, mathematician, and physicist (born 1290)
- 1399 – Mikhail II, Grand Prince of Tver (born 1333)
- 1462 – Catherine Zaccaria, Despotess of the Morea
- 1486 – Ernest, Elector of Saxony (born 1441)
- 1500 – Philipp I, Count of Hanau-Münzenberg (born 1449)
- 1551 – Margaret Leijonhufvud, queen of Gustav I of Sweden (born 1516)
- 1572 – Petrus Ramus, French philosopher and logician (born 1515)
- 1595 – António, Prior of Crato (born 1531)

=== 1601–1900 ===
- 1666 – Frans Hals, Dutch painter and educator (born 1580)
- 1714 – Constantin Brâncoveanu, Ruler of Wallachia (born 1654)
- 1714 – Edward Fowler, English bishop and author (born 1632)
- 1723 – Antonie van Leeuwenhoek, Dutch microscopist and biologist (born 1632)
- 1778 – Johan Augustin Mannerheim, Swedish nobleman and military leader (born 1706)
- 1785 – George Germain, 1st Viscount Sackville, English soldier and politician, 3rd Secretary of State for the Colonies (born 1716)
- 1810 – Santiago de Liniers, 1st Count of Buenos Aires, French-Spanish sailor and politician, 10th Viceroyalty of the Río de la Plata (born 1753)
- 1813 – Theodor Körner, German soldier and author (born 1791)
- 1850 – Louis Philippe I of France (born 1773)
- 1865 – Johann Franz Encke, German astronomer and academic (born 1791)
- 1878 – Mariam Baouardy, Syrian Roman Catholic nun; later canonized (born 1846)

=== 1901–present ===
- 1910 – William James, American psychologist and philosopher (born 1842)
- 1921 – Matthias Erzberger, German publicist and politician (born 1875)
- 1921 – Sándor Wekerle, Hungarian jurist and politician, Prime Minister of Hungary (born 1848)
- 1921 – Petro Petrenko, Ukrainian anarchist military commander (born 1890)
- 1930 – Lon Chaney, American actor, director, and screenwriter (born 1883)
- 1943 – Bîmen Şen, Turkish composer and songwriter (born 1873)
- 1944 – Adam von Trott zu Solz, German lawyer and diplomat (born 1909)
- 1945 – Franz Werfel, Austrian author and playwright (born 1890)
- 1946 – Jeanie MacPherson, American actress and screenwriter (born 1887)
- 1956 – Alfred Wagenknecht, German-American activist (born 1881)
- 1958 – Ralph Vaughan Williams, English composer and educator (born 1872)
- 1966 – W. W. E. Ross, Canadian geophysicist and poet (born 1894)
- 1968 – Kay Francis, American actress (born 1905)
- 1972 – Francis Chichester, English pilot and sailor (born 1901)
- 1974 – Charles Lindbergh, American pilot and explorer (born 1902)
- 1975 – Olaf Holtedahl, Norwegian geologist and academic (born 1885)
- 1976 – Lotte Lehmann, German-American soprano (born 1888)
- 1977 – H. A. Rey, German-American author and illustrator, created Curious George (born 1898)
- 1978 – Charles Boyer, French-American actor, singer, and producer (born 1899)
- 1978 – José Manuel Moreno, Argentinian footballer and manager (born 1916)
- 1979 – Mika Waltari, Finnish author, translator, and academic (born 1908)
- 1980 – Rosa Albach-Retty, German-Austrian actress (born 1874)
- 1980 – Tex Avery, American animator, director, and voice actor (born 1908)
- 1981 – Roger Nash Baldwin, American trade union leader, co-founded the American Civil Liberties Union (born 1884)
- 1981 – Lee Hays, American singer-songwriter (born 1914)
- 1986 – Ted Knight, American actor (born 1923)
- 1987 – John Goddard, Barbadian-English cricketer and manager (born 1919)
- 1987 – Georg Wittig, German chemist and academic, Nobel Prize laureate (born 1897)
- 1988 – Carlos Paião, Portuguese singer-songwriter (born 1957)
- 1989 – Irving Stone, American author (born 1903)
- 1990 – Tang Chang, Thai artist (born 1934)
- 1991 – Mildred Albert, American fashion commentator, TV and radio personality, and fashion show producer (born 1905)
- 1992 – Bob de Moor, Belgian author and illustrator (born 1925)
- 1993 – Reima Pietilä, Finnish architect, co-designed the Kaleva Church (born 1923)
- 1995 – John Brunner, English-Scottish author and poet (born 1934)
- 1998 – Frederick Reines, American physicist, Nobel Prize laureate (born 1918)
- 2000 – Akbar Adibi, Iranian engineer and academic (born 1939)
- 2000 – Bunny Austin, English tennis player (born 1906)
- 2001 – Louis Muhlstock, Polish-Canadian painter and educator (born 1904)
- 2001 – Marita Petersen, Faroese educator and politician, 8th Prime Minister of the Faroe Islands (born 1940)
- 2003 – Jim Wacker, American football player and coach (born 1937)
- 2004 – Laura Branigan, American singer-songwriter and actress (born 1952)
- 2005 – Denis D'Amour, Canadian guitarist and songwriter (born 1960)
- 2005 – Robert Denning, American art collector and interior designer (born 1927)
- 2005 – Moondog King, Canadian wrestler and politician (born 1949)
- 2006 – Rainer Barzel, Polish-German lawyer and politician, Minister of Intra-German Relations (born 1924)
- 2006 – Clyde Walcott, Barbadian cricketer and coach (born 1926)
- 2006 – William Garnett, American landscape photographer (born 1916)
- 2007 – Gaston Thorn, Luxembourger jurist and politician, 20th Prime Minister of Luxembourg (born 1928)
- 2009 – Dominick Dunne, American journalist and novelist (born 1925)
- 2010 – Raimon Panikkar, Catalan priest and scholar (born 1918)
- 2011 – George Band, Taiwanese-English mountaineer and author (born 1929)
- 2011 – Patrick C. Fischer, American computer scientist and academic (born 1935)
- 2011 – John McAleese, Scottish sergeant (born 1949)
- 2012 – Russ Alben, American composer and businessman (born 1929)
- 2012 – Reginald Bartholomew, American academic and diplomat, United States Ambassador to Italy (born 1936)
- 2012 – Jacques Bensimon, Canadian director and producer (born 1943)
- 2012 – Krzysztof Wilmanski, Polish-German physicist and academic (born 1940)
- 2013 – Hélie de Saint Marc, French soldier (born 1922)
- 2013 – John J. Gilligan, American soldier and politician, 62nd Governor of Ohio (born 1921)
- 2013 – Bill Schmitz, American football player and coach (born 1954)
- 2013 – Jack Sinagra, American lawyer and politician (born 1950)
- 2013 – Clyde A. Wheeler, American soldier and politician (born 1921)
- 2014 – Christian Bourquin, French lawyer and politician (born 1954)
- 2014 – Peter Bacon Hales, American historian, photographer, and author (born 1950)
- 2014 – Caroline Kellett, English journalist (born 1960)
- 2014 – Chūsei Sone, Japanese director, producer, and screenwriter (born 1937)
- 2015 – Amelia Boynton Robinson, American activist (born 1905)
- 2015 – Donald Eric Capps, American theologian, author, and academic (born 1939)
- 2015 – P. J. Kavanagh, English poet and author (born 1931)
- 2015 – Stefanos Manikas, Greek politician (born 1952)
- 2015 – Francisco San Diego, Filipino bishop (born 1935)
- 2017 – Tobe Hooper, American film director (born 1943)
- 2018 – Neil Simon, American playwright and author (born 1927)
- 2020 – Joe Ruby, American animator (born 1933)
- 2023 – Bob Barker, American television game show host (born 1923)
- 2024 – Sven-Göran Eriksson, Swedish footballer and manager (born 1948)
- 2024 – Sid Eudy, American actor and professional wrestler (born 1960)
- 2026 – Peter Cullen, Canadian voice actor (born 1941)
- 2026 – Péter Nádas, Hungarian author and playwright (born 1942)

== Holidays and observances ==
- Christian feast day:
  - Alexander of Bergamo (Roman Catholic Church)
  - Blessed Ceferino Namuncurá
  - Jeanne-Elisabeth Bichier des Ages
  - Blessed John Paul I
  - Blessed Lavrentia Herasymiv
  - Mariam Baouardy (Melkite Greek Catholic Church)
  - Melchizedek
  - Our Lady of Częstochowa
  - Simplicius, Constantius and Victorinus
  - Teresa Jornet Ibars
  - August 26 (Eastern Orthodox liturgics)
- Heroes' Day (Namibia)
- International Dog Day, an observance promoting dog adoption and animal welfare (2004).
- Repentance Day (Papua New Guinea)
- Women's Equality Day (United States)
