= Lester Brain =

Australian aviation pioneer

Lester Joseph Brain
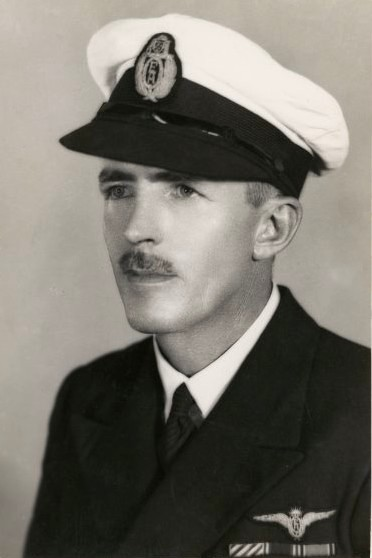
- Qantas Captain Lester Brain in the 1930s
- Born: 27 February 1903; Forbes, New South Wales
- Died: 30 June 1980 (aged 77); Sydney
- Known for: Qantas pilot/manager (1924–46); Locating lost Kookaburra (1929); TAA General Manager (1946–55)
- Awards: Officer of the Order of Australia; Air Force Cross; King's Commendation
- Aviation career
- Air force: Royal Australian Air Force
- Battles: World War II; South West Pacific theatre
- Rank: Wing Commander

Lester Joseph Brain, AO, AFC (27 February 1903 – 30 June 1980) was a pioneer Australian aviator and airline executive. Born in New South Wales, he trained with the Royal Australian Air Force (RAAF) before joining Queensland and Northern Territory Aerial Services (Qantas) as a pilot in 1924. He was awarded the Air Force Cross in 1929, after locating the lost aircraft Kookaburra in northern Australia. Having risen to Chief Pilot at Qantas by 1930, he was appointed Flying Operations Manager in 1938. As a member of the RAAF reserve, Brain coordinated his airline's support for the Australian military during World War II. He earned a King's Commendation for his rescue efforts during an air raid on Broome, Western Australia, in 1942, and was promoted to wing commander in 1944.

Seeing little prospect for advancement at Qantas once the war had ended, Brain left to join the fledgling government-owned domestic carrier Trans Australia Airlines (TAA) in June 1946. Appointed its first General Manager, he swiftly built up the organisation to the stage where it could commence scheduled operations later in the year. By the time he resigned in March 1955, TAA was firmly established as one half of the Commonwealth government's two-airline system. After his departure from TAA, Brain became Managing Director of de Havilland Aircraft in Sydney, before joining the board of East-West Airlines as a consultant in January 1961. He was appointed an Officer of the Order of Australia in January 1979 and died in June the following year, aged seventy-seven.

== Pre-war career ==
=== Early life ===
Born in Forbes, New South Wales, on 27 February 1903, Lester Brain was the second son of English mining engineer and manager, Austin Lionel Bennett Brain, and his Australian wife, Katherine Mary "Kitty" Brain, née Murray. Originally from Gloucestershire, Austin emigrated with his father, W. Blanch Brain, prospecting for gold in the United States before in 1885 settling in Australia. By age thirteen, Lester had his own motorcycle, bought secondhand for £11; its poor condition and constant need for repair helped him become mechanically adept at an early age. He completed his education at Sydney Grammar School, where he excelled in maths, before being employed by the Commercial Banking Company of Sydney (CBC) in 1919.

Brain's penchant for motorbikes and things mechanical inspired a lift driver at CBC to suggest he apply for pilot training in the recently formed Royal Australian Air Force (RAAF). He was among five civilian students nominated by the Civil Aviation Branch (CAB) of the Defence Department for entry into the inaugural RAAF flying training course, which commenced at Point Cook, Victoria in January 1923. The benefit of these nominations from a military perspective was that although the destiny of the CAB-sponsored students was to be civil aviators, they would also be members of the RAAF reserve, known as the Citizen Air Force (CAF), and could therefore be called up for active service as and when necessary. Brain's fellow trainees included Royal Australian Navy lieutenants Joe Hewitt and Ellis Wackett, and Australian Army lieutenant Frank Bladin, all of whom were seconded—and later permanently transferred—to the RAAF.

=== Qantas ===
Brain graduated at the top of his class after the year-long training course at Point Cook, and was duly commissioned in the CAF. Moving to Queensland in April 1924, he took up employment as a pilot with Queensland and Northern Territory Aerial Services (Qantas), its first aviator without a war record. On 7 February 1925, he flew the first scheduled passenger service from Cloncurry to Camooweal, extending the airline's founding 580-mile (930 km) route—from Charleville to Cloncurry—by 284 miles (457 km). The following year, he completed a refresher course at Central Flying School, Point Cook. On a rain-soaked McKinlay airfield near Cloncurry on 27 February 1927, he flipped Qantas' first de Havilland DH.50 on to its back while attempting take-off, though he managed to escape without injury. Qantas founder Hudson Fysh berated him for a "serious error of judgement", but noted his excellent three-year record as a pilot; the aircraft was soon repaired and operational again. The next month, Brain became Chief Instructor at the Qantas Flying School in Brisbane, doubling as manager of the airline's local office. By mid-1928, he had overworked himself to the extent that he was ordered to take respite by Fysh; this "respite" nevertheless involved a 13-week trip to England to study aviation developments.

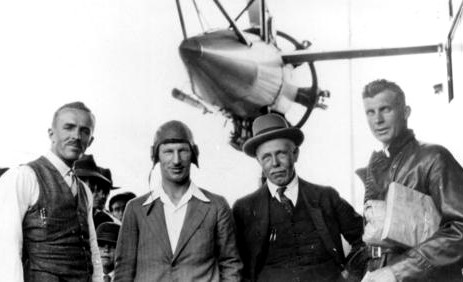
Brain (left) with Charles Kingsford Smith (second from left) in front of the Southern Cloud, c. 1930.

In April 1929, Brain was selected to take part in a search for lost aviators in northern Australia, having gained experience of the area while flying over the Tanami Desert to assist a gold prospecting expedition some years earlier. On 20 April, he took Qantas DH.50 Atalanta from Brisbane to link up with RAAF Airco DH.9s under the command of Flight Lieutenant Charles Eaton at Tennant Creek, to look for Keith Anderson and Robert Hitchcock in their Westland Widgeon the Kookaburra. The pair had disappeared while searching for Charles Kingsford Smith and Charles Ulm, who had been reported missing on a record attempt from Sydney to England in the Southern Cross. Brain located the Kookaburra the next day in the Tanami Desert, approximately 130 kilometres (81 mi) east-south-east of Wave Hill. He saw one body underneath the wing, but the terrain was too dangerous to attempt a landing. After Brain reported the Kookaburra's position to Eaton, the latter led an overland expedition to the site and buried the bodies of Anderson and Hitchcock, who had evidently survived crash-landing their plane before succumbing to heat and thirst. His discovery of the Kookaburra and, shortly thereafter, of two lost British aviators in Arnhem Land, earned Brain the Air Force Cross; the award was gazetted on 31 May:

The KING has been graciously pleased to approve of the award of the Air Force Cross to Mr. Leslie Joseph Brain, in recognition of the distinguished services rendered to aviation by his recent flights in the northern territory of Australia in search of missing aviators.

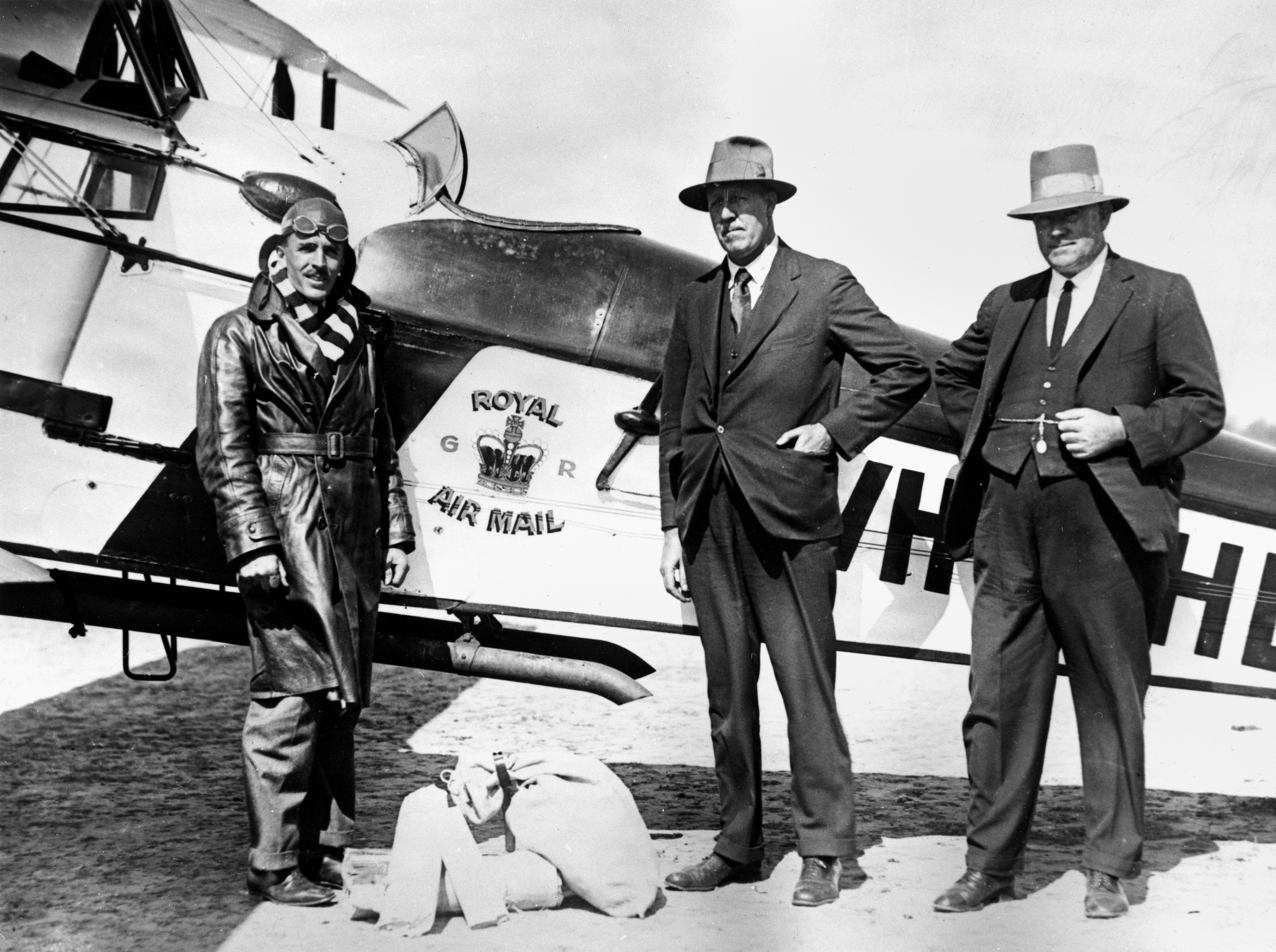
Brain presenting the Mayor of Rockhampton, Queensland, with its first delivery of air mail

The Gazette later corrected "Leslie" to "Lester". With the Kookaburra saga making news across the country, Brain had become a national hero, and Fysh declared that the publicity for both pilot and airline "could probably not have been bought for any money".

By 1930, Brain had been appointed Qantas' Chief Pilot. In June that year, he was given responsibility for sales and special flights such as demonstrations and agency tours at the airline's new Brisbane headquarters, and also acted as a reserve pilot. He married Constance (Consie) Brownhill at Holy Innocents Catholic Church in Croydon, New South Wales, on 8 July; the couple had two sons and two daughters. Brain played a leading role in Qantas' operations as it expanded its mail and passenger routes throughout Australia and, as Qantas Empire Airways (QEA) from January 1934, other parts of the world. In October that year, he went to Britain to take delivery of QEA's first de Havilland DH.86, the fastest four-engined airliner in the world at the time. He was now Flight Superintendent and, having accumulated 6,694 hours in the air, began to evince a keener interest in the "administration and executive side of aviation". Promoted to flying officer in the CAF on 1 March 1935, over the next year he discussed with the Controller-General of Civil Aviation, Edgar Johnston, taking a cut in salary to work in Johnston's department, or possibly becoming Deputy Controller-General. No more came of this at the time, and by 1938 Brain had been appointed Flying Operations Manager at QEA. In 1939, he was considered for the position of Director-General of Civil Aviation (which had recently succeeded the post of Controller-General) but the role went to A. B. Corbett.

== World War II ==
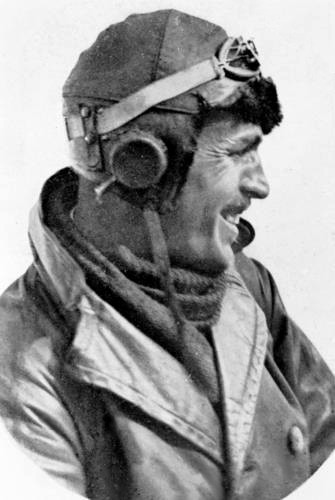
Undated profile of Brain

Following the outbreak of World War II, Brain was given the task of coordinating Qantas' support for the Australian military, which became known as the Qantas Merchant Air Service. On 23 February 1940, Fysh noted that since its formation in 1934, QEA had logged six million miles in flying boats and landplanes without suffering any injuries to passengers or crew. He called it "a record which has never been equalled in any part of the world ... It reflects the highest credit on Captain Brain, who has been in charge of flying operations during this time." In 1941, Brain took charge of ferrying eighteen PBY Catalinas from the United States to Australia on behalf of the RAAF, which had purchased the aircraft. US neutrality made it prudent for a civilian organisation—that was also experienced in long-range flying boat operations—to undertake the task. Brain and his crew departed San Diego, California, on 25 January to make the first flight, having surveyed their intended route on the journey out from Australia. Travelling via Honolulu, Canton Island and Nouméa, they arrived at their destination after one week, including sixty hours flying time; it was only the third such direct flight to Australia across the Pacific Ocean.

By February 1942, Brain was running the Qantas base at Broome in north Western Australia, which had assumed major importance as a way station for evacuees from the Dutch East Indies, possessing a harbour suitable for flying boats, as well as an airfield that could take heavy bombers. The increasing Royal Netherlands Air Force, RAAF and Qantas traffic through the base led Brain to anticipate an attack by Japanese forces, and this occurred on 3 March, when nine A6M Zero fighters strafed the harbour with cannon. Twenty-four aircraft were destroyed, and an estimated seventy people were killed. Brain, though suffering from fever, rowed into the harbour with another airline representative and rescued ten people from the water. After the all-clear sounded, he ordered an undamaged Qantas flying boat to Port Hedland, in case of further attacks; he also took part in the search for survivors of a Consolidated B-24 Liberator that had been shot down by the raiders. His rescue efforts were recognised with a King's Commendation for "brave conduct at Civil Aerodromes", promulgated in the Commonwealth of Australia Gazette on 17 June 1943. The following year, he was promoted to temporary wing commander in the CAF.

== Post-war career ==
=== Trans Australia Airlines ===
After the war, Brain was appointed Qantas' Assistant General Manager. Fysh was still in his early fifties and appeared unlikely to retire any time soon. Seeing little chance of further advancement where he was, Brain took the opportunity to apply for the position of Operations Manager at Trans Australia Airlines (TAA), a new domestic carrier established by the Federal Labor government and run by the Australian National Airlines Commission (ANAC), which was chaired by Arthur Coles. Qantas could not match the £2,250 salary associated with the TAA role, and Brain advised Fysh of his resignation on 10 April 1946. In the event, ANAC appointed him TAA's General Manager on 3 June, with a £3,000 salary and an undertaking to increase this to as much as £5,000 in the future.

Douglas DC-4 Skymaster John Eyre, which arrived for service with TAA in October 1946

Brain moved quickly to secure executive, flying, training and maintenance staff from Qantas, Ansett and the RAAF, as well as surplus Douglas DC-3 twin-engined transports from the RAAF and TAA's chief private competitor, Australian National Airways (ANA). He planned to have the first scheduled flights operating by October 1946, around the same time as delivery of four DC-4 Skymaster four-engined liners that would augment the DC-3 fleet, giving the airline a significant edge over ANA. In the event, TAA's first flight, from Melbourne to Sydney, took place on 9 September under pressure from the government, keen to ensure favourable publicity for its new enterprise before the Federal election at the end of the month. Brain's instruction to his pilots that "schedules are important, but safety is most important" became one of TAA's early advertising slogans. In October, he wrote to the Department of Civil Aviation to express his disquiet at the rapidly increasing list of government members who were to be given preferential treatment when required at the expense of members of the public, in effect arguing with his owner—the government—on behalf of everyday travellers.

On 1 July 1947, Brain was discharged from the CAF with the rank of wing commander. By August 1949, TAA had carried its millionth passenger. Though praised for contributing to increased civil traffic in Australia, the airline was losing money, generating criticism in media and political circles that it was an inefficient organisation propped up by ordinary taxpayers. Brain maintained that its negative financial performance in its early years was a necessary by-product of rapid expansion to establish itself as a significant force in the market. In June 1950, he was able to report its first profit. This, plus popular opinion in TAA's favour, helped ensure the airline's survival as a public enterprise in the wake of the Labor government's loss to Robert Menzies' conservative Liberal Party in the Federal election the previous year, though Coles was replaced as Chairman of ANAC by Norman Watt. By 1951, the new government had enacted as policy a two-airline system that enshrined competition between the Commonwealth-sponsored domestic operator and one major privately owned carrier.

=== Later life and legacy ===
He had a jaunty cockiness that inspired his staff when things were going badly for us all ... It may be that there exists a generation of Australians today who do not even recall Brain's name, but it is very certain that his place in aviation history is assured.

— Ian Sabey of ANAC on Lester Brain, 1979

Brain tendered his resignation from TAA on 3 February 1955—effective 17 March—to become Managing Director of de Havilland Aircraft in Sydney (later Hawker de Havilland, part of Boeing Australia). Although his departure came as a surprise to ANAC, Brain had for some time felt shackled by having to run TAA on a commercial basis under the control of a government bureaucracy, and on a public servant's remuneration. His anticipated salary increases had been less than he expected under the terms of his employment; Watt's attempts to make good on them had been resisted by Federal Cabinet. The government yet feared that, once he had resigned, Brain might attempt to sue for back pay, though he assured Watt that this was not his intention. Nevertheless, in November he received a Cabinet-approved ex gratia payment totalling £6,250, in recognition of his "long and distinguished service to civil aviation in Australia".

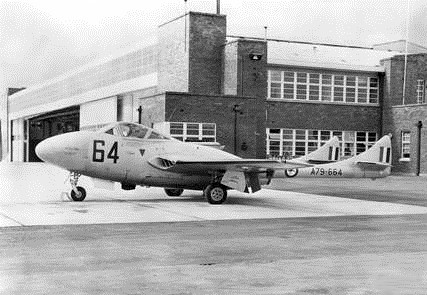
Vampire T35; sixty-nine were built for the RAAF by de Havilland while Brain was Managing Director

During Brain's tenure at de Havilland, the company manufactured sixty-nine Vampire T35 jet trainers at its Bankstown factory for delivery to the RAAF, as well as Sea Venoms for the RAN. Leaving de Havilland upon its merger with Hawker Siddeley in 1960, he gave up full-time work and joined the board of East-West Airlines as a consultant in January 1961. In August 1964, he began negotiations with the Federal government on behalf of International Parcels Express Company (now Toll Ipec), which was attempting to enter the air freight business in Australia with the purchase of five DC-4 Skymasters; the government rejected the proposal later that year. Along with Arthur Coles, Brain was a guest at the opening of TAA's new headquarters at Franklin Street, Melbourne in November 1965. In 1978, he met with adventurer Dick Smith, who was about to launch an expedition to recover the Kookaburra from the Tanami Desert. Smith was keen to get directions from the man who had found the missing plane in 1929, in spite of receiving advice against taking the word of someone from the "cap and goggles" era. He rediscovered the Kookaburra in August that year "exactly where Lester Brain had said ... Lester was completely chuffed when I got back and told him I'd found the Kookaburra thanks to his directions and how thankful I was that, despite everyone else's suggestions, I'd taken Lester's advice."

Brain had declined the offer of a knighthood in the late 1960s, but accepted appointment as an Officer of the Order of Australia on 26 January 1979. When asked towards the end of his life why he had achieved so much but was not as well known as other aviation pioneers, he replied "Because I was always very careful and didn't kill myself". Having suffered from cancer for several years, Brain died in Sydney on 30 June 1980. He was survived by his wife and children, and cremated. In November 2008, Qantas announced that one of its new Airbus A380s would be named Lester Brain.
