= O. W. Brain =

English engineer (c. 1866–1936)

Orlando William Brain M.I.E.E. (c. 1866 – 6 June 1936), usually referred to as O. W. Brain or O.W.B., was an English electrical engineer who had a considerable career in Australia, notably as chief electrical engineer in New South Wales Railways Department 1899–1924 and Assistant Railway Commissioner 1924–1932. He oversaw the development of Sydney's original tram network, which dwarfed that of Melbourne.

== History ==
Brain was born in Forest of Dean, Gloucestershire, second son of Elizabeth Brain (c. 1846 – 29 December 1929) and William Blanch Brain, M.I.E.E. (6 January 1843 – 22 June 1908), colliery proprietor and electrical engineering pioneer.

William Blanch Brain, often referred to as W. Blanch Brain, was inventor of "Brain's powder", a powerful explosive. He emigrated to Tasmania in 1885, accompanied by his son Austin Lionel Bennett Brain and his son-in-law, Arthur Legge Goold. Tasmanian newspapers reprinted several papers and articles about his experiences with dynamos and electric motors in British coalfields. and was soon occupied at Henry Mason's "Norwich" coalfields at Norfolk Plains, near Launceston, then was taken on as mine manager, known in mining parlance as "Captain Brain". He also went into private practice as Blanch, Brain & Co., consulting engineers.
In 1886, while living at Sandy Bay, he invented the Blanch-Brain butter churn.
In 1890, while living at "Abernethy", Hotham Street, St Kilda, Victoria, he and Arthur James Arnot developed and patented an electrically-powered rock drill, claimed to be the world's first electric drill, though it may have required two men to operate it. They patented an improved AC electric motor in 1891.
In 1892 he opened a course of instruction in electrical engineering at the Technical School, Launceston.
He was proved bankrupt in 1893 and left for Auckland, New Zealand, never to leave.

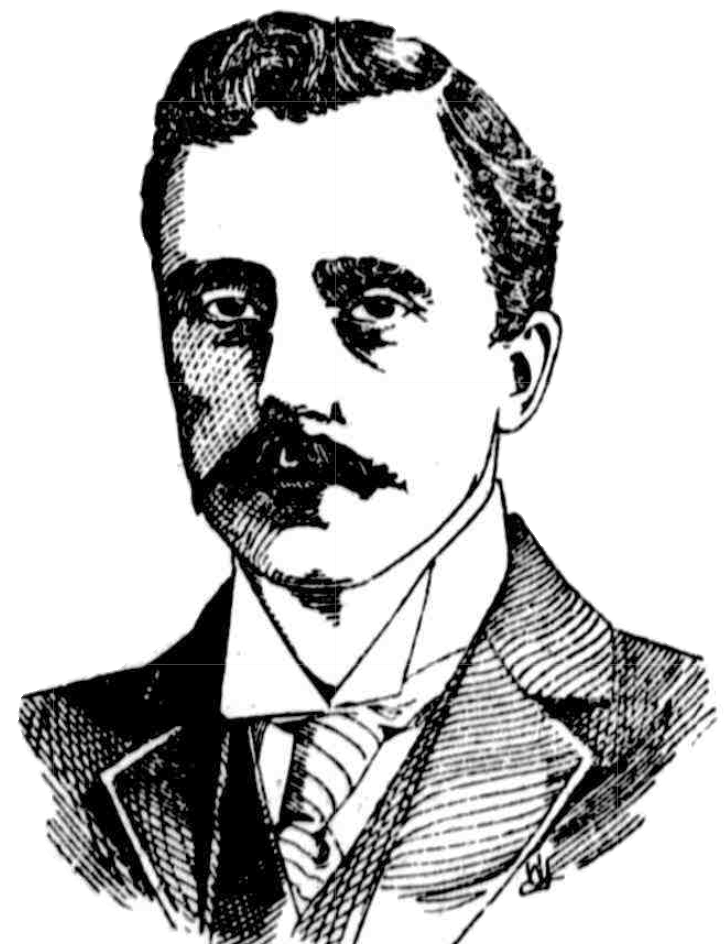
O. W. Brain

Brain was trained as an electrical engineer, and had experience in application of electricity to pumps in coal mines. He emigrated to Australia around 1885, following his father, brother, and A. L. Goold. and found work in Tasmania, most likely with his father. He moved to Melbourne in 1888, possibly with his mother, sisters and a younger brother, who also left for New Zealand.

Brain was appointed electrician by the Tamworth Council in 1889 and tasked with replacing their gas and kerosene street lamps with incandescent and arc lamps, the generator being driven by a steam engine, with a similar setup as backup. Tamworth was the first Australian town to have streets lit by electricity.

He was next employed by Crompton Electric Supply Company of Australia Ltd (founded 1889), installing generator plant in mines and factories. He worked with Professor Threlfall of Sydney University in the electrical engineering involved in providing hydroelectric power to the mines and town of Hillgrove, the first Australian town to be lit by water power. Brain left the Crompton Electric Co. in July 1896 to join the NSW Railways Department as chief assistant to P. B. Elwell, who was overseeing the electrification of Sydney trams.

Electric trams in Sydney
Successful trials were made between Botany and Darlinghurst in 1888 of a tram, supplied by contractor Edward Pritchard, with its steam engine replaced by electric motors and a lead-acid battery. The battery weighed over a ton, and its charge lasted around seven hours, when it would be exchanged for a freshly-charged one. But the self-contained electric tram, with the battery technology of the day, was unlikely to succeed, and Pritchard never won the contract. (Note: Brain later alluded to the "self-contained accumulator tram" and the "conduit system" in defending the "trolley-car" and its overhead wiring.)

In 1890 a test section of overhead line was erected from the Randwick tram sheds to Waverley for trialling American cars by Thomson-Houston. Power was supplied by a generator in the tram shed. More permanent supplies were opened in Ultimo in 1897, Rushcutters Bay and Ridge Street, North Sydney, the latter two previously cable car stations.
Electrification began in earnest with the North Sydney service in September 1893, and the manufacture of electric tramcars began in 1896. Electric cars ran in Elizabeth Street from 1895 and work began on an electric tramway from Circular Quay to Redfern Station and along Harris Street to Pyrmont. In 1897 more lines were installed from Spit Road to Mosman and in 1898 Willoughby and Rose Bay. Then from 1900 existing steam tram lines and the few cable-tram lines were made over to electric traction — George Street from Circular Quay to Pyrmont, Dulwich Hill, Pitt Street and Castlereagh Street, Circular Quay to Redfern Station in 1901 — completed the changeover.

Elwell died on 10 September 1899 and Brain succeeded to the position, made permanent in December 1899. Brain was appointed chief electrical engineer in the Railway Department, and in 1902 was sent by the department on a world fact-finding tour to investigate railways practices in England, Europe and the USA.

Brain was the first lecturer in Electrical Engineering at Sydney, retiring 1903 on account of pressure of departmental duties.

He represented New South Wales at the International Railway Conference at Bern, Switzerland, in 1910.

A power station at White Bay was commenced in 1912 to supplement that at Ultimo, its completion being delayed by the Great War. These plants not only provided power for the trains and trams, but for much of the city's lights, industry, and residential use. In 1924 Brain predicted that another power house would be required by 1930.

In 1925 Cabinet appointed Brain and A. D. J. Forster as Assistant Railway Commissioners to Chief Railway Commissioner William James Cleary.

In 1930 the Lang parliament passed an amendment to the Industrial Arbitration (Eight Hours) Act, which came into force January 1931, giving Cabinet the power to suspend payment to the Railway Commissioners in line with "rationing" of working hours, used to counter some of the effects of the Great Depression. "Rationing" could not however prevent them from exercising their powers, even when stood down.

He retired in January 1932. He died at his home in Killara, and his remains were privately cremated.

== Recognition ==
He was elected president of the Electrical Association of New South Wales in 1900 and 1912 and in 1915 unanimously elected foundation president of its successor, the Electrical Association of Australia, later a section of the Institution of Engineers of Australia.

Brain Street, Monash, ACT, was named for him.

== Family ==
Brain married Amy Foxton Robertson of Wollongong on 29 December 1894. They had two sons:

- Vivian James Foxton Brain (26 August 1896 – 11 June 1957), born in Wollongong, gained his engineering degree in Sydney, then studied in America. He was electrical engineer with NSW Public Works Department, later vice-chairman of the Electricity Commission of NSW and senior adviser to the Australian Atomic Energy Commission.
- Geoffrey Brain (born 13 June 1905 at "Derwin", Double Bay), railways employee

They had a home, "Winslow", on Greengate Road, Killara.

Siblings

Florence Aureola Brain (c. 1863 – 22 July 1897) was a sister. She may have come out on the SS Dupleix in 1889. She was married to engineer Arthur Legge Goold, had daughter (Violet ?) on 25 April 1886. She died at her parents' home, in Parnell, Auckland, New Zealand,

Austin Lionel Bennett Brain (c. 1865 – 8 September 1920) was an elder brother. In 1888 he came to Victoria, and took charge of the Coalville colliery in Gippsland, the first good coal found in Victoria. The following year he surveyed the West Wallsend coal mine New South Wales. In 1890 he was manager of the Latrobe mine. and the East Coast mine, Tasmania in 1892. In 1898 he was manager of the South-West Curtin-Davis mine; in 1899 he was appointed mining manager of the 60-acre block mine in Gundagai, followed by Forbes, Hermidale and Cobar. On 5 December 1900 in Gunning, New South Wales, he married Katherine Mary "Kitty" Murray (died 13 February 1941). They had a home, "St Annals" on The Boulevarde, Punchbowl Road, Enfield, New South Wales. They had two sons, Lionel Esmond Brain (28 October 1901 – 5 November 1974) and Lester Joseph Brain (27 February 1903 – 30 June 1980). of CSR and the Commercial Bank respectively. Both were notable aviators.

=== Possibly related ===
Carl Thomas Blanch Brain, of Devonport Cottage, Helsby, Chester, England, in 1891 patented an improved form of electrical conduit for tramways and railways. This may be the type of power reticulation referred to as an alternative to overhead lines.
