= Spencer Street Power Station =

Coal-fired power station in Melbourne, Australia

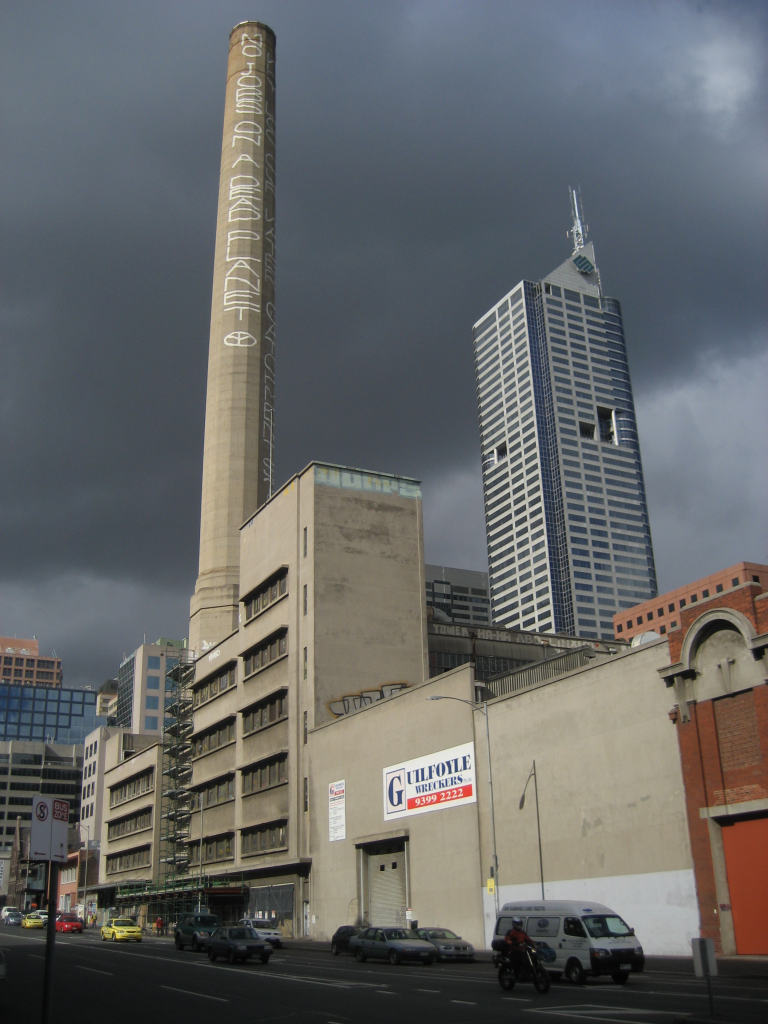
- The power station undergoing demolition in 2007
- Country: Victoria, Australia
- Location: Spencer Street, Melbourne,
- Coordinates: 37°48′53″S 144°57′12″E
- Status: Closed & Demolished
- Commission date: 1894
- Decommission date: 1982

Thermal power station
- Primary fuel: Coal, oil

External links
- Commons: Related media on Commons

Spencer Street Power Station was a Victorian era coal and (later) oil-fired power station which operated on Spencer Street in central Melbourne, Victoria, Australia. The station was opened in 1894 in order to power electric street lights, then supplied power to the city's residents, as well as being a wholesale supplier to other municipal distributors. It came under the management of the State Electricity Commission of Victoria in 1941. By the 1960s the capacity of the station reached 109 MW, but was used only for peak load. The station was closed in 1982 after becoming redundant. Eventually deemed an eyesore, demolition commenced in 2006 and was completed in 2008, and a large residential and retail development called Upper West Side was completed on the site by 2016.

== History ==
Spencer Street Power Station was built by the City of Melbourne to supply electricity to the city, initially to provide street lighting, opening in 1894. Arthur James Arnot designed and managed Spencer Street power station from 1894 to 1901 for the Melbourne City council.

The first power plant, later known as A station, consisted of 24 General Electric direct current (DC) generators installed in four groups of six. Each group was belt driven by a 300HP Austral Otis horizontal compound slow speed steam engine. The terminal voltage was 3 kV DC and the electricity was used for street lights, trams, lifts and city buildings. Steam was supplied from four Babcock & Wilcox water tube boilers. In 1897 four General Electric 75 kW alternators were added. They were belt driven by the existing engines. Output was 2 kV and 72 Hz. In 1900 a Peach three-crank compound 2500HP steam engine was installed. It was coupled to a Johnson & Phillips 120 kW alternator. The alternating current (AC) was used in the surrounding suburbs via transformers. 1905 saw further expansion with one 200 kW alternator, 4x350 kW vertical Belliss steam engines that were direct-coupled to DC generators at 460 V DC. This was to augment the city supply. Steam was supplied by another four Babcock boilers.

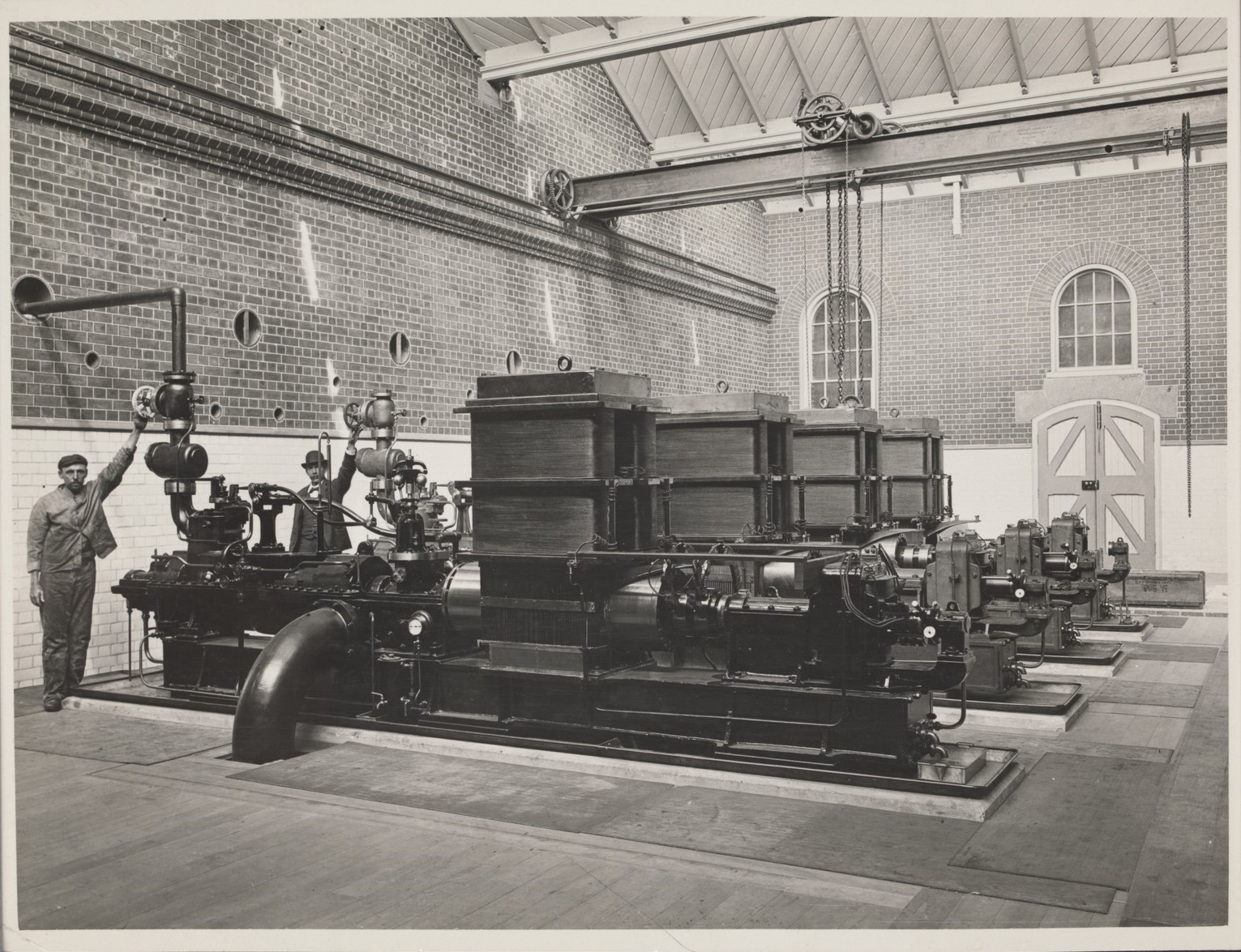
Engine room of the Spencer Street Power Station in 1902

In 1907 the first turbines were installed, with two 750 kW British Westinghouse Parsons 4.4 kV single-phase machines added. The old arc lighting plant was removed to provide the space. 1908 saw three Allen triple-expansion engines installed, each coupled to 750 kW generator and more boilers. A Siemens 4.4 MW 6.6 kV three-phase alternator was added in 1913. Next year, two William Robinson 5 MW turbo-alternators were added. 1917 saw the further addition of a 6.5 MW turbo-alternator from British Westinghouse. This was a three-phase, 6.6 kV 50 Hz machine, and ran at 1500 RPM. To accommodate these changes, the in 1907 the original manager's residence and offices on the corner of Little Bourke Street were replaced by a large chimney and coal facility (this chimney was dismantled in the 1970s and reconstructed at the Williamstown Railway Museum, and the corner used as a coal yard). In 1908 an office building facing Spencer Street replaced the front part of the 1894 turbine hall, and the Economiser Building was constructed in the same year attached to the engine room which ran along Little Bourke Street. They were both designed by the Melbourne Electricity Supply Department in a red brick Edwardian style.

In 1927 four 6 MW three-phase 6.6 kV turbo-alternators were installed. At this time all the DC generators were replaced with motor-generators generators. By 1923 there were a total of 20 Babcock water tube boilers, each having a steam capacity of 17,000 lb/hr at 165PSI and 520 °F (271 °C). Smoke was directed into two smoke stacks each 175 feet (53 m) high.

Also in the 1927, the site become home to the power source for the hydraulic power system of pressurised water which had operated city elevators and hoists since 1887, operating from a site in the wharf area. An original cast iron water tank was relocated here to serve the remaining lifts on the system, which finally closed down in the 1967.

In 1941 the station came under the management of the State Electricity Commission of Victoria and became part of the state electricity network.

In 1949 two 15 MW Parsons turbo-generators were installed in an adjacent site, known as B station. Steam was supplied by large oil-fired water tube boilers. Ten years later two 30MW Parsons machines were added and called C station. Steam was supplied by more water-tube boilers that were fitted with pulverized fuel equipment for burning coal, but for pollution reasons they were only oil fired. A new office section was added to the station on the Lonsdale Street side which included a tall chimney in 1950s, all built in bare reinforced concrete.

Progressive upgrades saw the capacity of the station rise to 109 MW by the 1960s, but newer power stations in the Latrobe Valley meant that the station was retained for peak use only.

== Abandonment and demolition ==
After closure in 1982, the power station sat idle awaiting redevelopment. In 2003 a man was arrested for painting the slogan 'No jobs on a dead planet' on the chimney. A girl died in 2004 after falling down a seven-metre hole inside the power station.

By the 2000s the long abandoned site was seen as an eyesore. In May 2006 the site was sold for $7.6 million to Russian developers Vladimir Stepanov, Dmitri Bril and Oleg Mogilnitskiy, with asbestos removal and demolition commencing soon after to allow the redevelopment of the site. The chimney started being dismantled in September 2007 and the site was fully cleared by April 2008, with the exception of the Edwardian office building an economiser hall around the corner of Spencer and Little Bourke Streets, and the hydraulic power water tank, which had been added to the Victorian Heritage Register in 2007. In that year the site was sold to Far East Consortium, and plans for a four tower development with 2500 apartments were approved in 2010. These included the retention of only the exterior walls of the 1908 office building, the placing of columns through the roof of the Economiser building, and the retention of the water tank in place with new steel supports over a laneway entry to the site. The development known as Upper West Side was completed by 2016.

== Gallery ==
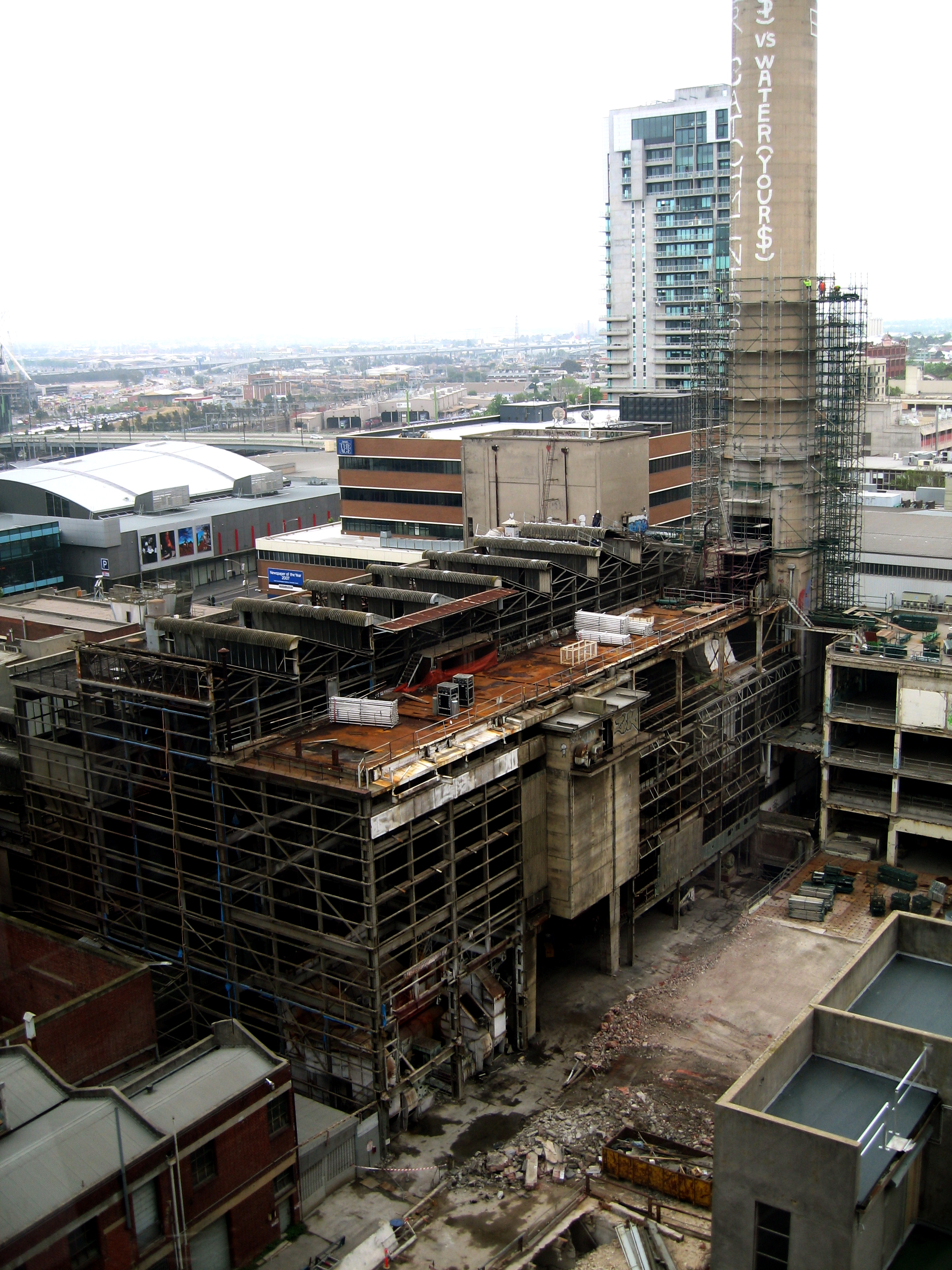
Demolition in October 2007

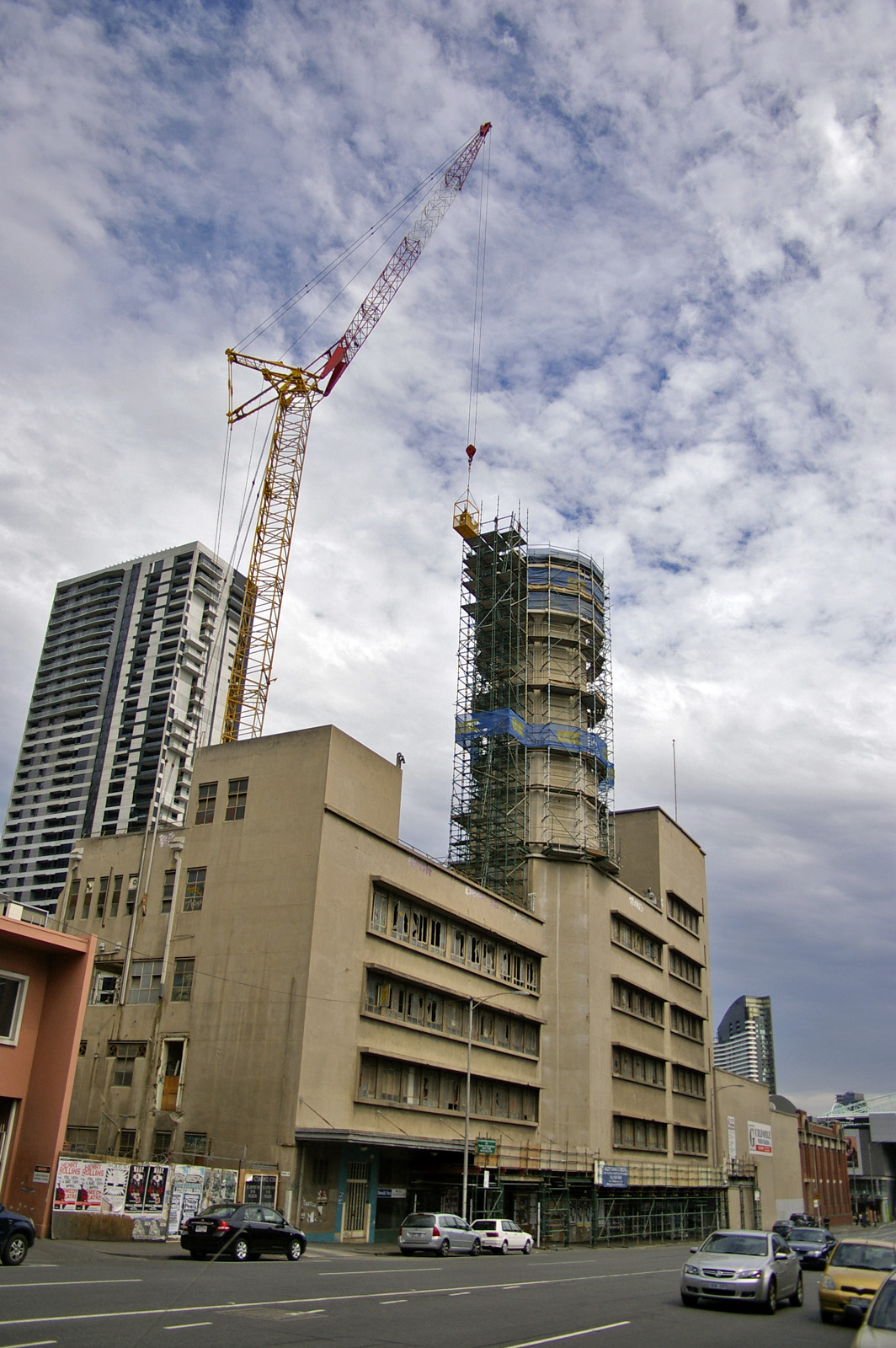
Demolition in March 2008

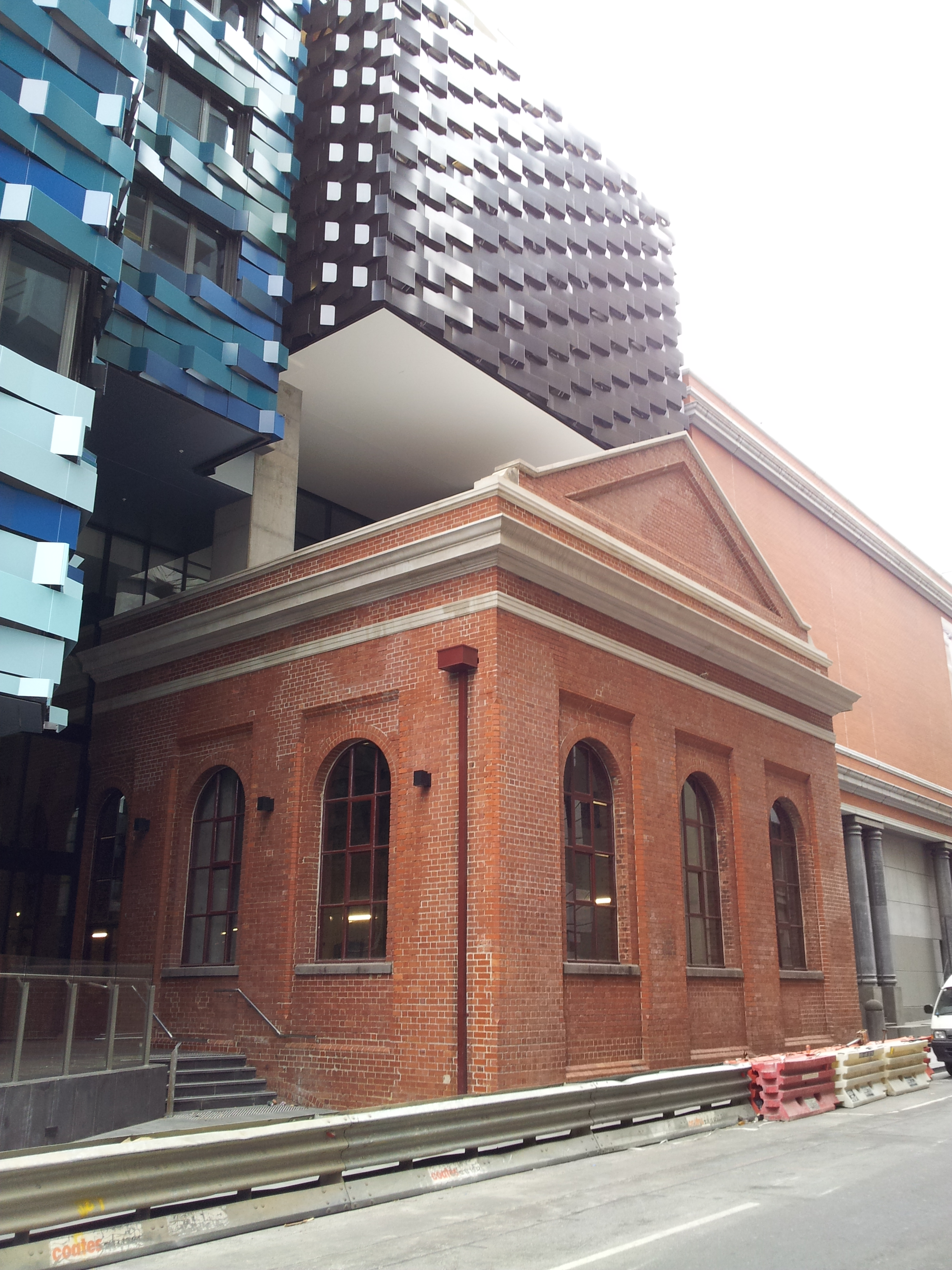
Economiser Building after redevelopment

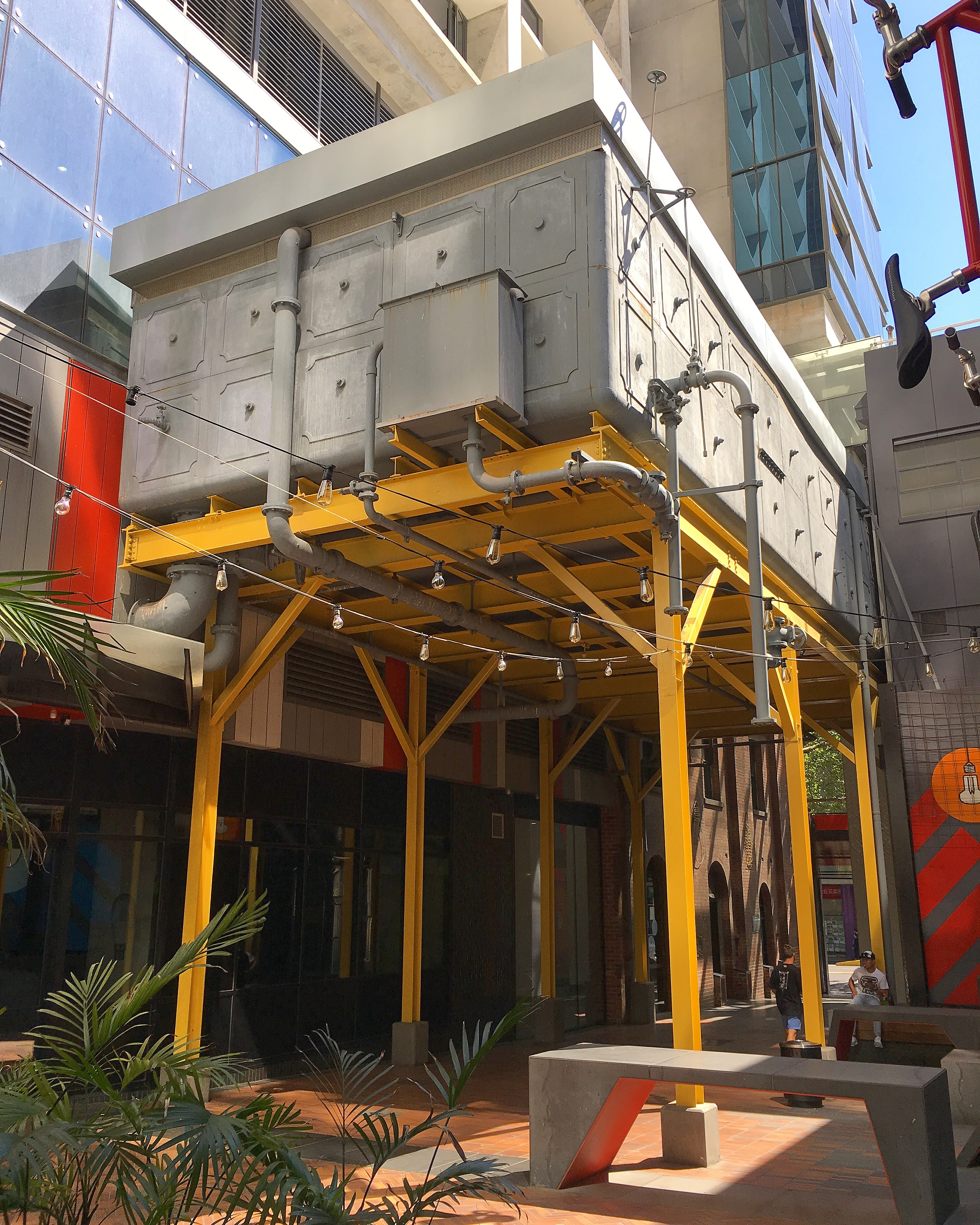
Hydraulic power system water tank after redevelopment

== Bibliography ==
- Edwards, Cecil (1969). Brown Power. A jubilee history of the SECV. State Electricity Commission of Victoria.
