= Arthur James Arnot =

Scottish electrical engineer and inventor (1865–1946)

- Born: 26 August 1865; Hamilton, Scotland
- Died: 15 October 1946 (aged 81)
- Known for: electric drill

Arthur James Arnot (26 August 1865 – 15 October 1946) was a Scottish electrical engineer and inventor, best known for patenting the world's first electric drill. He later designed the Spencer Street Power Station.

== Biography ==
Arnot was born in Hamilton, Scotland to William and Elizabeth Helen Arnot. He received his education at the West of Scotland Technical College, Glasgow, while working part-time at an electrical company. In 1889 he traveled to Melbourne, Australia to build the alternating current power plant at Spencer Street. The same year, on 20 August, he and mining engineer W. Blanch Brain patented the electric drill. Originally on a two-year contract by the Union Electric Company, Arnot was appointed City Electrical Engineer in 1891. During the first two years of this tenure he was responsible for the installation of the city's street lighting system. In the years 1894–1901, he designed and later managed the Spencer Street Power Station. From 1901 to 1929 Arnot held the position of Australasian Manager of Babcock & Wilcox.

In 1928, one year before his retirement, Arnot became involved in a corruption scandal over a May 1926 contract acquired by Babcock & Wilcox. The investigation revealed that alderman S. J. Maling had demanded a £10,000 bribe. Arnot, who represented Babcock & Wilcox in the negotiations, was admonished, and the company was fined. Maling received a six-month prison sentence.

== Personal life ==
Arnot married Cornelia Ann, daughter of former mayor Cornelius Job Ham, in August 1889. They had four children. He later married Dora Christine, née Shewan, with whom he had two children Wendy Barbara and David Macdonald. In his later years, Arnot acquired a farm in Batlow, New South Wales. Originally intended for his two sons, the 100 acres (0.40 km^{2}) of apple and pear trees were tended by Arnot, after his sons turned to sheep farming. He is described as a "keen fisherman", and was also a member of the Royal Sydney Golf Club.
