= Clyde A. Wheeler =

American congressional relations expert, lobbyist, and White House staffer (1921–2013)

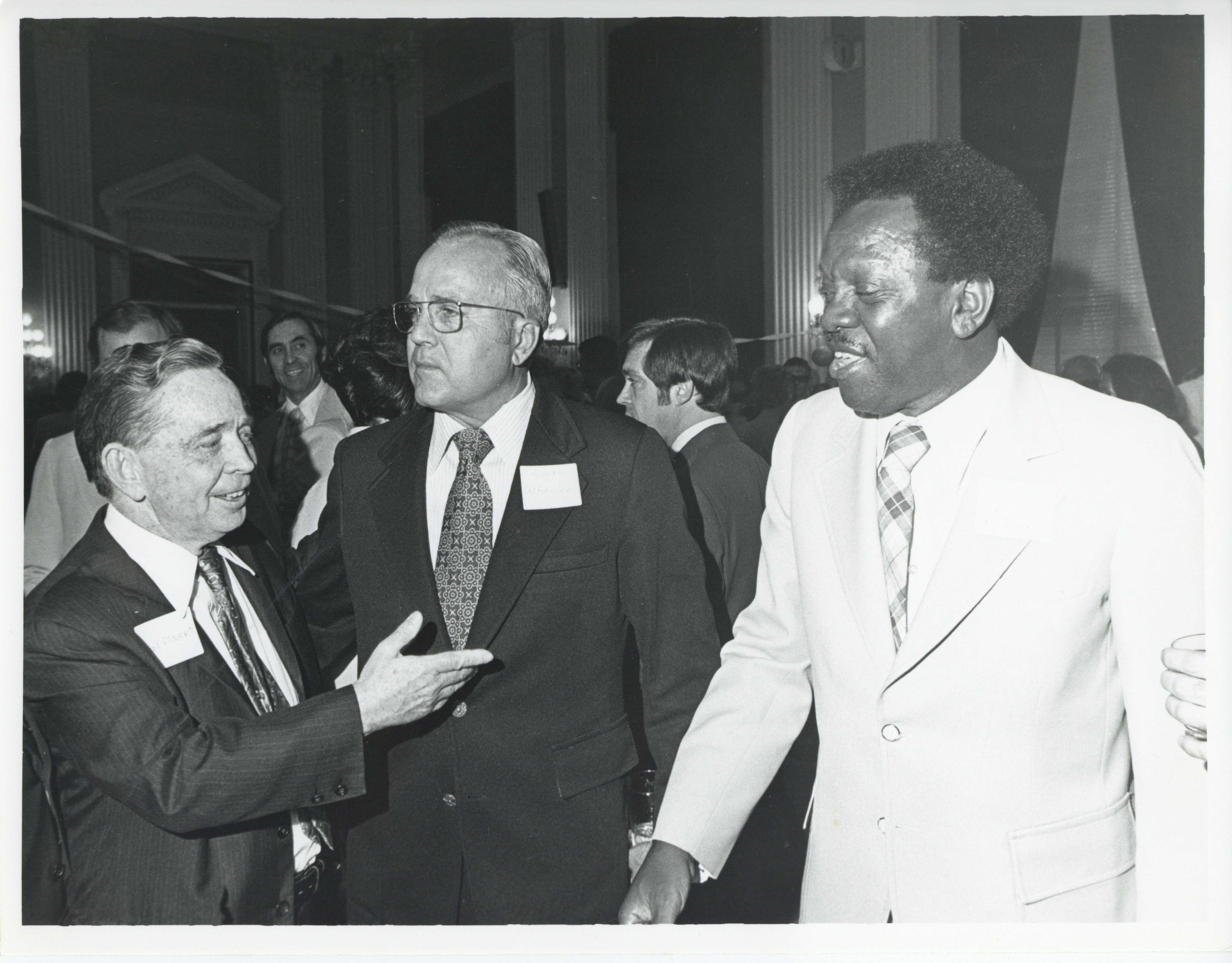
- Wheeler (middle) with Carl Albert (left).
- Born: Clyde Arlie "C. A." Wheeler, Jr. March 12, 1921; Laverne, Oklahoma, U.S.
- Died: August 26, 2013 (aged 92); Laverne, Harper County, Oklahoma
- Occupations: Businessman, politician
- Political party: Republican

Clyde A. Wheeler (March 12, 1921 – August 26, 2013) was an American congressional relations expert, lobbyist, and member of the White House staff. After leaving the White House staff, he returned to Oklahoma, where he settled in Tulsa and became a lobbyist for Sun Oil Company. He retired from Sun in 1984 and returned to his ranch in his home town of Laverne, Oklahoma. He continued to do part-time work as a consultant for two Washington law firms until 1988. He died in Laverne in 2013.

== Biography ==
=== Early life ===
Wheeler was born in Laverne, Oklahoma, on March 12, 1921. His parents were Clyde A. Wheeler, Sr. and Lulu Rector Wheeler. After finishing high school, he attended American Business School in Wichita, Kansas, while working at several part-time jobs. His first full-time job was as office manager and clearance officer at the Wichita Municipal Airport. Entering the United States Navy in 1942, he served for the rest of World War II. After his discharge in 1946, he enrolled in Oklahoma State University–Stillwater (OSU), then known as Oklahoma Agricultural & Mechanical University, from which he received the B. A. degree in History and M. A. degree in Government.

=== Entry into politics ===
After working at a variety of jobs in Kansas and Oklahoma, following his graduation from OSU, he developed an interest in Republican politics, and was hired by the Oklahoma Republican State Central committee in 1950 to help manage the state’s Republican campaign of that year. A major result of the campaign was the election of Page Henry Belcher to the United States House of Representatives. Because of Wheeler’s work in the 1950 campaign, Belcher invited him to Washington, D.C., to organize his office staff. Wheeler spent three years as Belcher’s executive secretary. He handled Belcher’s public relations, and helped manage Belcher’s district and Washington, D.C., offices. Wheeler was also active in the Young Republicans and was elected vice chairman of the national organization in 1953.

In February 1954, Ross Rizley, a Republican from Oklahoma who was serving as Assistant Secretary of Agriculture, invited Wheeler to the United States Department of Agriculture. Wheeler became Rizley’s confidential assistant and helped him manage Republican patronage in the department. In March 1955, Wheeler transferred to the office of Ezra Taft Benson, the United States Secretary of Agriculture, where he joined Benson’s congressional liaison staff. His success in working with members of Congress attracted the attention of Bryce Harlow who was a member of President Dwight D. Eisenhower’s congressional liaison staff at the White House. In February 1959, Harlow arranged to have Wheeler join the White House staff as a staff assistant to the President. Wheeler continued his congressional liaison work and specialized in legislation related to agriculture.

As the Eisenhower administration neared its end, Wheeler, who wanted to return to Oklahoma, received a job offer from the Sunray Mid-Continent Oil Company (now Sunoco) of Tulsa, Oklahoma. However, a political opportunity arose which Wheeler was unable to resist. Oklahoma's 6th congressional district, which included his home town of Laverne, was represented by Toby Morris. In the 1960 campaign Morris was defeated for reelection in the primary by former congressman Victor Wickersham. Although the district was heavily Democratic, the bitter primary campaign left the Democrats badly split and it appeared likely that the Republicans could capture the seat. When the Republican candidate withdrew from the race in August, the party leadership in the district appealed to Wheeler to represent the party in the election.

=== Campaigning for office ===
After some initial hesitation, Wheeler accepted the challenge. He resigned from the White House staff at the end of August and returned to Oklahoma where he spent the next two months campaigning actively for the Congressional seat. When the election was held on November 8, Wheeler was found to have won by only 188 votes. Wickersham, however, refused to accept such a narrow defeat and demanded a recount. When the votes were counted a second time several tallying errors were found which shifted a number of votes to Wickersham’s favor. This was enough to give Wickersham the election. In mid-December Wickersham was declared the winner, much to the surprise of Wheeler, who had been assigned office space at the House of Representatives and was preparing for the move back to Washington. (Note: After Wheeler's death, Tom Cole, long-time representative member of the House of Representatives from Oklahoma, said, "... Clyde Wheeler was a respected Republican leader, an ardent advocate for rural Oklahoma and strong proponent for energy independence. He may be the best congressman Oklahoma never had.") The opening at Sunray Oil was still available, so Wheeler settled instead at Tulsa and took up his new job in January 1961.

As Public Affairs Representative at Sunray Oil, Wheeler’s main job was to follow state and national legislation which affected Sunray Oil and the oil industry. He also developed an educational program to encourage Sunray’s employees to participate in the political process. Outside of work Wheeler was active in community affairs. He taught Sunday school and supported Goodwill Industries and other charitable organizations in the Tulsa area. In December 1964 Governor Henry Bellmon appointed him to the Oklahoma State Board of Regents, which developed policy for the state’s colleges and universities. (Note: Bellmon was the first Republican elected Oklahoma's governor in the state's history.)

During 1968 and 1969, Sunray Oil merged with the Sun Oil Company of Pennsylvania. Wheeler was on the committee which helped combine the public affairs offices of the two companies. In 1970 the reorganized company, Sun Oil Incorporated, sent him to Washington, D.C., to take charge of its government relations office. As Vice President for Government Relations, Wheeler was basically a lobbyist who worked with Congress and officials of the Executive branch of government to develop legislation favorable to the oil industry. He helped channel contributions from Sun Oil’s Political Action Committee to Congressional candidates who were known to favor the oil industry. He also helped direct charitable contributions by the company to various cultural and educational organizations in the Washington, D.C., area, such as the Center for Strategic and International Studies at Georgetown University, the Vietnam Veterans Memorial and Ford's Theatre.

In April 1984 Wheeler retired from Sun Oil and returned to his ranch at Laverne, Oklahoma. He continued to work part-time as a legislative consultant to two Washington law firms until 1988.

=== Personal ===
Clyde met Barbara Ann Dodd in 1951, and the two married August 23, 1953, in Enid, Oklahoma. Barbara was born November 7, 1922. They had two daughters and a son. Barbara died on February 20, 2003. Clyde died on August 28, 2013.
