= Interprovincial Council of Santander, Palencia and Burgos =

Republican governing body based in Santander during the Spanish Civil War

Interprovincial Council of Santander, Palencia and Burgos Spanish: Consejo Interprovincial de Santander, Palencia y Burgos
- Autonomous entity of Spanish Republic
- 1937
- Coat of arms

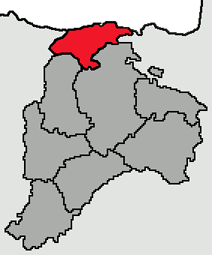
- Location of Santander (red) within Old Castile
- Capital: Santander
- Status: Autonomous entity
- Government: Interprovincial Council
  - Type: Council republic
- President
  - 1937: Juan Ruiz Olazarán
- Vice-President
  - 1937: Alfonso Orallo Pérez
  - 1937: Vicente del Solar Romero
- Historical era: Spanish Civil War
  - Santander Defense Council established: 27 July 1936
  - Established: 8 February 1937
  - Battle of Santander begins: 14 August 1937
  - Disestablished: 26 August 1937
  - Battle of Santander ends: 17 September 1937
- Subdivisions
  - Type: Province
  - Units: Santander, Palencia, Burgos
Preceded by	Succeeded by
Second Spanish Republic	Spanish State

The Interprovincial Council of Santander, Palencia and Burgos was a governing body established on 8 February 1937 to coordinate the Republican areas in Cantabria (then officially called the Province of Santander), Palencia and Burgos during the Spanish Civil War. The council was dissolved in August 1937 after the occupation of the region by Nationalist forces.

== Creation of the Interprovincial Council ==
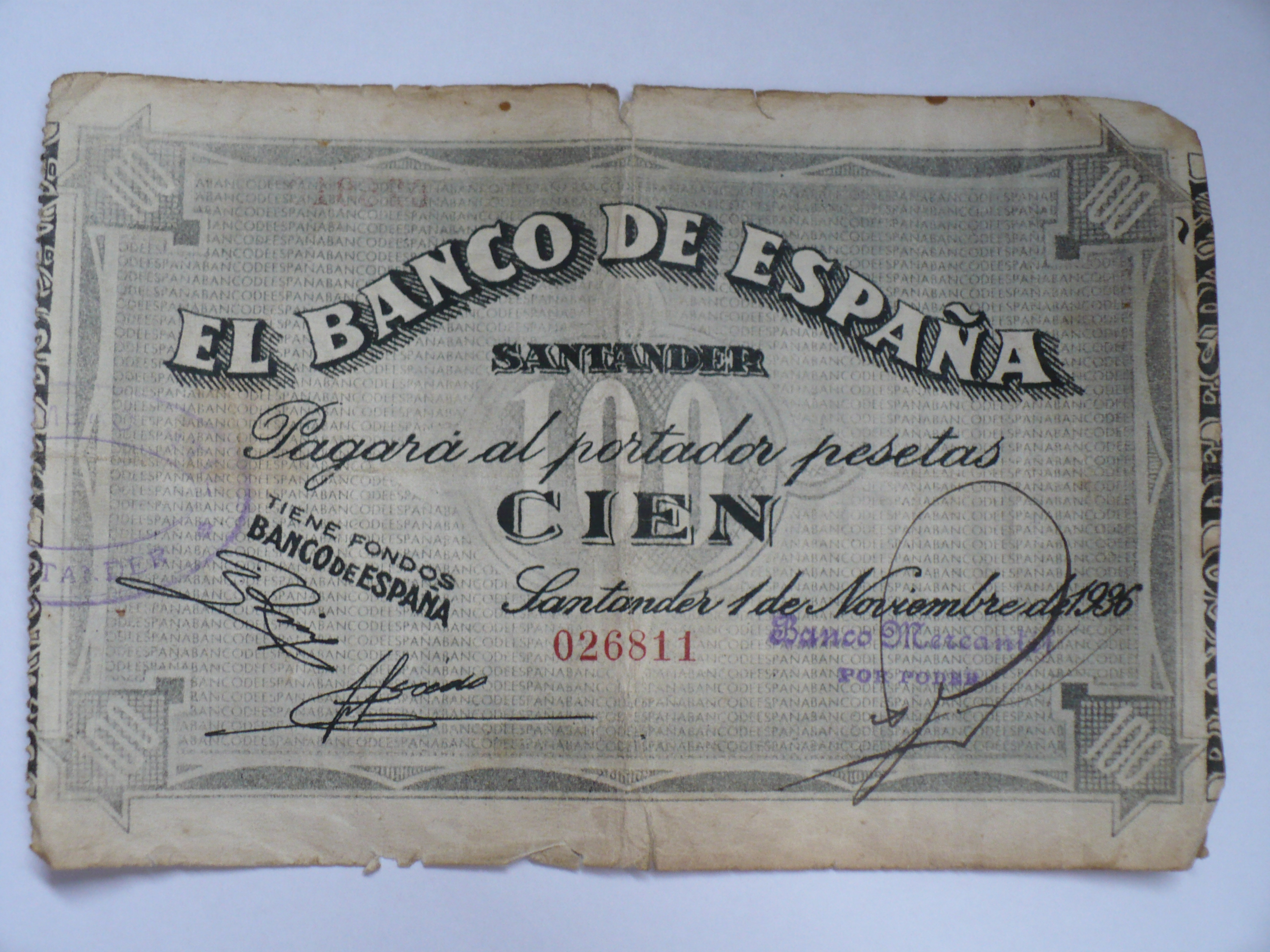
Prior to the constitution of the Interprovincial Council, the Bank of Spain in Santander issued banknotes of different denominations; later the Council minted coins of one peseta and fifty cents.

With the outbreak of war in July 1936, Cantabria and the northern parts of Palencia and Burgos remained under Republican control, as well as the neighboring Asturias and Biscay, while most of Castilla fell under nationalist rule. On 27 July, a "War Committee" was formed to direct the war effort, while the "Santander Defense Council" was in charge of directing the regional government.

On 23 December, the government of the Spanish Republic decided to create three Interprovincial Councils to replace the Defense Councils in Asturias and León, Santander, Palencia and Burgos, and Aragon. Following this order of the central government, the Interprovincial Council of Santander, Palencia and Burgos was officially constituted on 8 February 1937.

The government of the Republic delegated to the Council all functions except those of law enforcement, press and radio censorship, as well as meetings and public demonstrations. Among other functions, the Council assisted refugees from neighboring provinces, evacuated children and refugees, provided food and weapons, and minted its own currency.

== Composition of the Interprovincial Council ==
Following the guidelines of the Government of the Republic that determined that the number of councilors was double that of the provincial deputies, The Interprovincial Council was made up of fourteen members, two of them from the Spanish Socialist Workers' Party (Spanish: Partido Socialista Obrero Español, PSOE), two from Mountain Workers Federation-General Union of Workers (Spanish: Federación Obrera Montañesa-Unión General de Trabajadores, FOM-UGT), two from the Republican Left (Spanish: Izquierda Republicana, IR), two from the National Confederation of Labor (Spanish: Confederación Nacional del Trabajo, CNT), two from the Communist Party of Spain (Spanish: Partido Comunista de España, PCE), one from the Unified Socialist Youth (Spanish: Juventudes Socialistas Unificadas, JSU), one from the Federal Democratic Republican Party (Spanish: Partido Republicano Democratico Federal, PRD Fed.), one from the Republican Union (Spanish: Unión Republicana, UR) and one from the Iberian Anarchist Federation (Spanish: Federación Anarquista Ibérica, FAI). This composition resulted in six Socialists, four Republicans, three Anarchists and two Communists, of whom four belonged to the trade unions.

On 10 February 1937, the distribution of portfolios of the council was published in the Official Gazette of the Province:

Cabinet Position	Office Holder	Political Party or Trade Union
President	Juan Ruiz Olazarán	PSOE
First Vice-President	Alfonso Orallo Pérez	FOM-UGT
Second Vice-President / Minister of Popular Credit	Vicente del Solar Romero	CNT
Minister of Agriculture	Ángel Escobio Andraca	PCE
Minister of Social Assistance	Antonio Lavín Gautier	IR
Minister of Culture	Ramón Ruiz Rebollo	IR
Foreign Minister	Manuel Ramos Helguera	PRD Fed.
Minister of Livestock	Mariano Juez Sánchez	PCE
Minister of Finance	Domingo José Samperio Jáuregui	UR
Minister of the Interior	Feliciano Lanza	PSOE
Minister of Public Works	Antonio Vayas Gutiérrez	FOM-UGT
Minister of Propaganda	Teodoro Quijano Arbizu	FAI
Minister of Health and Hygiene	Timoteo Chapero Fernández	CNT
General Secretary	Julio Sollet (until February 18); Luis Doalto (from February 18)	JSU
Minister of Transport	José Martín del Castillo	PSOE

== End of Council ==
The end of the Interprovincial Council came with the military setbacks of the republican forces in the summer of 1937. The last agreements made during those days corresponded to a request for arms for the defense of the region and food with which to alleviate the situation of the population, aggravated by the arrival of refugees from the nationalist-occupied areas.

With the fall of Santander on 26 August 1937 and the evacuation of the authorities to Asturias, the council was dissolved.

== See also ==
- Regional Defence Council of Aragon
- Sovereign Council of Asturias and León

== Bibliography ==
- Ruiz Martínez, J.R. (1985). Consejo Interprovincial de Santander, Palencia y Burgos, El (in Spanish) (Edit. Cantabria SA ed.). Santander: Gran Enciclopedia de Cantabria. pp. 35–36. ISBN 84-86420-03-2.
