= Tang Chang =

Thai artist and poet (1934–1990)

- Born: May 1, 1934; Bangkok, Thailand
- Died: August 26, 1990 (aged 56); Bangkok, Thailand
- Known for: Painter; Poet

Tang Chang (Thai: จ่าง แซ่ตั้ง;Chinese: 陈壮;RTGS: Chang Sae-tang; 1 May 1934 – 26 August 1990) was a self-taught artist, poet, writer and philosopher of Sino-Thai heritage.

== Biography ==
He was born on 1 May 1934 to a poor, Chinese family in the area of the Somdet Chao Phraya Market, Thonburi, across the river from Bangkok. As a young boy, he studied at the Pitchaya Yatikaram Temple School, until the effects of World War II on his family's financial situation forced him to end his education.

After Chang left school, he developed an interest in artistic expression and used found pieces of charcoal and chalk to draw on the streets and the walls of his home. With funds received from his work as a menial labourer, he bought paper, paint and pencils and with these began drawing portraits of his family members and neighbours. He continued this practice until he was able to open a stall at a local market to undertake portraits professionally. After that, Chang began painting watercolour landscapes of the areas around his house. In 1960, one of these paintings, a landscape featuring the house of Pratuang Emjaoren, a well-known Thai artist and a close friend of Chang’s, became the first of his works to be included in an exhibition.

In the late 1950s, Chang began producing the first of his gestural abstraction paintings for which he is best known. According to the artist, these paintings were the result of a series of experimentations undertaken with the aim of developing a style that reflected Buddhist and Daoist principles, while also offering an alternative to the cubistic and impressionistic works that dominated Thai art circles of the period. These works were exhibited for the first time in 1966 at the Pratumwan art gallery, but were not received favourably by Thai audiences.

In 1968, when the artist was 34 years old, he self-published a book featuring his ‘concrete poems,’ which dealt with social themes as well as more personal meditations on nature and family life. Unlike his paintings, these works garnered interest from Thai literary circles, gaining popularity within counterculture movements that were gaining traction in the late 1960s and early 1970s.

Throughout his career, Chang positioned himself outside of mainstream art circles dominated by Silpakorn University and its National Exhibition of Art. Instead, he preferred to hold exhibitions of his and his student's works at his own home. Similarly, Chang generally refused to sell his works, preferring instead to gain income through other means. Chang died in August 1990 at the age of 56, and was survived by his wife, four sons and three daughters.

Since 2013, Chang's fascination with the international art scene has grown. His works have been showcased in numerous countries including China, Singapore, the USA, and Germany. Additionally, he held a solo exhibition at the Centre Pompidou in Paris in 2023.

== Arts Exhibition & Poetry ==
=== 1960 ===
- “The Thai-Chinese Art Exhibition of Thailand”, Bangkok.

=== 1966 ===
- “Contemporary Artists” Invitational Show", the 1st contemporary art exhibition initiated, organized and participated by leading contemporary artists, at Pathumwan Art Gallery, Bangkok.

=== 1967 ===
- “Thai Contemporary Art Exhibition”, Singapore.
- “Thai Contemporary Art Exhibition”, Malaysia.
- “Five Contemporary Artists”, the 3rd contemporary art exhibition, at Pathumwan Art Gallery, Bangkok.

=== 1968 ===
- “Tang Chang, his students and children” Art Exhibition, King Kaew Orphanage in Chiengmai province, a benefit show.
- “Tang Chang and Children”s Art Exhibition”, Gallery 20, Bangkok.

=== 1969 ===
- “Invited Artist”, invited by the School of Art and Crafts (Poh Chang) to participate in its special exhibition of contemporary art, Bangkok.
- “Tang Chang and Children”s Art Exhibition”, the 1st of its series ever staged at Tang Chang"s home in Bangkok.

=== 1970 ===
- “Tang Chang’s Paintings and Poetries Exhibition”, the 2nd of its series held at Tang Chang"s home, Bangkok.
- “Tang Chang: His Art and Poetry”, a collection of his selected drawings, paintings and poetry (covering a full decade of accomplishments from 1960-1970), the 3rd of its series exhibited at Tang Chang"s home, Bangkok.
- “An Introduction to Tang Chang: Poet, Artist and Philosopher”, a special exhibition on his contemporary drawings and paintings, poetry, and philosophical writings, at the Embassy of the United States of America, Wireless Road, Bangkok.

=== 1971 ===
- Art Exhibition “Tang Chang, his students and children’s poetry”, the 4th in the series held at his home in Bangkok.

=== 1972 ===
- “Tang Chang, His Students and Children”s Art Exhibition”, at the foyer of the Warners Theatre, Bangkok.
- “Contemporary Poetry”, a public recital as invited poet at Kasetsart University, Bangkok.

=== 1973 ===
- “Tang Chang, His Students and Children”s Art Exhibition”, an open air contemporary art exhibition staged along the footpath around the huge Phramane Ground (Sanam Luang), next to the Royal Grand Palace and the Temple of the Emerald Buddha, Bangkok.

=== 1974 ===
- “Tang Chang and His Children”s Art Exhibition”, at Suan Kularb College, Bangkok.
- “Tang Chang: His Art and Writings”, a special exhibit staged at the main auditorium of Thammasat University.
- “Tang Chang and His Children”s Art Exhibition”, an Invitational show organized and sponsored by the Goethe Institute-Bangkok.

=== 1980 ===
- “Mother”, a public display of his writings, and poetry recital of his concrete poetry, sponsored by the Buddhism Studies Club, Thammasat University.
- “Thai-Chinese-English Poetry Society of Thailand”, a special forum of cultural exchange through poetry written in 3 different languages, “Invited Poet” participating in public poetry recital, the National Library, Bangkok.
- “Tang Chang: His Concrete Poetry”, an invitational show of his concrete poetry, reciting his works to the audience, at Silapakorn University.

=== 1981 ===
- “The 27th National Art Exhibition”, participated as an Invited Artist, Bangkok.

=== 1985 ===
- Poetry Recital, at the A.U.A. Auditorium, Bangkok. Establishment of Poet Tang Chang Institute of Modern Art, Bangkok.
- “Tang Chang”s Retrospective Show (1957-1985)”, at Poet Tang Chang Institute of Modern Art.

=== 1991 ===
- “The Power of Truth” By Tang Chang : Pratuang Emcharoen, at River City Shopping Complex, Bangkok

=== 1994 ===
- “Palette of Tang Chang’s Inner Mind”, Solo Exhibition at Sukhumvit 20, Bangkok.

=== 1995 ===
- “Asian Modernism” 28th Oct – 3rd Dec. at Japan Foundation Forum, Tokyo, organized by The Japan Foundation Asia Center.

=== 1996 ===
- “Asian Modernism” 6th Feb – 6 March. Metropolitan Museum of Manila, Philippines, organized by Metropolitan Museum of Manila, Embassy of Japan, The Philippines, The Japan Foundation.
- “Asian Modernism” 8–28 May, at The National Gallery, Bangkok, Thailand, organized by The Fine Arts Department, Ministry of Education, Thailand and The Japan Foundation.
- “Asian Modernism” 1 June – 31 July, Gedung Pameran Seni Rupa, Department Pendidkan dan Kebudayaan, Jakata, Indonesia, organized by Directorate General for Culture, Ministry of Education and Culture, Republic of Indonesia and The Japan Foundation.

=== 2000 ===
- “TANG CHANG THE ORIGINAL, THE ORIGINAL TANG CHANG!”

Artist's Collection of 400 Selected Self-Portraits (1954 – 1987)
 21 March – 9 April 2000 at The Mercury Art Gallery, Plernchit, Bangkok.

=== 2001 ===
- “The Artist is chasing, chasing, chasing,

Chasing, chasing, chasing, chasing after, Chasing, chasing, chasing, keep on chasing, Chasing, chasing, chasing, and chasing, To seize the sun light for his painting.” 25 June – 22 July 2001 at Open Arts Space, The Silom Galleria.

=== 2002 ===
- TANG CHANG “A MOMENT IN A LONG, PRODUCTIVE AND CREATIVE LIFE!”

An overview of his lifetime Works is composed of 3 dimensions of his creative endeavours, reflecting his critical views of world.

  - The Artist's Collection of Paintings (1954 -1990)
  - The Artist's Collection of Literary Works (1960–1990)
  - The Artist's Collection of Living Words of Wisdom (1967 -1990)

17 – 30 September 2002 at Marsi Gallery, Suan Pakkad Palace Museum, Bangkok. 1 – 14 October 2002 at 14 October 73 Memorial, Ratchadamnoen Avenue, Bangkok 11 – 26 October 2002 at Pridi Banomyong Institute, Sukhumvit 55, Bangkok. TRAVELLING EXHIBITS All the above 3 sets of exhibited Works (67 pieces) will be exhibited as the followings:

  - 1st – 15 November 2002 at Art and Culture Gallery, Naresuan University, Phitsanulok.
  - 20 November – 3 December 2002 at Khon Kaen University, Khon Kaen.
  - 9th -23 December 2002 at Ubon Vocational College, Ubon Ratchathani

=== 2007 ===
- World View from Within : Tang Chang, Tang Chang's Private Collection 1958 – 1982, Chamchuri Art Gallery, Chulalongkorn University, Bangkok

=== 2008 ===
- Local Museum Festival, 2nd – 4 November at Princess Maha Chaki Sirindhorn Anthropology Centre (Public Organisation), Bangkok

=== 2013 ===
- Tang Chang : “It was my desire to have my very own space” Tang Chang's special collection, Drawings, Concrete Poetry and Poems, 5 February – 31 March at Subhashok The Arts Centre (S.A.C.), Sukhumvit 33, Bangkok.
- “Tang Chang: Abstract Paintings – Concrete Poetry”, Tang Chang's special collection, Paintings and Concrete Poetry, 15 February – 28 April at G23 Srinakharinwirot University, Sukhumvit 23, Bangkok.

=== 2014 ===
- Invited to participate in International Contemporary Art Festival “Shanghai Biennale X” on 23 November 2014 – 31 March 2015 at Power Station of Art, Shanghai, People's Republic of China (PRC).

=== 2015 ===
- The World is Our Home. A Poem on Abstraction, Para Site, Hong Kong.

=== 2016 ===
- Reframing Modernism: Painting from Southeast Asia, Europe and Beyond, National Gallery Singapore, Singapore.

=== 2017 ===
- “Misfits”: Pages from a Loose-Leaf Modernity, Haus der Kulturen der Welt, Berlin.

=== 2018 ===
- Tang Chang: The Painting That is Painted with Poetry is Profoundly Beautiful, Smart Museum of Art, University of Chicago, Chicago.
- Awakenings: Art in Society in Asia 1960s–1990s, The National Museum of Modern Art, Tokyo.

=== 2019 ===
- Awakenings: Art in Society in Asia, 1960s–1990s, National Gallery Singapore, Singapore; National Museum of Modern and Contemporary Art, Seoul

=== 2023 ===
- Tang Chang: Non-Forms, Centre Pompidou, Paris, France

== Social Contribution ==
=== 1960 ===
- Portraiture, publicly executed portraits (charcoal), benefit given to the Red Cross Society of Thailand, Bangkok.

=== 1961 ===
- Portraiture, publicly executed portraits (charcoal), a charity act at the fund-raising activity of the Red Cross Society of Thailand.
- Pioneered the “White on White” technique, for abstract paintings.

=== 1962 ===
- “Fingers Painting”, Tang Chang"s own technique employed for the execution of a series of 12 large scaled oil paintings on “ The Bhodhisatava”, currently a permanent collection of the Tian Hua Hospital Foundation, Samyak Area of China Town, Bangkok.
- Portraiture, benefit work (charcoal) donated to assist a fund-raising drive launched by the Red Cross Society of Bangkok.
- Pioneered the “Black on Black” technique, as a form of abstract expression.

=== 1971 ===
- Tang Chang – Representing Thailand, by virtue of his literary accomplishment, invited to participate in the Congress of Orientalists, 1971, Canberra, Australia.
- Invited guest lecturer, a development course attended by Buddhist Monks and Students Development Unit, Jittaphawan Buddhist College, Bang-Lamung district, Cholburi province.
- The Association of Thai Students in Canberra requested permission to publish Tang Chang"s Avand Guard literary works in their publication, and for wider dissemination in Australia. Permission granted.
- “Look East” magazine published Tang Chang"s concrete poetry, and his paintings, making his works better known around the world.

== Literary works ==
- 2020
  - Thassana Sinlapa – Thassana Kawi | Thinking on Arts, Thinking on Poetry. Nakhonpathom: Tang Chang's Descendants Publishing.
- 2013
  - Chang Sae-tang: Chittakam Nammatham – Bot Kawi Ruppatham | Tang Chang: Abstract Paintings – Concrete Poetry. Nakhonpathom: Tang Chang's Descendants Publishing.
  - Pro Chan Tongkan Thiwang Khong Chan | Tang Chang: It was My Desire to Have My Very Own Space. Nakhonpathom: Tang Chang's Descendants Publishing.
- 2010
  - Bot Kawi Khong Chan: Chang Sae-tang: Arom Khwamkhit Khwampenma Khong Bot Kawi 1967–1984 [My Poetry: Chang Sae Tang: Emotions, Thoughts, Origins of Poems, 1967–1984]. Nakhonpathom: Tang Chang's Descendants Publishing.
  - Tamra Pichai Songkhram Khong Than Sun Wu [Textbook of War by Sun Zi]. Nakhonpathom: Tang Chang's Descendants Publishing.
  - Lokkathat Chak Phai Nai: Phon Ngan Chittakam 2501-2525 BE | World View from Within: Tang Chang's Private Collection 1958–1982. Nakhonpathom: The Tang Chang Private Museum.
- 2002
  - Wela An Yao Nan: Chang Sae-tang: Phak Akson Mi Lom Haichai 1967–1990 [Tang Chang: A Moment in a Long, Productive and Creative Life: Selected Works from the Artist's Collection of Living Words of Wisdom (1967–1990)], vols. 1–3. Nakhonpathom: Tang Chang's Descendants Publishing.
- 2000
  - Chang Sae-tang Ko Kue Chang Sae-tang: Phab Baina Tua Eng 400 Chin 2497-2530 BE | Tang Chang the Original, the Original Tang Chang: Artist's Collection of 400 Selected Self-Portraits (1954–1987). Nakhonpathom: The Tang Chang Private Museum.
- 1987
  - Poramat Dao [Comparing Buddhism and Daoism]. Bangkok: Wan Mai.
  - Dek Khon Nan 2 [That Child 2]. Bangkok: Wan Mai.
- 1986
  - “Dan wannasin” [On language arts], in Raingan Kan Sammana Ruang Khwam Samphan Rawang Kan Suksa Lae Kan Wichai - Thang Sinlapa Kap Sangkhom Thai [Report of the Seminar on the Relationship Between Education and Research on Thai Art and Society]. Bangkok: National Research Council.
  - Wan Mai [The New Day]. Bangkok: Wan Mai.
  - Woeng Fah [Sky]. Bangkok: Wan Mai.
- 1985
  - Yam Chao [The Morning]. Bangkok: Wan Mai.
- 1975
  - Ah Q: Bot Praphan Ek Khong Lu Xun [Ah Q: A Masterpiece by Lu Xun]. Bangkok: Chang Sae-tang.
- 1974
  - Bot Kawi Chin [Chinese Poetry]. Bangkok: Chang Sae-tang.
  - Pab Pot Ti Phan Ma [Images from the Past]. Bangkok: Chang Sae-tang.
- 1973
  - Kampi Dao De Jing [Daodejing by Laozi]. Bangkok: Chang Sae-tang.
- 1972
  - Mae Kab Luk [Mother and Child]. Bangkok: Chang Sae-tang.
- 1969
  - Dek Khon Nan [That Child]. Bangkok: Chang Sae-tang.
  - Apiprachya Silapa Khon Tan Tao Shi [The Metaphysics of Art According to Shitao]. Bangkok: Chang Sae-tang.
- 1968
  - Pok Dam [Black Cover]. Bangkok: Chang Sae-tang.

== International Exhibition ==
- Shanghai Biennale, China (2014)
- The World is our Home, Hong Kong (2015)
- Reframing Modernism, Singapore (2016)
- Misfits : Pages from loose-leaf modernity, Germany (2017)
- Tang Chang : The Painting That is Painted With Poetry is Beautiful, Chicago, USA (2018)
- Awakenings: Art in Society in Asia 1960s–1990s, The National Museum of Modern Art, Tokyo. (2018)
- Awakenings: Art in Society in Asia, 1960s–1990s, National Gallery Singapore, Singapore; National Museum of Modern and Contemporary Art, Seoul (2019)
- Tang Chang: Non-Forms, Centre Pompidou, Paris, France (2023)

== Works in Public Collections ==
- The Art Institute of Chicago, Chicago
- Centre Pompidou, Paris, Musée national d’art moderne - Centre de création industrielle
- National Gallery Singapore, Singapore

== Other resources ==
=== Writings about Tang Chang ===
- d’Abbs, Peter. “Tang Chang: An Artist and His World,” LOOKEAST 1, no. 11 (October 1971), 14-21.
- Art in the Reign of King Rama IX: 6 Decades of Thai Art. Bangkok: Rama IX Art Museum Foundation, 2006.
- Archer, Pamela, and Giovanni Cutolo. Tang Chang. Milan: Istituto De Angeli, 1968.
- Bae, Myungji, Yu Jin Seng and Katsuo Suzuki, eds. Awakenings: Art in Society in Asia, 1960s–1990s. Tokyo: National Museum of Modern Art, Tokyo; Seoul: National Museum of Modern and Contemporary Art, Korea; Singapore: National Gallery Singapore, 2019.
- Cacchione, Orianna. Tang Chang: The Painting that is Painted with Poetry is Profoundly Beautiful. Chicago: Smart Museum of Art, the University of Chicago, 2018.
- Cheng, Jia Yun. “Tang Chang.” In Reframing Modernism: Painting from Southeast Asia, Europe and Beyond, edited by Sarah Lee and Sara Siew, 214–219. Singapore: National Gallery Singapore, 2016.
- Clark, John. “‘Tradition’ in Thai Modern Art.” Southeast of Now: Directions in Contemporary and Modern Art in Asia 4, no. 2 (2020): 39-89.
- Costinas, Cosmin, and Inti Guerrero. The World is Our Home: A Poem on Abstraction: Robert Motherwell, Bruce Nauman, Tomie Ohtake, Tang Chang. Hong Kong: Para Site Art Space, 2011.
- Franke, Anselm. 10th Shanghai Biennale: Social Factory. Shanghai: Power Station of Art, 2014.
- Kumjim, Prapon. “Magpie Modernity in Thai Art.” In Art Studies 01: Cultural Rebellion in Asia 1960–1989, edited by Furuichi Yasuko, 54–59. Tokyo: Japan Foundation Asia Center, 2015.
- Kunavichayanont, Luckana, and Apisak Sonjod. Krungthep 226: The Art from Early Days, Bangkok to the Imagined Future. Bangkok: Bangkok Art and Culture Centre, 2008.
- Mashadi, Ahmad. “Brief Notes on Traditionalism in Modern Thai Art.” In Modernity and Beyond: Themes in Southeast Asian Art, edited by T.K. Sabapathy, 61–68. Singapore: Singapore Art Museum, 1996.
- Mukdamanee, Vichoke, and Sutee Kunavichayanont. Rattanakosin Art: The Reign of King Rama IX. Bangkok: Amarin Printing and Publishing Public Company, 1997.
- Poshyananda, Apinan. Modern Art in Thailand: Nineteenth and Twentieth Centuries. New York: Oxford University Press, 1992.
- Rodboon, Somporn. “History of Modern Art in Thailand.” In Asian Modernism: Diverse Development in Indonesia, the Philippines, and Thailand, edited by Furuichi Yasuko and Nakamoto Kazumi, 243–251. Tokyo: The Japan Foundation Asia Center, 1995.
- Praepipatmongkol, Chanon Kenji. “Postwar Abstraction and Practices of Knowledge: Fernando Zóbel and Chang Saetang.” PhD thesis, University of Michigan, 2020.
- Shioda, Junichi. “Bangkok and Chiang Mai: Ways of Modernity.” In Asian Modernism: Diverse Development in Indonesia, the Philippines, and Thailand, edited by Furuichi Yasuko and Nakamoto Kazumi, 238–242. Tokyo: The Japan Foundation Asia Center, 1995.
- Suwannakudt, Phaptawan. “Tang Chang in My Memories.” Unpublished manuscript, 2016, typescript.
- Tang, Chang. “Questions, Humans, Art.” In The Modern in Southeast Asian Art: A Reader, edited by T.K. Sabapathy and Patrick Flores, 841–842. Singapore: National Gallery Singapore, 2023.
- - Chang Sae-tang: Chittakam Nammatham – Bot Kawi Ruppatham | Tang Chang: Abstract Paintings – Concrete Poetry. Nakhonpathom: The Tang Chang Private Museum, 2013.
- - Pro Chan Tongkan Thiwang Khong Chan | Tang Chang: It was My Desire to Have My Very Own Space. Nakhonpathom: The Tang Chang Private Museum, 2013.
- - The Artist is Chasing, Chasing, Chasing, Chasing, Chasing, Chasing After, Chasing, Chasing, Chasing, Keep on Chasing, Chasing, Chasing, Chasing, and Chasing, to Seize the Sun Light for His Painting: Painting by Tang Chang. Bangkok: Open Arts Space, 2001.
- Taylor, Nora A. “Tang Chang: The Painting that is Painted with Poetry is Profoundly Beautiful.” ArtAsiaPacific, no. 109 (2018): 113.
- Teh, David. “The Preter-Natural: The Southeast Asian Contemporary and What Haunts It.” ARTMargins 6, no. 1 (2017): 33–63.
- Teh, David et al. “Misfits”: Pages from a Loose-Leaf Modernity. Berlin: Haus der Kulturen der Welt, 2017.
- - “Misfits”: lose blätter aus der geschichte der moderne: Rox Lee, Tang Chang und Bagyi Aung Soe. Berlin: Haus der Kulturen der Welt, 2017.
- Tsui, Enid H. Y. “Tang Chang: A Reluctant ‘Outsider’ of Thai Modern Art.” World Art 12, no.1 (2022): 1–23.
- - “Beyond the Mirror: Tang Chang’s Self-Portraits as Anti-Canonical Resistance.” MA thesis, University of Hong Kong, 2020.
- Veal, Clare. “Chang sae Tang: The Material Conditions of the Archive.” Art Monthly Australasia 297 (2017): 22–27.

=== Writings about Tang Chang in Thai Language ===
- Anuson Nai Kan Chapanakit Sop Khun Po Chang Sae-tang [Funeral Book of Tang Chang]. Bangkok: Thip Sae-tang, 1990.
- Charoenchai, Boonrat. “Silapin Kawi Chang Sae-tang Bot Rian Chiwit Khong Pu Mi Kwam Tangchai” [Tang Chang: Life Lessons for the Willful]. Silapa Wattanatham 15, no. 4 (1994): 47–50.
- Jitjamnong, Duangmon. “Wikro Phalang Thang Panya Nai Ngan Kawi Niphon Khong Chang Sae-tang” [An Analysis of Intellectual Power in the Poetry of Chang Sae-tang]. In Kawi Niphon Thai Ruam Samai: Bot Wikro Lae San Niphon [Contemporary Thai Poems: Analysis and Anthology], edited by Akkapak Laochintanasri, 457–499. Bangkok: Siam Publishing, 2000.
- Jitjamnong, Duangmon, and Korbkarn Pinyomark. “Lokkathat Kiaw Kab Thammachat Nai Kawi Niphon Ruamsamai: Korani Suksa Angkarn Kallayanapong Lae Chang Sae-tang” [A World View of Nature in Contemporary Poetry: Case Studies of Angkarn Kallayanapong and Tang Chang]. Humanities and Social Sciences Journal 1, no. 1 (2005): 1–25.
- Khemthong, Sapisara. “Ittipon Watthanatham Chin Nai Ngan Chittakam Khong Chang Sae-tang” [The Influence of Chinese Culture in Tang Chang's Painting]. MA thesis, Silpakorn University, 2013.
- Sae-tang, Nawapooh, ed. Chang Suksa [Chang Studies]. Nakhonpathom: Tang Chang's Descendants Publishing, 2020.
- - “Chang Sae-tang: Tua Ton Kab Kan Sang Phol Ngan Sinlapa” [Tang Chang: The Study of Self and Work]. Institute of Culture and Arts Journal 21, no. 2, (2020): 10–19.
- - ”Kan Chad Wang Chang Sae-tang Nai Phawa Mai Long Loy Khong Khanob Sinlapa Thai Samai Mai” [Locating the Misfits of Tang Chang Within the Tradition of Modern Art in Thailand]. MA thesis, Mahidol University, 2019.
- - “Chang Sae-tang: Yang Mi Arai Hai Suksa? | Tang Chang: Are There Something to Studies?” Fine Arts Journal 10, no. 2, (2019): 137–158.
- - “Chang Sae-tang Kab Lok Sinlapa Kon Lae Lang 14 Tula 16” [Tang Chang and Art Field Before / After 14 October 1973]. Journal of Social Sciences Naresuan University 15, no. 2, (2019): 112–136
- Suksawang, Sinchai. “Wikro Wannakam Khong Chang Sae-tang” [Analysis of Tang Chang's Literature]. MA thesis, Srinakharinwirot University, 1977.
- Tangpornprasert, Atchara. “Kan Suksa Wikro Phonngan Chittakam Khong Chang Sae-tang Po So 2497–2532” [An Analysis of Tang Chang's Paintings Since 1954–1989]. MA thesis, Srinakharinwirot University, 2003.
- Taweekarn, Nipon. “Chang Sae-tang Sinlapin Pu Ahangkan Bon Senthang Khong Ton Eng” [Tang Chang: A Lofty Artist on His Own Path]. Sarakadee 9, no. 108, (1994): 165–170.
- Yensabai, Amnard. “Thana Thang Prawattisat Khong Chang Sae-tang” [Historical Status of Tang Chang]. Art Record in Thailand 1, no. 2, (1994): 36–37.
