= Caroline Kellett =

British journalist

- Caroline Kellett, pictured in The Observer, December 1989
- Born: 1960; Buckinghamshire
- Died: 26 August 2014 (aged 53–54)
- Education: Wadham College, Oxford
- Occupation: journalist
- Spouse: Jean-Marc Fraysse (2002-2014)

Caroline Kellett (1960 - 26 August 2014), usually known just as Kellett, was a British journalist who was fashion editor of Tatler and held a number of other positions in British fashion journalism.

Kellett was born in Buckinghamshire and attended Wadham College, Oxford, graduating with a BA degree in History in 1981. Known for her distinctive personal style, she once arrived at an Oxford party in a punk outfit of tartan minidress with a cannon ball chained to her ankle. She spent two years in India studying yoga.

After graduating, Kellet worked for Vogue as fashion features editor for five years. She commented on the latest trends, describing the Dreadshock look adopted by Posers as "the most inspired expression of teenage individualism yet". She was supportive of Karl Lagerfeld's updating of the Chanel look in the early 1980s, saying "All the stuff pre-Karl was so-o-o square."

She was fashion editor for the London Evening Standard in 1988 and later of Tatler. In 1989, she represented Tatler in an article in The Observer looking at the personal style of four fashion professionals. In 1997 she was the society editor of OK! magazine and she also worked for British W magazine. She was an active freelance writer.

Kellet married the French banker Jean-Marc Fraysse in 2002.
