= New South Wales 1100 class railcar =

1100 class railcar
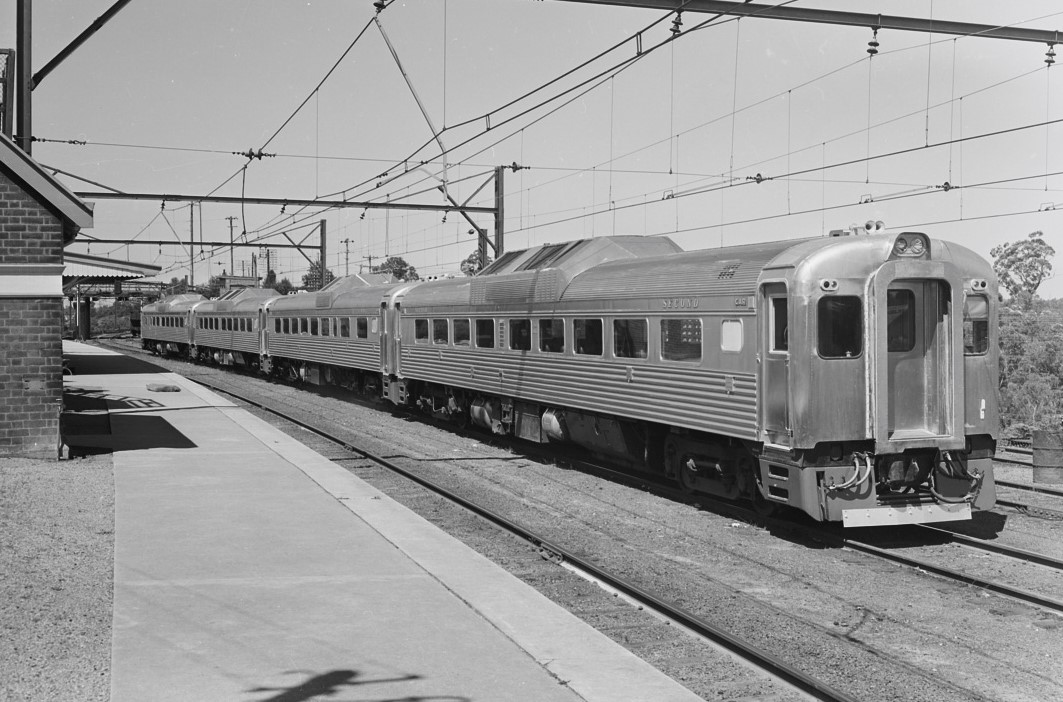
- A 4 car set on a trial run in 1961

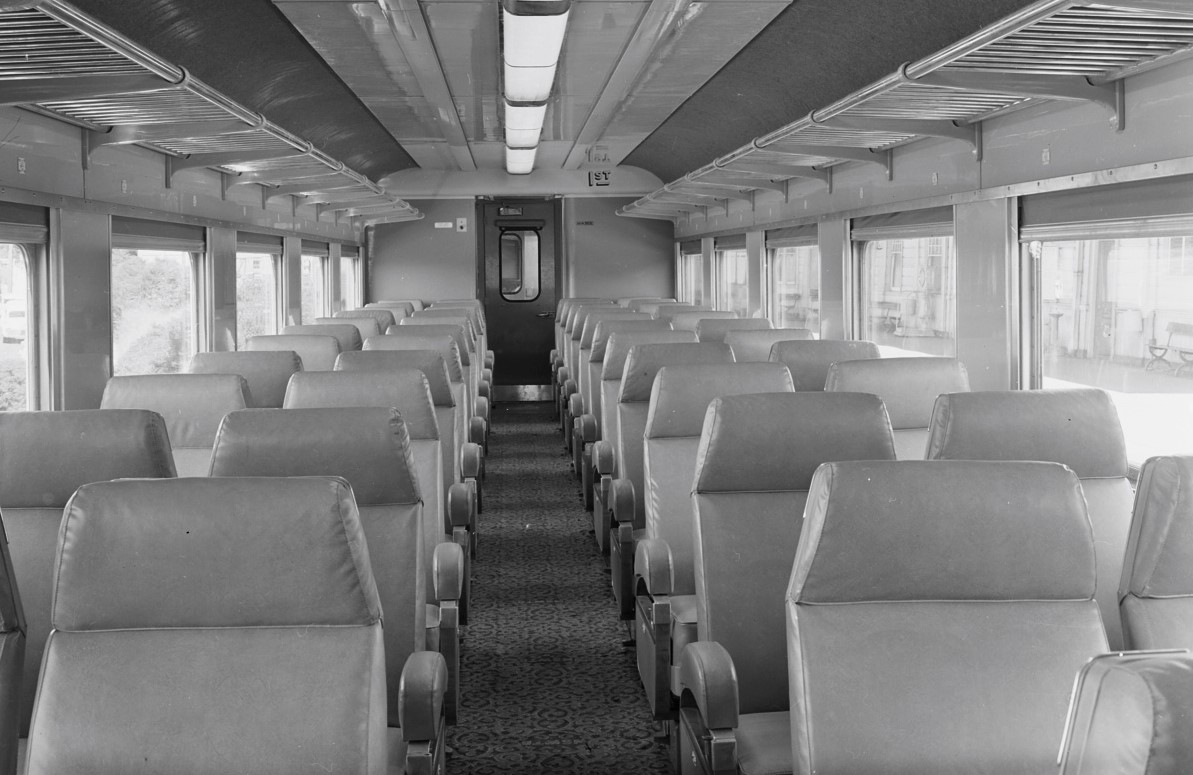
- Interior of a first class Budd railcar
- Stock type: Diesel Railcar
- Manufacturer: Commonwealth Engineering
- Built at: Granville
- Constructed: 1961
- Entered service: 1961-1993
- Scrapped: 1994
- Number built: 5 carriages (4 power cars, 1 trailer car)
- Number scrapped: All carriages
- Fleet numbers: FPB 1101-1102; PHB 1141-1142; BRB 1181
- Depot: ACDEP
- Line served: South Coast

Specifications
- Car length: 23.46 m (77 ft 0 in)
- Width: 2.77 m (9 ft 1 in)
- Height: 4.23 m (13 ft 11 in) (over dome)
- Traction system: Diesel
- Prime mover: 2 x Detroit Diesel 6/110 62806RD
- Power output: 600 hp (447 kW) (2 x 300 hp (224 kW)
- Auxiliaries: Leyland O.350/O.400 (BRB 1181 only)
- Track gauge: 1,435 mm (4 ft 8 1/2 in) standard gauge

The 1100 class railcar or Budd railcar were a type of diesel railcar built by Commonwealth Engineering for the Department of Railways New South Wales in 1961. They primarily operated on the South Coast Daylight Express until withdrawn in 1993.

== History ==
During the 1950s, the Department of Railways New South Wales ordered rolling stock for the Brisbane Limited, including some stainless steel double deck sleeping carriages. Due to financial constraints only ten conventional sleeping carriages were built. To use the excess materials that had been stockpiled, Commonwealth Engineering constructed five cars, four self-propelled Budd Rail Diesel Cars, and a matching non-powered trailer car. While following Budd RDC layouts, these cars were smaller than standard, being only 77 feet in length and narrower in width to fit the NSW loading gauge.

== Construction ==
Commonwealth Engineering built four power cars and a fifth unit as a trailer car. The four power cars (FPB 1101/1102 and PHB 1141/1142) were each powered by the standard Budd Rail Diesel Car equipment of two 300 hp 6-cylinder Detroit Diesel 6/110 engines coupled to Allison RC3 transmissions. BRB 1181 was the only Budd Rail Diesel Car in the world built as an unpowered trailer. This vehicle was fitted with a 6-cylinder Leyland O.350 diesel to power the air-conditioning, buffet and lighting. This was later replaced with a Leyland O.400 diesel engine. BRB 1181 was easily distinguished from the other cars by having a smaller roof dome.

The FPB class were all passenger vehicles, seating 72 economy class in two compartments. The PHB class featured a 2-ton capacity luggage compartment at one end and seating for 60 economy class passengers in two compartments. The trailer car had a buffet providing light refreshments located at one end and seating for 50 first class passengers.

== Service history ==
The first two cars entered service in 1961 on the Goulburn Day Train with a U set trailer, before all entered service in March 1961 on the train they were built for, the South Coast Daylight Express. The set generally operated with four carriages.

In October 1969, FPB 1101 and FPB 1102 operated test runs to Albury and Narrandera as part of the introduction of the 1200 railcars to the Riverina Express. Following problems with these carriages, the 1100 class operated the Riverina Express a number of times in 1972.

By the late 1970s, they were becoming unreliable due to ageing mechanical equipment. From September 1982, they began to be locomotive hauled to improve service reliability. Following a derailment at Erskinville in February 1983 they were withdrawn pending conversion to locomotive hauled stock. However FPB 1102 and PHB 1141 were reinstated to operational status and sent to operate services connecting with the Riverina XPT between Junee and Griffith. The remaining three were pooled with the 1200 Class railcars and worked as locomotive hauled cars to operate South Coast services from November 1983.

In February 1986, the Griffith service was converted to road transport and the two 1100 class railcars were scheduled for conversion to locomotive hauled stock on the South Coast. However, PHB 1141 was sent to the Commonwealth Engineering plant at Granville for the fitting of Cummins engines and Voith transmission, but was destroyed by fire during the conversion. Following the cessation of the South Coast Daylight Express in January 1991 they were redeployed to operate services on the Main South line to Moss Vale and Goulburn.

Following their replacement by Endeavour railcars in 1993, all five members were scrapped in January 1994.
