= Zephyrette (train) =

American passenger train service

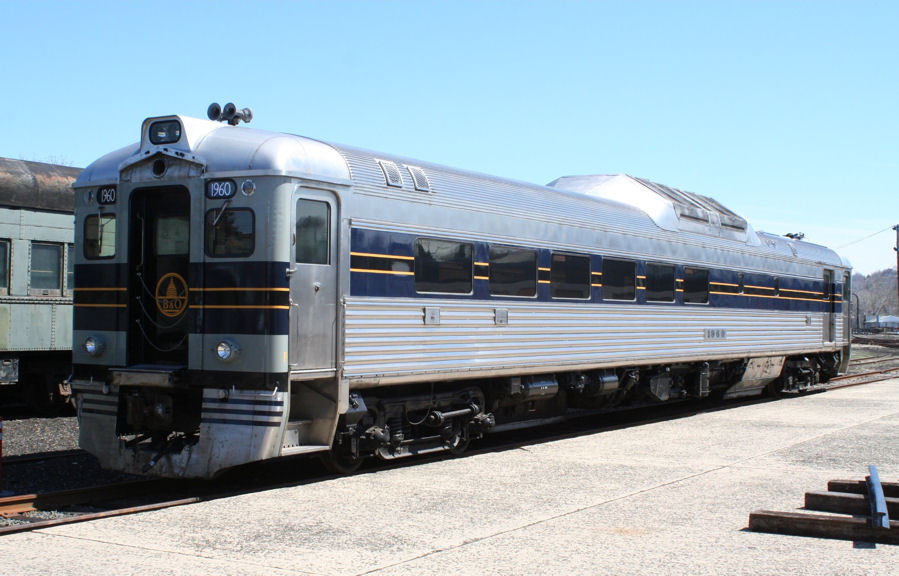
- A Baltimore and Ohio Budd RDC-2, the same model of Rail Diesel Car used by the Western Pacific for its Zephyrette service

Overview
- Service type: Inter-city rail
- Status: Discontinued
- Locale: Western United States
- Predecessor: Royal Gorge
- First service: September 15, 1950
- Last service: October 2, 1960
- Former operator: Western Pacific Railroad

Route
- Termini: Oakland, California; Salt Lake City
- Stops: 19 (scheduled)
- Distance travelled: 924 miles (1,487 km)
- Average journey time: 22 hours and 48 minutes (eastbound); 23 hours and 30 minutes (westbound)
- Service frequency: Tri-weekly
- Train number: 1, 2

Technical
- Rolling stock: Budd Rail Diesel Car
- Track gauge: 4 ft 8 1/2 in (1,435 mm)
- Operating speed: 70 mph (110 km/h)

The Zephyrette was a tri-weekly train consisting of a Budd Rail Diesel Car (RDC) run by the Western Pacific Railroad between Oakland, California, and Salt Lake City from 1950 to 1960. Covering 924 miles (1,487 km), it was the longest RDC service in the United States. The successor to the Western Pacific's Royal Gorge as a secondary supplement to the California Zephyr, the Zephyrette began service on September 15, 1950. Both the existence and western terminus of the route were shaped by the stipulations of regulatory agencies, while the two RDCs the railroad purchased for the train were substantially modified before entering revenue service.

The Zephyrette RDCs achieved considerable cost savings over their conventional predecessor and steam locomotives running similar routes, as well as operational advantages related to their quick acceleration and high cruising speeds. However, they were only temporarily able to keep the service profitable, and the train was ultimately discontinued by the Western Pacific on October 2, 1960, just over a decade after its debut.

== Background ==
The Zephyrette replaced the Royal Gorge in Western Pacific's timetable, which was itself a replacement for the Feather River Express. The Royal Gorge had been established as a passenger train secondary to the California Zephyr, and was intended to help facilitate movement of Western Pacific employees as well as mail, food, and other supplies in addition to carrying paying passengers. However, the Royal Gorge struggled financially; as its average daily ridership dropped from approximately 60 to 40 people, it was losing about $2,700 per day, and was on pace to lose $950,000 over the course of a year.

In November 1949, after eight months in operation, the Western Pacific decided to discontinue the Royal Gorge. It then notified the Interstate Commerce Commission (ICC) of its decision before exploring the possibility of transporting its employees by truck or bus instead of by train, which would have cost an estimated $165,000 per year. The discontinuance faced opposition from residents and businesses along the line who appealed to the California Public Utilities Commission and the Governor's office. Ultimately, the ICC granted the Western Pacific's request to discontinue its daily Royal Gorge service with the condition that it be replaced by a route between Oakland and Salt Lake City that operated three times a week.

== Planning and preparation ==
=== RDC evaluations and orders ===
In January 1950, the Western Pacific conducted a ten-day evaluation with a Budd RDC-1 demonstrator in revenue service between Portola, California, and Salt Lake City, a distance of 600 miles (970 km). This test made it one of the first railroads to use an RDC in revenue service. The runs were deemed a success, and they prompted the railroad to place the first order for an RDC from the Budd Company in May 1950, followed by a second purchase in July of that year. The two RDCs purchased were both of the 70-seat RDC-2 variety, and were numbered 375 and 376. The only difference between the RDC-2s that the Western Pacific ordered and the RDC-1 that it tested was that the former had a 17-foot (5.2 m) baggage compartment and 70 seats, while the latter had 90 seats but lacked the baggage section.

=== Original and modified plans ===
Originally, the Western Pacific had planned to run a single RDC on a tri-weekly schedule between Stockton, California, and Salt Lake City, a distance of 834 miles (1,342 km) across California, Nevada, and Utah. This essentially constituted the maximum distance for which a single car could provide both eastbound and westbound service three times per week. However, the California Public Utilities Commission stipulated that the new service must extend to Oakland, meaning that the total one-way distance to Salt Lake City would be 924 miles (1,487 km). This mandate effectively forced the Western Pacific to purchase a second RDC in order to operate the new route three times a week in both directions. It would also give the new Zephyrette service the distinction of being the longest RDC service in the United States. After the railroad took delivery of its second RDC in July 1950, the new cars were evaluated on a variety of test runs in preparation for entering revenue service.

=== RDC modifications ===
The Western Pacific's two RDCs also underwent a series of exterior and interior modifications before they entered revenue service. Exterior modifications included the addition of steel pilots (cowcatchers), oscillating "Gyralights" on the end doors, back-up horns, and roof-mounted illuminated numberboards. Interior upgrades included the installation of a standard Western Pacific road locomotive chair in each RDC cab, an expanded in-car communication system, a women's lavatory, a water cooler, reclining seats for long-distance passengers, eight photomurals depicting scenes along the route, nightlights, and numerous upgrades to the baggage compartment.

== Operation ==
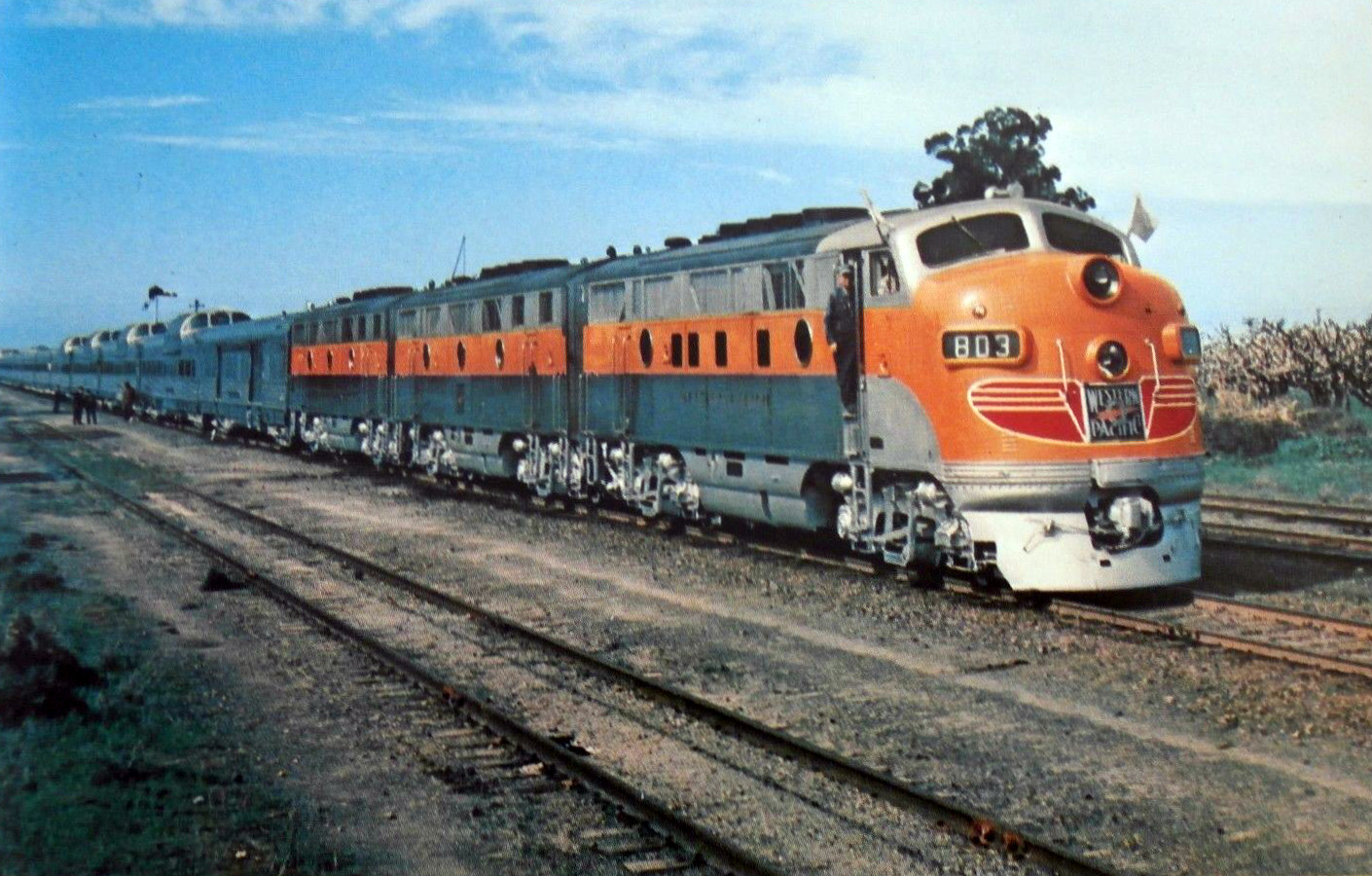
A Western Pacific EMD F3, shown here leading the California Zephyr. An F3 would also occasionally lead the Zephyrette during periods of peak demand.

The Western Pacific's Zephyrette consisted of a Budd RDC that was powered by twin inline six General Motors diesel engines, which each produced 275 horsepower (205 kW), and equipped with Allison torque converters. This setup allowed each RDC to cruise at 70 mph (110 km/h) in direct drive and 55 mph (89 km/h) in torque conversion mode during operation. The foam rubber seats in the RDCs were rated as "comfortable" at speeds up to 83 mph (134 km/h) and the application of disc brakes allowed fully loaded cars to stop from a speed of 85 mph (137 km/h) in 2,330 feet (710 m). In 6,000 miles (9,700 km) of testing and evaluation, the Western Pacific determined that its RDCs averaged 2.8 miles per US gallon (1.2 km/L), which at contemporary diesel prices yielded fuel costs of barely over 3 cents per mile; this compared favorably to the performance of steam locomotives on similar routes, which accrued costs of approximately 22 cents per mile.

The new Western Pacific RDC service was dubbed the "Zephyrette" due to both its supplemental relationship and (thanks to its stainless steel exteriors) visual resemblance to the California Zephyr. After replacing the Royal Gorge in the Western Pacific's timetable, the two Zephyrettes inherited its train numbers: 1 and 2. The inaugural eastbound Zephyrette left Oakland on September 15, 1950, while the first westbound train departed Salt Lake City two days later, on September 17, 1950. The service operated on a tri-weekly schedule, with eastbound trains departing Oakland at 7:57 pm every Sunday, Wednesday, and Friday, and their westbound counterparts leaving Salt Lake City at 7:30 am on the same days. Eastbound, the train's running time was 22 hours and 48 minutes, while westbound it was 23 hours and 30 minutes. In total, the Zephyrette route extended for 924 miles (1,487 km) and included 19 scheduled stops, as well as nearly 100 conditional stops.

The Zephyrettes lacked the luxurious appointments of the California Zephyr, foregoing foodservice entirely and providing only hot and cooled water for refreshments. Although the RDCs typically ran the route alone, during periods of peak demand the Western Pacific ran them in short trains behind an EMD F3, a water tender, and a baggage car. In October 1950, the railroad had computed the direct operating costs for the Zephyrette RDCs at 71 cents per train-mile, almost half the cost incurred by its conventional predecessor, the Royal Gorge. In addition to their relative economic efficiency, the cars also gained a reputation for reliability: one Western Pacific employee even likened one of the RDCs to "a big Buick". They also provided numerous advantages over conventional consists, especially in terms of their ability to accelerate quickly and maintain high sustained speeds, which allowed for faster service of the route's conditional stops than had previously been possible. While the Zephyrettes had initially been profitable for the Western Pacific, they did not remain so, with losses of $255,000 in 1959. Western Pacific ended use of the Southern Pacific Railroad's connecting cross-bay ferry between Oakland and San Francisco in early summer 1958, then discontinued the parallel bus connection later in the same summer. The train was scheduled to be discontinued on June 1, 1960, but opposition from residents along the line led to an order from the Interstate Commerce Commission to temporarily delay the train's end. The service was ultimately ended on October 2, 1960.
