= Budd Rail Diesel Car =

Diesel multiple unit

Budd Rail Diesel Car (RDC)
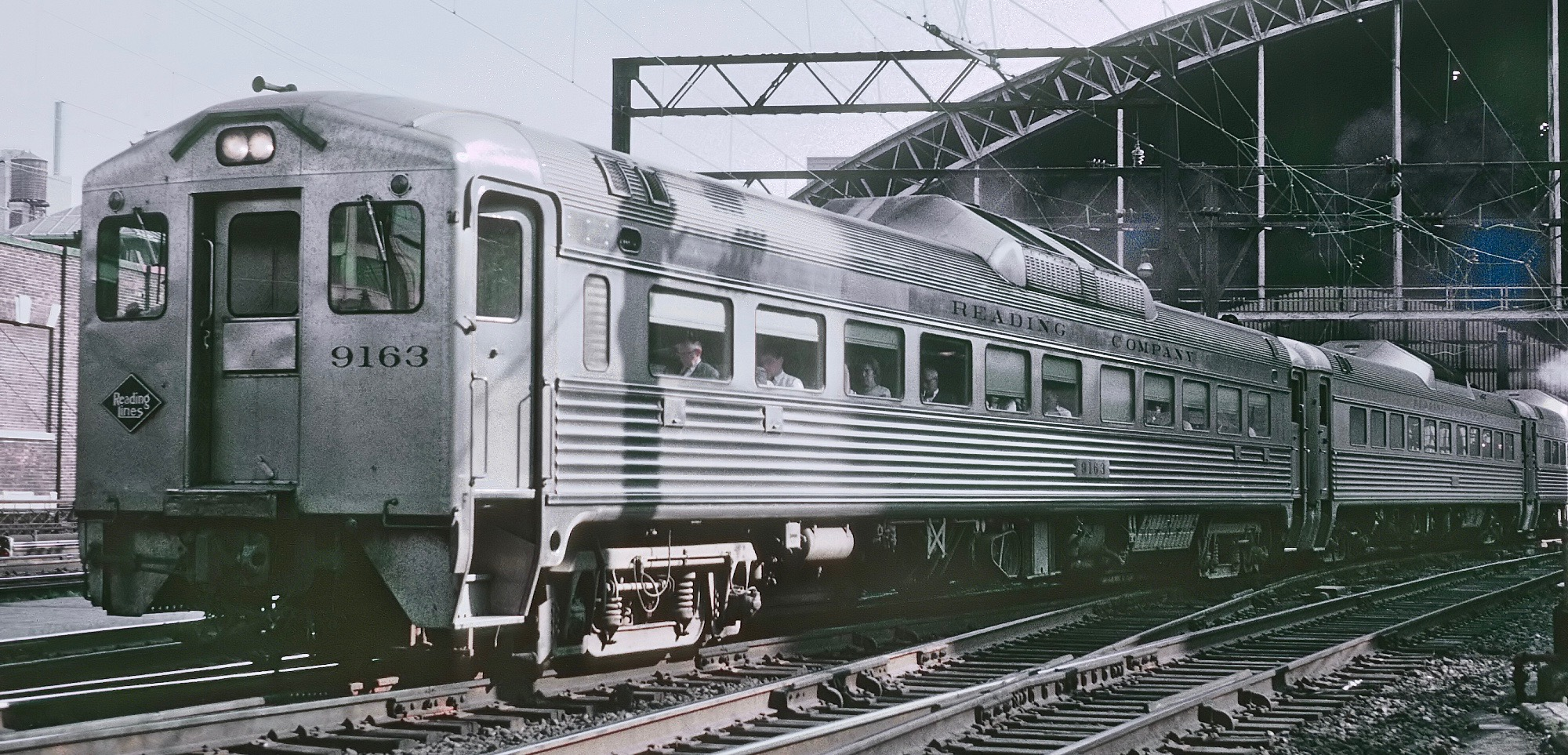
- A Reading Company Budd Rail Diesel Car consist leaving Reading Terminal, September 1964

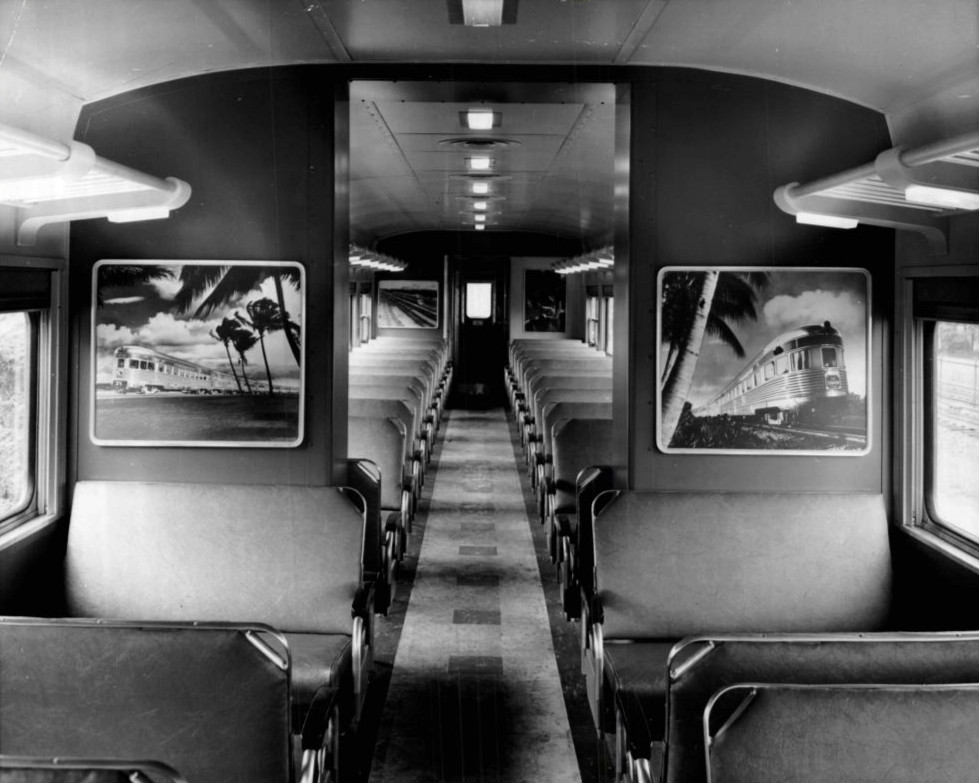
- Interior of the RDC-1 demonstrator in 1949
- In service: 1949–present
- Manufacturer: Budd Company
- Constructed: 1949–1962
- Number built: 398
- Capacity: RDC-1: 90 passengers; RDC-2: 70 passengers, baggage section; RDC-3: 48 passengers, RPO, baggage section; RDC-4: RPO, baggage section; RDC-9: 94 passengers

Specifications
- Car body construction: Stainless steel
- Car length: RDC-1/2/3/9: 85 ft (25.91 m); RDC-4: 73 ft 10 in (22.50 m)
- Width: 10 ft 0 3/8 in (3.06 m)
- Height: 14 ft 7 in (4.45 m)
- Maximum speed: 85 mph (137 km/h)
- Weight: 109,200–118,300 lb (49,500–53,700 kg)
- Prime movers: RDC-1/2/3/4: 2 × GM 110 diesels; RDC-9: 1 × GM 110 diesel
- Power output: RDC-1/2/3/4: 550 hp (410 kW); RDC-9: 300 hp (220 kW)
- Transmission: Hydraulic torque converter
- Electric system: N/A
- UIC classification: RDC-1/2/3/4: (1A)(A1); RDC-9: (1A)2′
- AAR wheel arrangement: RDC-1/2/3/4: 1A-A1; RDC-9: 1A-2
- Braking system: New York Air Brake air brakes
- Track gauge: 4 ft 8 1/2 in (1,435 mm) standard gauge

The Budd Rail Diesel Car (RDC), also known as the Budd car or Buddliner, is a self-propelled diesel multiple unit (DMU) railcar. Between 1949 and 1962, 398 RDCs were built by the Budd Company of Philadelphia, Pennsylvania, United States. The cars were primarily adopted for passenger service in rural areas with low traffic density or in short-haul commuter service, and were less expensive to operate in this context than a traditional diesel locomotive-drawn train with coaches. The cars could be used singly or coupled together in train sets and controlled from the cab of the front unit. The RDC was one of the few DMU trains to achieve commercial success in North America. RDC trains were an early example of self-contained diesel multiple unit trains, an arrangement now in common use by railways all over the world.

Budd RDCs were sold to operators in North America, South America, Asia, and Australia. They saw extensive use in the Northeast United States, both on branch lines and in commuter service. As passenger service declined in the United States the RDC was often the last surviving conveyor of passengers on a particular route. Most RDCs were retired by the 1980s. The cars remain in service in Canada, where RDCs continue to on normally the Sudbury–White River line, and have remained in continuous use since their introduction in the 1950s.

The RDC inspired several derivatives, including the unsuccessful Budd SPV-2000. The New York Central Railroad installed two jet engines on an RDC in 1966 and set a United States speed record of 184 mph (296 km/h), although this experimental configuration was never used in regular service.

== Background ==
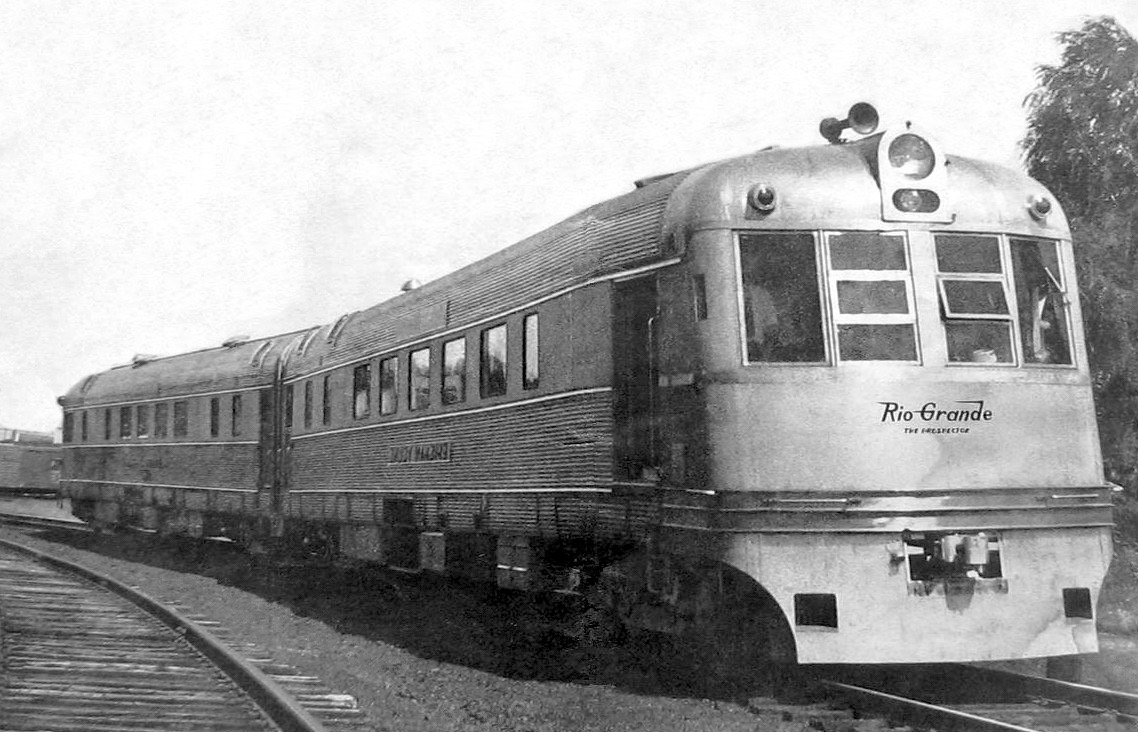
Budd's Prospector in 1941.

The self-propelled railcar was not a new concept in North American railroading. Beginning in the 1880s railroads experimented with steam-powered railcars on branch lines, where the costs of operating a conventional steam locomotive-hauled set of cars was prohibitive. These cars failed for several reasons: the boiler and engine were too heavy, water and fuel took up too much space, and high maintenance costs eliminated whatever advantage was gained from reducing labor costs. In the 1900s steam railcars gave way to gasoline, led by the McKeen Motor Car Company, which produced 152 between 1905 and 1917. The J. G. Brill Company sold over 300 railbuses in the 1920s. Newcomer Electro-Motive Corporation, working with the Winton Motor Carriage Company, dominated the market at the end of the 1920s but had left it completely by 1932 as the Great Depression gutted rail traffic.

The Budd Company entered the market in 1932, just as EMC left. Until then, Budd had been mainly an automotive parts subcontractor, but had pioneered methods for working with stainless steel, including the technique of shot welding to join stainless steel components. This permitted the construction of cars which were both light and strong. Budd partnered with Michelin to construct several rubber-tired stainless steel rail cars powered by gasoline and diesel engines. These saw service with the Reading Company, Pennsylvania Railroad, and Texas and Pacific Railway. The cars were under-powered, the tires proved prone to blowouts and derailments, and the cars were unsuccessful.

Budd revived its railcar concept after diesel engines with a suitable combination of power and weight became available in 1938, although with more conventional steel wheels. In 1941 Budd built the Prospector for the Denver and Rio Grande Western Railroad. This was a two-car diesel multiple unit. Each car had a pair of 192 horsepower (143 kW) diesel engines and was capable of independent operation. The cars were constructed of stainless steel and included a mix of coach and sleeping accommodations. The design was popular with the public but undone by the difficult operating conditions on the D&RGW. It was withdrawn in July 1942, apparently another failure. However, several technical advances during the Second World War encouraged Budd to try again.

== Design ==
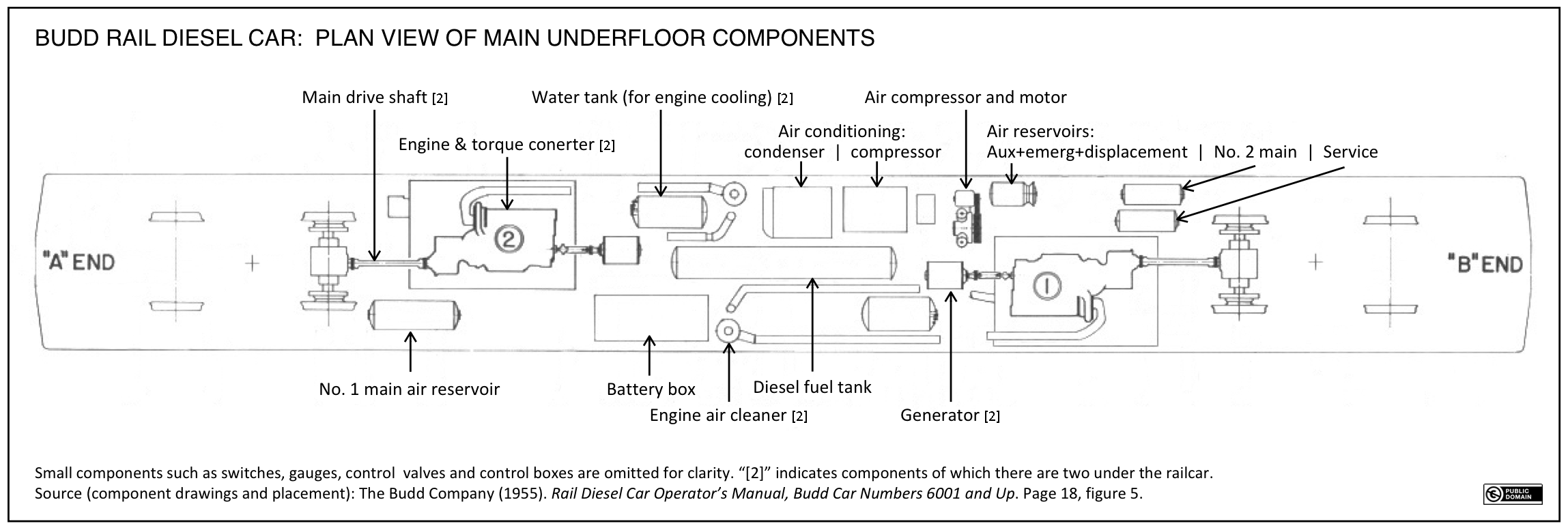
Layout of RDC underfloor components

During the years of the Second World War, there were improvements in the lightweight Detroit Diesel engines and, just as importantly, the hydraulic torque converter. (Note: When the railcar accelerated above 50 miles per hour (80 kilometres per hour), the transmission went from torque converter to direct final drive; it reverted to torque converter when the speed fell below 50 mph.) Budd, which by then had produced more than 2,500 streamlined cars for various railroads, took a standard 85-foot (26 m) coach design and added a pair of 275 hp (205 kW) 6-cylinder Detroit Diesel Series 110 engines. Each drove an axle through a hydraulic torque converter derived from the M46 Patton tank, for a 1A-A1 wheel arrangement. The top speed for the design was 85 miles per hour (137 km/h). The control systems allowed the cars to operate singly, or in multiple. The result was the RDC-1, which made its public debut at Chicago's Union Station on September 19, 1949.

=== Variants ===
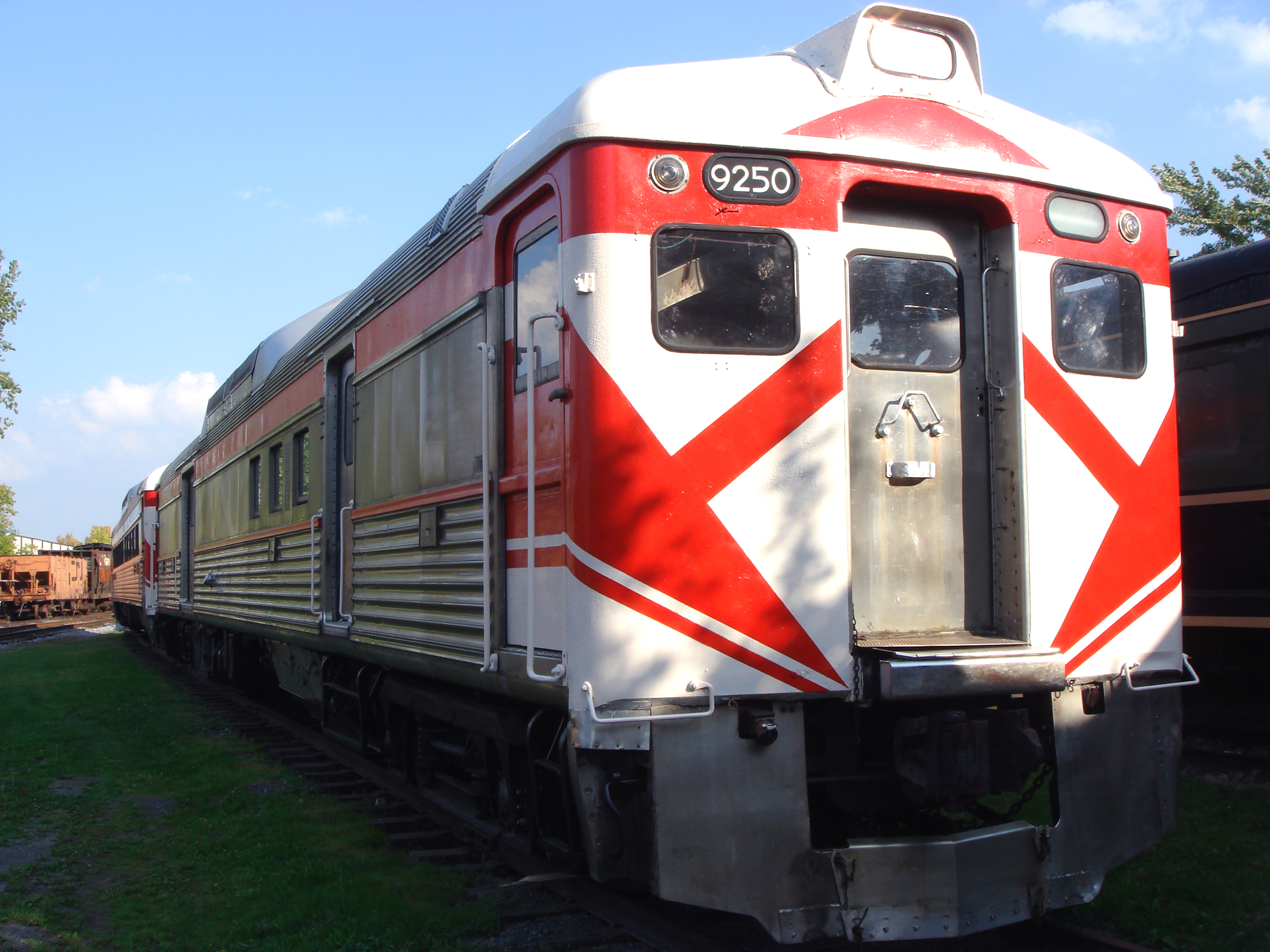
An ex-Canadian Pacific Railway RDC-4 in 2007

Budd manufactured five basic variants of the RDC:

- The RDC-1: an 85 ft (25.91 m) all-passenger coach seating 90 passengers. It weighed 118,300 pounds (53.7 t) empty.
- The RDC-2: an 85 ft (25.91 m) baggage and passenger coach configuration (combine) seating 70 passengers. The baggage area was 17 ft (5.18 m) long. It weighed 114,200 pounds (51.8 t) empty.
- The RDC-3: an 85 ft (25.91 m) variant with a railway post office, a baggage compartment and 48 passenger seats. It weighed 117,900 pounds (53.5 t) empty.
- The RDC-4: a 73 ft 10 in (22.50 m) variant with only the railway post office and baggage area. It weighed 109,200 pounds (49.5 t) empty.
- The RDC-9: an 85 ft (25.91 m) passenger trailer seating 94, a single 300-horsepower (220 kW) engine and no control cab.

Several railroads used the designation "RDC-5": the Canadian Pacific Railway for RDC-2s converted to full-coach configuration and the Canadian National Railway for RDC-9s it purchased from the Boston and Maine Railroad. The Baltimore and Ohio Railroad had a pair of its RDC-2s equipped with a small kitchen, 24 seats in a dining area, and 24 seats in a coach section. One is preserved at the B&O Railroad Museum.

In 1956, Budd introduced a new version of the RDC, with several improvements. The new cars had more powerful versions of the Detroit Diesel 6-110 engines, each of which produced 300 horsepower (220 kW) instead of 275 horsepower (205 kW). They also featured higher-capacity air conditioning and more comfortable seating. The appearance changed slightly as well: the side fluting continued around to the front of the car and the front-facing windows were smaller.

=== Jet propulsion ===
In an experiment toward high-speed rail, the New York Central Railroad fitted a pair of General Electric J47 jet engines from a Convair B-36, complete in their twinned nacelle from the bomber's engine installation, atop one of their RDCs and added a shovel nose front (much like a later automotive air dam) to its cab, but extended upwards, covering the entire front end. This RDC, which NYC had numbered M497, set the United States speed record in 1966 when it traveled at just short of 184 mph (296 km/h) between Butler, Indiana, and Stryker, Ohio. It was never intended that jet engines propel regular trains. With high-speed trains advancing overseas, particularly the Japanese Shinkansen bullet trains, American railroads were under pressure from the federal government to catch up. The test runs and subsequent American rail speed record set on July 23, 1966, provided valuable data on the interaction between flanged wheels and rail at high speeds, as well as stress on wheel bearings and track infrastructure.

At the same time the test took place, the Central announced plans to discontinue most of its long-distance trains, including the renowned 20th Century Limited. Trains editor David P. Morgan observed that "...[the New York] Central will never quite convince anyone that the RDC's jet exploit was more a scientific feat than a calculated circus to take the curse off the Century's funeral notice." Historian Chuck Crouse expressed skepticism in 1990 about the test's usefulness: "What, if anything, did the tests prove is anyone's guess."

=== Derivatives ===
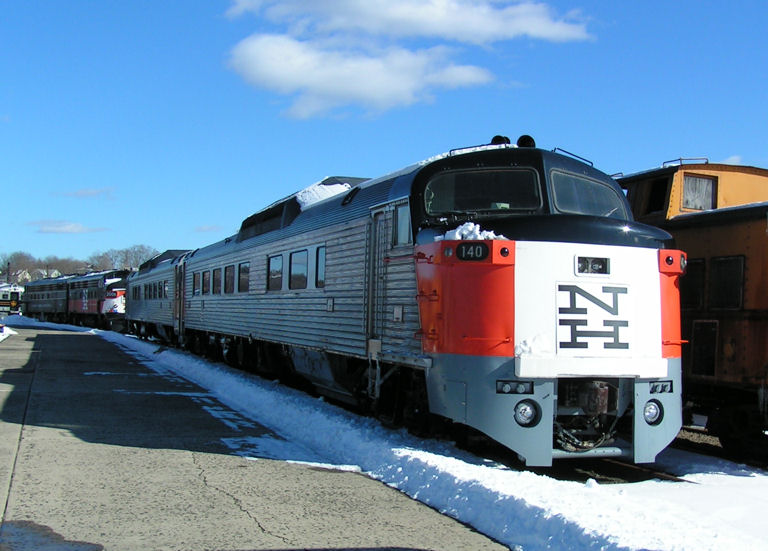
The Roger Williams at the Danbury Railway Museum in 2006

In 1956, the New York, New Haven and Hartford Railroad ordered a custom-built, six-car train set they named the Roger Williams, based on the RDC design. It consisted of two single-ended cab units and four intermediate cars to make a complete train. The units were fitted with third-rail shoes, electric traction motors, and associated gear for operation into Grand Central Terminal, though this was short-lived. In the New Haven's later years, the set was broken up, and used with regular New Haven RDCs, and by Amtrak into the 1980s.

In 1961, five cars were built under license in Australia for the Department of Railways New South Wales. They were shorter and narrower than the North American models.

In 1966, Tokyu Car built 31 DR2700 series cars for the Taiwan Railway Administration. Tokyu got a licence from the Budd Company and the bodywork of the DR2700 series was based on the RDC. There were 25 powered driving cars (each with a Cummins diesel engine producing 335 horsepower (250 kW)) and 6 trailers. The DR2700 series was the fastest train in the following decade with a top speed of 110 kilometres per hour (68 mph). They were withdrawn from regular service in 2014 while several powered driving cars were still active for special trains.

In the late 1970s Budd sought to replace the aging RDCs with a new design, the SPV-2000. The body shell was based on an Amfleet coach, not the RDC. Like the RDC it was 85 feet (26 m) long, stainless steel, and powered by twin diesel engines. The design was beset with mechanical problems, and Budd sold only 30 cars.

From 1982 to 1984 Tokyu Car built 45 of a heavily specialized, meter-gauge RDC design for the Taiwan Railway Administration under license from Budd. Designated the DR2800 series, the units are organized into 15 permanently-coupled three-car sets (30 powered driving cars and 15 trailers). Like other RDC trainsets before them, each cab unit only has a cab at one end and two cab units bracket a trailer in a standard set. Unlike other RDC sets, however, the trailer's diesel engine is used exclusively to provide head-end power for the entire three-car set, while the engines in the driver cars are used for propulsion. To prevent dependency on the trailer's engine for cooling, the cooling fans of the driver cars are driven hydraulically instead of electrically. This configuration results in each set producing 700 horsepower (520 kW) for a top speed of 110 kilometres per hour (68 mph). All 15 sets were still in service by 2022; they were withdrawn from service on April 26, 2023.

== History ==
=== United States ===
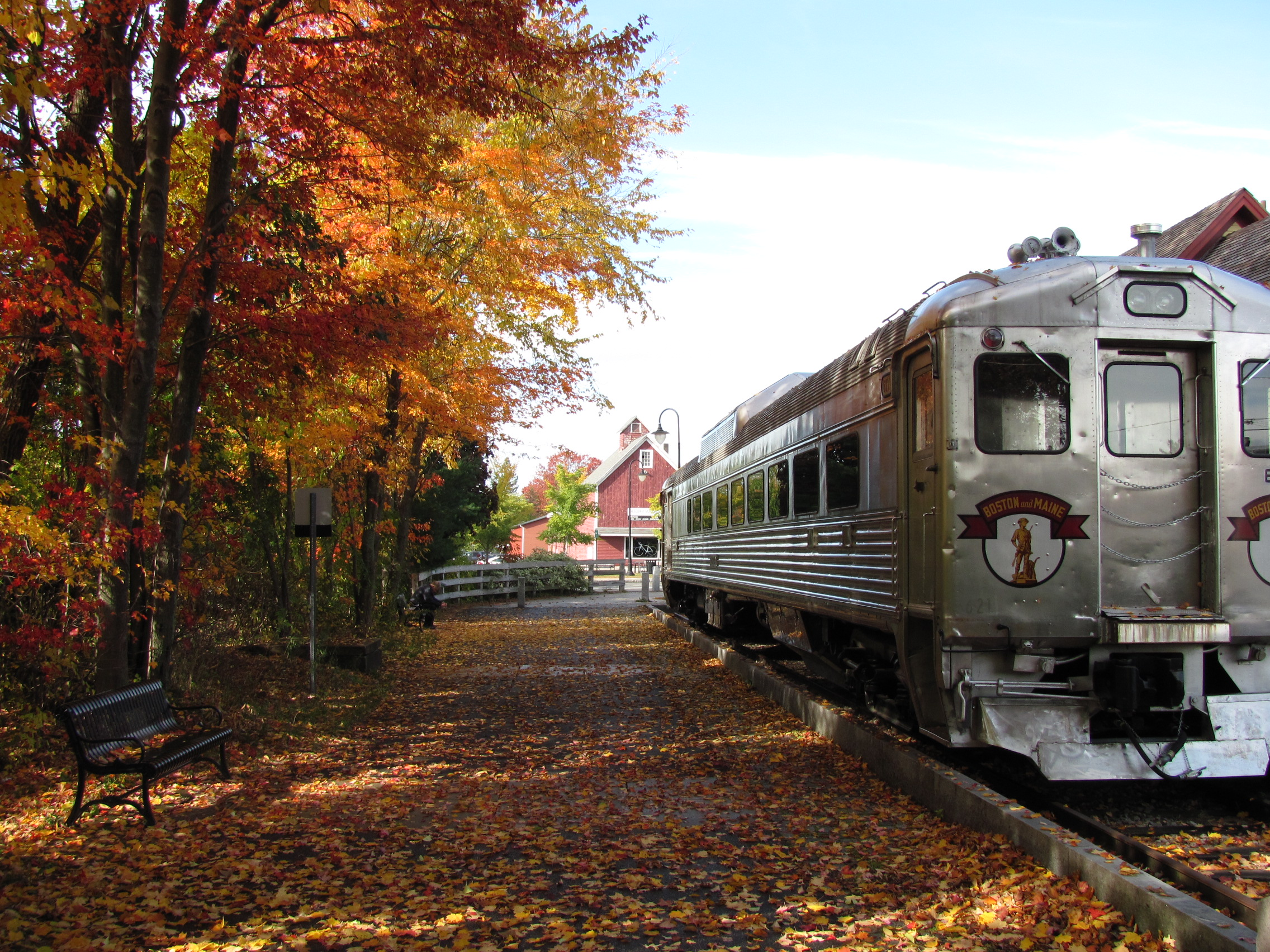
Ex-B&M RDC-2 No. 6211 at the Bedford Depot in 2010

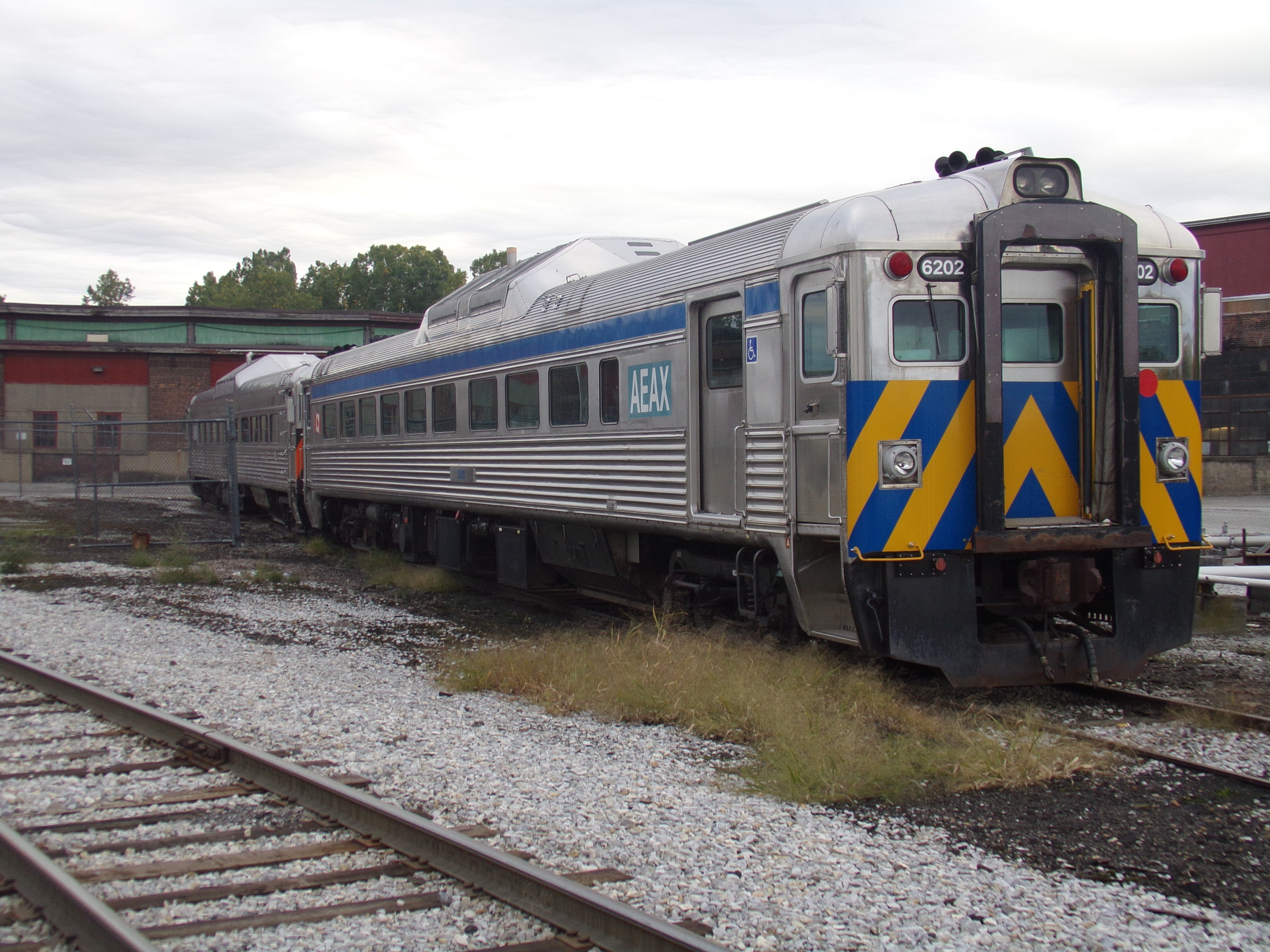
Two All Earth Rail RDCs at St. Albans, Vermont, in 2018

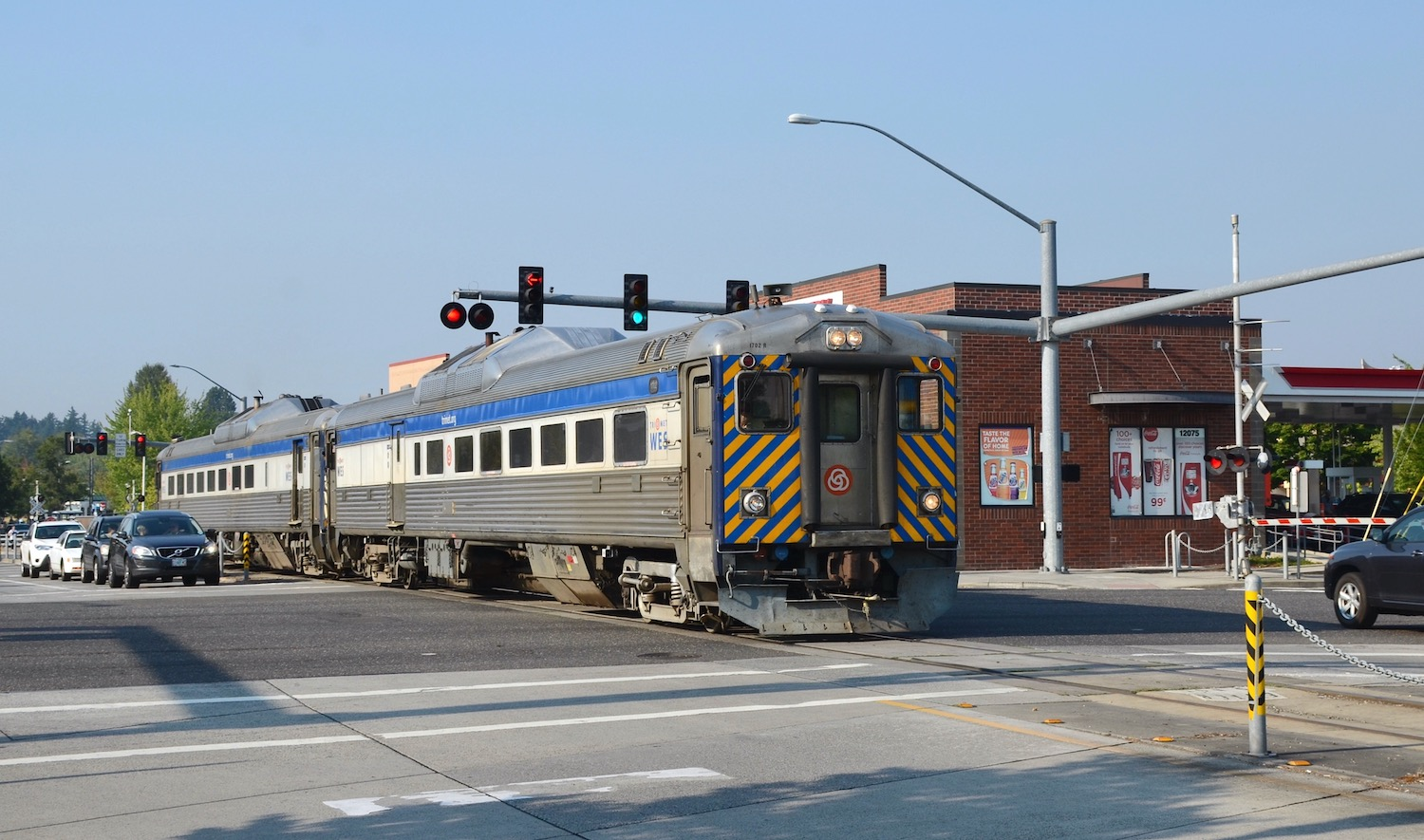
Ex-Alaska Railroad RDC-2 units in WES Commuter Rail service, in Oregon, in 2017

The vast majority of RDCs were owned and operated by railroads in the United States. They could be found on branch lines, short-haul intercity routes, commuter routes, and even long-distance trains. The Western Pacific Railroad used a pair of RDC-2s to operate the Zephyrette, a supplement to the California Zephyr. The two cars ran between Oakland, California and Salt Lake City, Utah, 924 miles (1,487 km), three days a week. Examples of shorter intercity services were the Chicago, Rock Island and Pacific Railroad's Memphis, Tennessee–Amarillo, Texas Choctaw Rocket and the Baltimore and Ohio Railroad's Daylight Speedliner. The latter ran between Pittsburgh and Philadelphia and included full dining service. A notable example of the RDC's flexibility occurred on the Pennsylvania-Reading Seashore Lines, where a single train would depart Camden, New Jersey and split into multiple trains to serve different destinations on the Atlantic coast.

The largest RDC fleets were in the Northeast United States. The New York, New Haven and Hartford Railroad (New Haven) acquired 40 RDCs, which it called "Shoreliners", in 1952–53. By 1955 these accounted for 65% of the New Haven's passenger routes. This achievement was eclipsed by the Boston and Maine Railroad, whose fleet grew to 108 by 1958. The B&M's RDCs operated 90% of the company's passenger routes, including its extensive commuter operations around Boston, Massachusetts.

The results in commuter service outside the B&M were mixed. Budd had not designed the RDC for commuter service and discouraged operators from using it to haul coaches. The Long Island Rail Road and Chicago and North Western Railway, which had extensive networks in Long Island and Chicago, respectively, evaluated the RDC but made few orders. Conversely, the Reading Company's 12 RDC-1s lasted on the Philadelphia–Reading and Philadelphia–Bethlehem routes well into the SEPTA era.

For several railroads the RDCs, because of their low overall cost and operational flexibility, were the last passenger trains in operation. Examples include the Duluth, Missabe, and Iron Range Railway, the Duluth, South Shore and Atlantic Railway, the Lehigh Valley Railroad, and the Northwestern Pacific Railroad, where RDC service survived until the formation of Amtrak in 1971.

Many RDCs remained in service throughout the 1970s and 1980s. Amtrak acquired 24 (including three from the Roger Williams), mostly for use in Connecticut. The Massachusetts Bay Transportation Authority (MBTA) acquired the B&M's fleet and continued operating them until 1985. The Alaska Railroad acquired five RDCs, three from SEPTA and two from Amtrak between 1984 and 1986. These were all sold or out of service by 2009. Trinity Railway Express acquired thirteen RDCs from Via Rail in 1993 for use on commuter service between Dallas and Fort Worth, Texas. The Denton County Transportation Authority leased several for A-train service pending the arrival of new Stadler GTW 2/6s diesel multiple units.

Despite their advanced age, a market for Budd RDCs has continued. Oregonian transit authority TriMet purchased and refurbished two RDCs in 2009 to provide backup for its commuter rail service, WES, following reliability issues with the primary DMUs for that service, which had been purpose-built by Colorado Railcar. In 2017, a Vermont company, AllEarth Rail, bought twelve 1959 Budd cars from Dallas Area Rapid Transit for $5 million. The cars had previously been owned by Via Rail Canada, which also bid on the lot. AllEarth said it planned to use the cars for commuter rail service in Vermont, possibly starting with a Burlington-to-Montpelier route. TriMet subsequently purchased two of these cars from AllEarth later the same year, in addition to its existing two, instead of acquiring new Nippon Sharyo DMU trains. TriMet stated the Ex-AllEarth RDCs would enter revenue service on the WES in 2021; however, those plans were postponed indefinitely in view of a COVID-19 pandemic-related ridership decline.

=== Canada ===
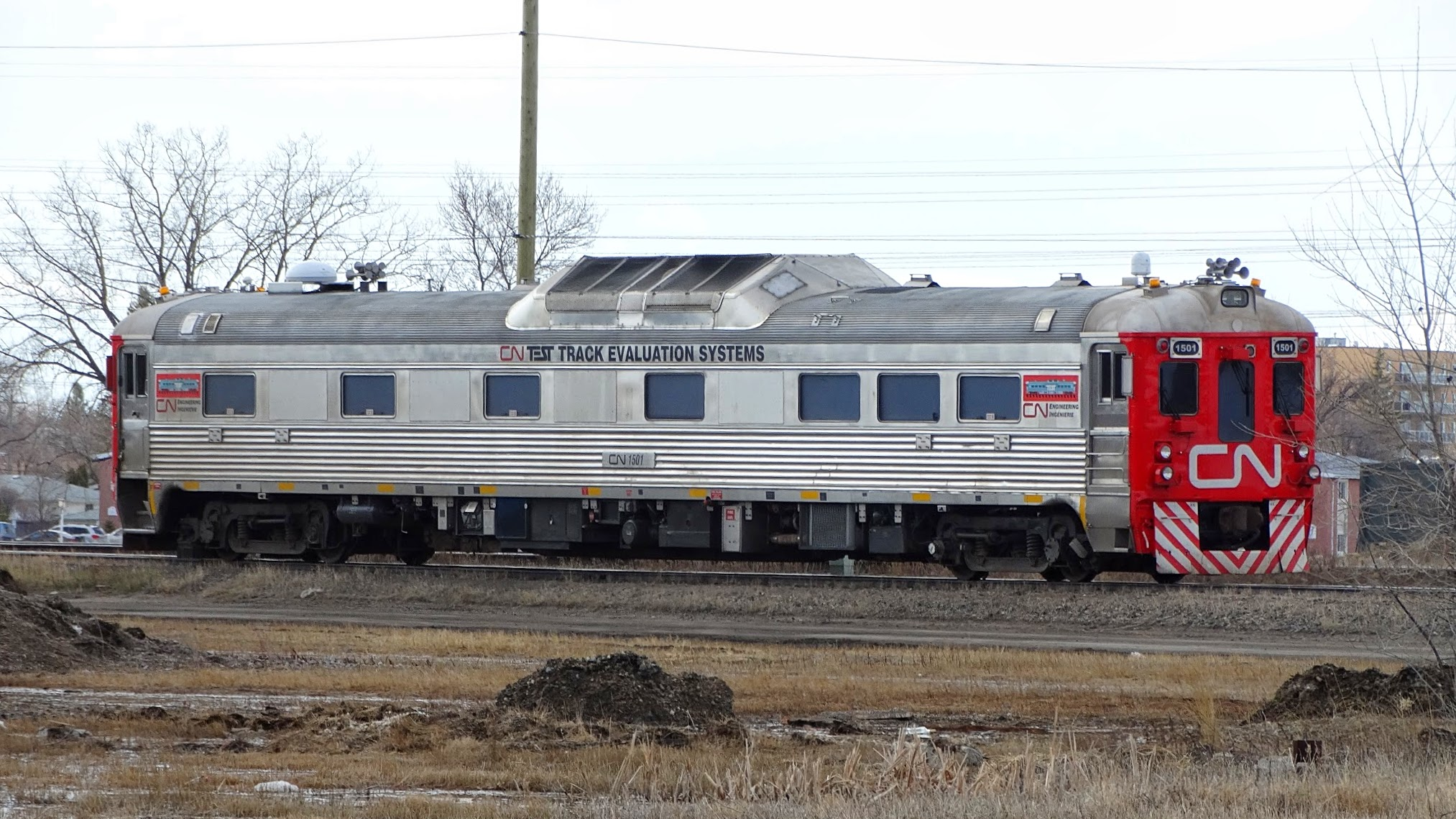
Canadian National RDC-1 No. 1501 at Portage Junction in Winnipeg on May 2, 2014.

Both the Canadian National Railway (CN) and Canadian Pacific Railway (CP) purchased RDCs, some of which were built under license from Budd by Canadian Car and Foundry. The Canadian National purchased 25 cars outright, and acquired many more second-hand from the Boston and Maine Railroad. These cars, which CN called Railiners, were used primarily on secondary passenger routes. CP purchased 53 cars. The first one ran on November 9, 1954, between Detroit and Toronto. It was the first stainless-steel passenger train to operate in Canada. CP used the RDCs, which it called Dayliners, throughout its system. CP also made extensive use of them on commuter trains around Montreal and Toronto. The Dominion Atlantic Railway (CP's subsidiary in Nova Scotia) also operated two RDCs lettered for its line.

Via Rail inherited many of these cars when it took over CN and CP passenger services in 1978. Via continues to use RDCs on the Sudbury–White River train in Ontario.

Another Canadian purchaser of RDCs was the Pacific Great Eastern Railway, which operated passenger service between North Vancouver and Prince George. RDCs continued to operate on this route until all passenger service ended under BC Rail, PGE's successor, in 2002.

Refurbished RDCs were considered for Blue22, a rail service between Toronto Union Station and Pearson Airport, by 2010. The service, which was transferred to Metrolinx ownership and opened in 2015 as the Union Pearson Express, ultimately used new Nippon Sharyo DMU trains instead.

=== Australia ===
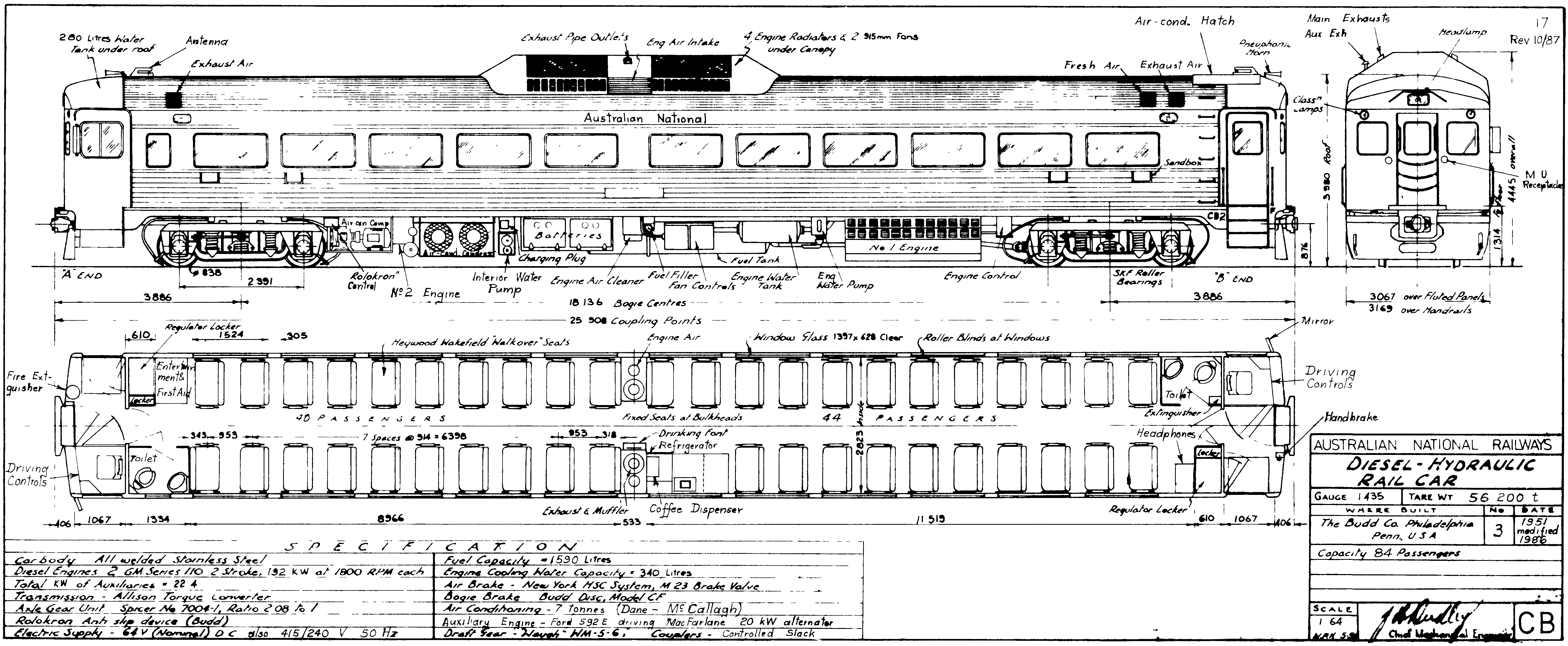
Official drawing of an Australian National Railways Commission CB class railcar, a standard RDC-1 model

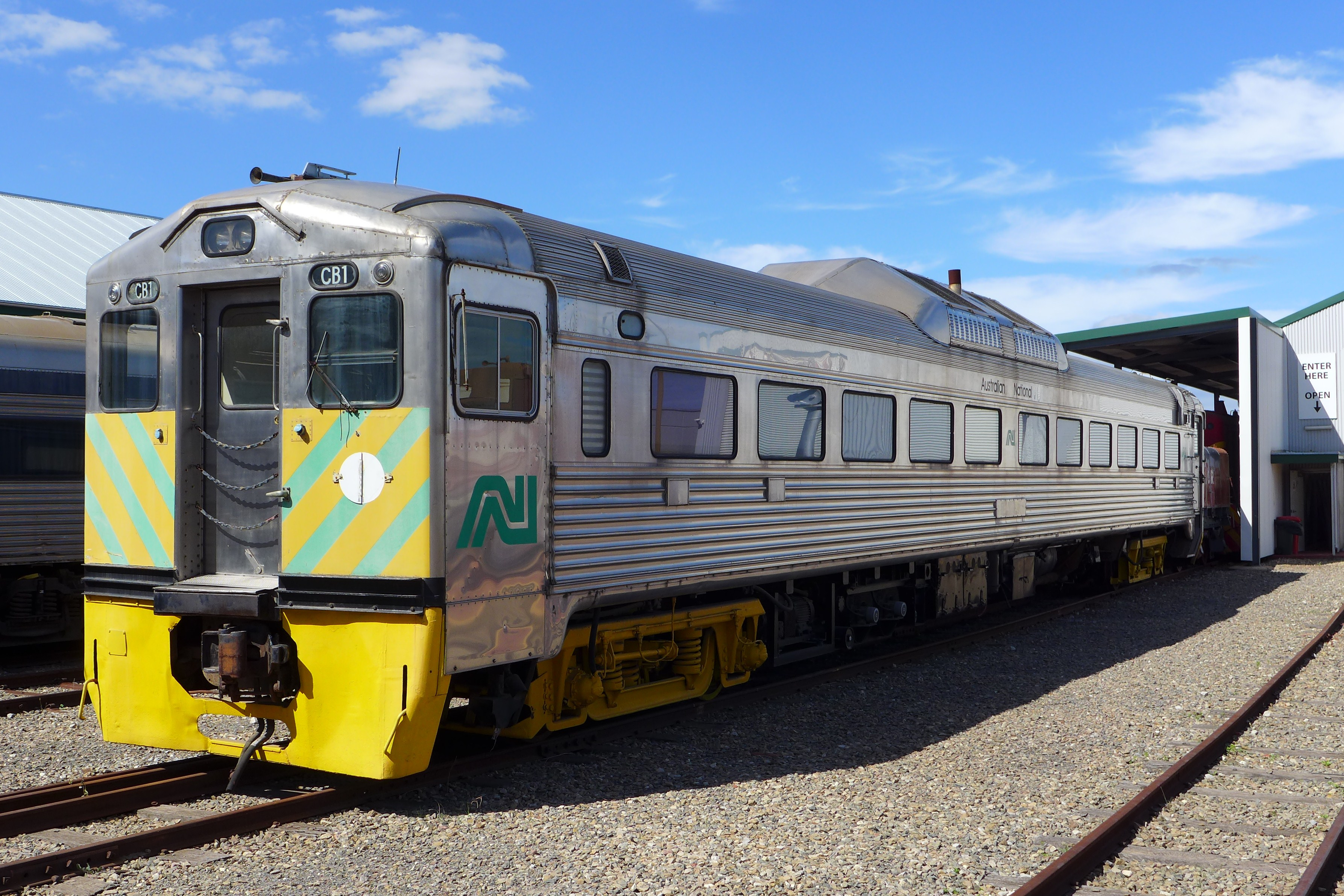
Commonwealth Railways, later Australian National Railways Commission railcar no. CB1 at the National Railway Museum, Port Adelaide, South Australia. These RDCs ran on long-distance lines in the South Australian Outback.

In 1951, the Budd Company exported three standard RDC-1 railcars to Australia, which Budd engineer Joseph F. Grosser accompanied. Designated the CB class, they ran on the 4 ft 8 1/2 in (1435 mm) standard-gauge Commonwealth Railways lines in the sparsely populated north of South Australia not served by the South Australian Railways. Invariably referred to as "Budd cars", they operated between Port Pirie, Woomera, Tarcoola, Marree and Whyalla.

In July 1975, when the Commonwealth Railways were succeeded by the Australian National Railways Commission (successively branded as ANR, Australian National and AN), they were withdrawn from service and stored. In 1986, however, they were reinstated on the Iron Triangle Limited service from Adelaide to Whyalla and the Silver City Limited service from Broken Hill. The cars were withdrawn from service in 1990. As of 2024, CB1 was preserved at the National Railway Museum, Port Adelaide; CB2 and CB3 were privately owned.

In 1961, Commonwealth Engineering built five RDC-1 derivative cars in Australia under licence for the New South Wales railways department. Four were self-propelled and one was a trailer car. Allocated as the 1100 class, they followed Budd car layouts but were smaller than standard RDC-1 models, being 8.0 feet (2.4 metres) shorter at 77.0 feet (23.5 metres) and built to a New South Wales Railways loading gauge smaller than that of North American railroads (and Commonwealth Railways). The trailer car was built with a buffet/snack bar in one end. The cars worked the South Coast Daylight Express between Sydney and Bomaderry. Age and mechanical problems led to the cars' conversion to locomotive-hauled coaches, beginning in 1982; the last self-propelled run occurred in 1986.

=== Brazil ===
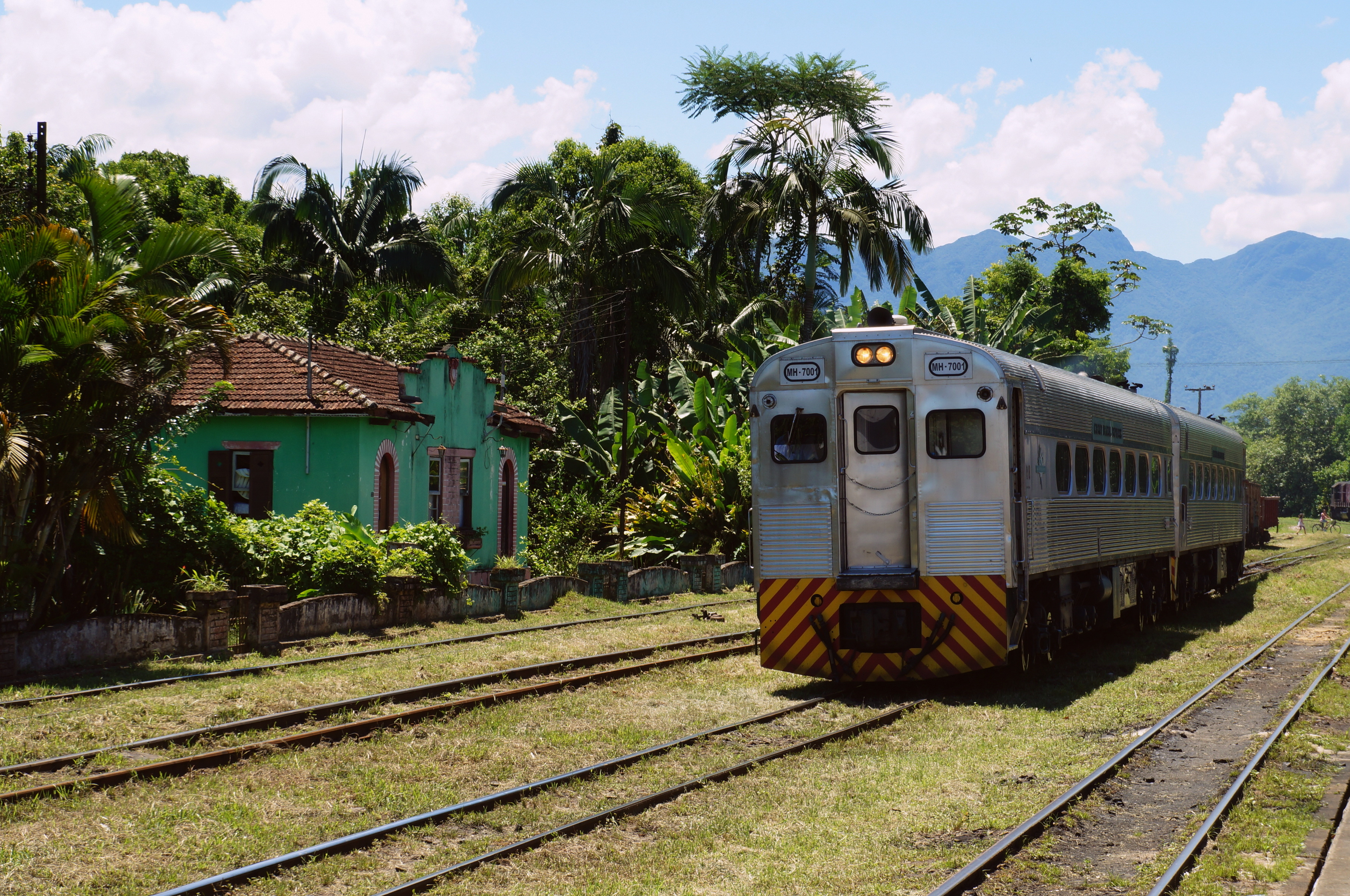
One of the Pioneer III-derived metre gauge RDCs in excursion service at Morretes in 2014

RFFSA (Brazilian Federal Railways) purchased four RDC-1s and two RDC-2s in 1958. These were 1,600 mm (5 ft 3 in) gauge but otherwise standard configuration. RFFSA ordered 23 more cars in 1962–1963. Four of these were 1,600 mm (5 ft 3 in) gauge RDC-1s. The other 19 were 1,000 mm (3 ft 3 3/8 in) gauge and varied considerably from the standard RDC-1 design. The car body was based on the Pioneer III coach. Internal seating was 48 with a small buffet area or 56 in an all-coach configuration. Several RDCs remain active on the Serra Verde Express tourist train.

=== Cuba ===
In the 1950s, both major railway companies in Cuba purchased RDCs. Consolidated Railways of Cuba (Ferrocarriles Consolidados de Cuba) ordered 11 RDC-1s and 5 RDC-2s in 1950. These operated either singly or in multiple units of up to three cars. The Western Railways of Cuba (Ferrocarriles Occidentales de Cuba) ordered four RDC-1s and six RDC-3s in 1956–57. The cars remained in use after the Cuban Revolution with the Ferrocarriles de Cuba and operated into the 1980s. At least one Cuban RDC-1 still existed in 2017, stripped of all mechanical components and serving as a passenger coach.

=== Saudi Arabia ===
The Arabian American Oil Company constructed a standard gauge railway in cooperation with the Saudi government. The company ordered three RDC-2s in 1951, supplemented by a fourth in 1958. The cars operated on various routes originating in Dammam. All were converted to unpowered trailers by 1965.

== Original owners ==
Budd constructed 398 RDCs between 1949 and 1962. The table below does not include the six cars which comprised the Roger Williams, nor derivative designs built under license.

Railroad	Model	Quantity	Road numbers
Arabian American Oil Company	RDC-2	4	8000–8003
Atchison, Topeka and Santa Fe Railway	RDC-1 (Note: After a wreck in 1956, DC-192 was rebuilt as an RDC-2.)	2	DC-191, DC-192
Baltimore and Ohio Railroad	RDC-1	12	1908–1911, 6510–6517
Baltimore and Ohio Railroad	RDC-2	4	1960–1961, 6550–6551
Boston and Maine Railroad	RDC-1	57	6100–6156
Boston and Maine Railroad	RDC-2	15	6200–6214
Boston and Maine Railroad	RDC-3	7	6300–6306
Boston and Maine Railroad	RDC-9	30	6900–6929
Budd (prototype/demonstrator)	RDC-1	1	2960
Canadian National Railways	RDC-1	9	D-200–D-201, D-102–D-108
Canadian National Railways	RDC-2	5	D-201–D-203, D-205, D-250
Canadian National Railways	RDC-3	5	D-100–D-101, D-302, D-351–D-352
Canadian National Railways	RDC-4	6	D-150–D-151, D-401–D-402, D-451–D-452
Canadian Pacific Railway	RDC-1	23	9050–9072
Canadian Pacific Railway	RDC-2	22	9100–9115, 9194–9199
Canadian Pacific Railway	RDC-3	5	9020–9024
Canadian Pacific Railway	RDC-4	3	9200, 9250–9251
Central Railroad of New Jersey	RDC-1	7	551–557
Chicago and Eastern Illinois Railroad	RDC-1	1	RDC1
Chicago and North Western Railway	RDC-1	2	9933–9934
Chicago and North Western Railway	RDC-2	1	9935
Chicago, Rock Island and Pacific Railroad	RDC-3	5	9002–9004, 9015–9016
Commonwealth Railways (Australia) (later named Australian National Railways)	RDC-1	3	CB1–CB3
Consolidated Railways of Cuba	RDC-1	11	
Consolidated Railways of Cuba	RDC-2	5	
Dominion Atlantic Railway	RDC-1	2	9058-9059
Duluth, Missabe and Iron Range Railway	RDC-3	1	1
Duluth, South Shore and Atlantic Railway	RDC-1	1	500
Duluth, Winnipeg and Pacific Railway	RDC-3	1	D301
Grand Trunk Western Railroad	RDC-2	1	D204
Grand Trunk Western Railroad	RDC-3	1	D303
Great Northern Railway	RDC-3	1	2350
Lehigh Valley Railroad	RDC-1	1	40
Lehigh Valley Railroad	RDC-2	1	41
Long Island Rail Road	RDC-1	1	3101
Long Island Rail Road	RDC-2	1	3121
Minneapolis and St. Louis Railway	RDC-4	2	32–33
Missouri-Kansas-Texas Railroad	RDC-3	1	20
New York Central Railroad	RDC-1	16	M-451–M-465
New York Central Railroad	RDC-2	1	M-480
New York Central Railroad	RDC-3	3	M-497–M-499
New York, New Haven and Hartford Railroad	RDC-1	29	20–48
New York, New Haven and Hartford Railroad	RDC-2	2	120–121
New York, New Haven and Hartford Railroad	RDC-3	6	125–130
New York, New Haven and Hartford Railroad	RDC-4	3	135–137
New York, Susquehanna and Western Railway	RDC-1	4	M-1–M-4
Northern Pacific Railway	RDC-2	1	B30
Northern Pacific Railway	RDC-3	2	B40–B41
Pacific Great Eastern Railway	RDC-1	3	BC10–BC12
Pacific Great Eastern Railway	RDC-3	4	BC30–BC33
Pennsylvania-Reading Seashore Lines	RDC-1	12	M-402–M-413
Reading Company	RDC-1	12	9151–9162
RFFSA (Brazil)	RDC-1	8	ED11–ED14, M504–M505, M552–M553 (Note: 1,600 mm (5 ft 3 in) gauge.)
RFFSA (Brazil)	RDC-1	19	M600–M610, M700–M707 (Note: 1,000 mm (3 ft 3 3/8 in) gauge. Varied from the standard RDC-1 design; see #Brazil for details.)
RFFSA (Brazil)	RDC-2	2	ED51–ED52
Southern Pacific Railroad	RDC-1	1	10
Western Pacific Railroad	RDC-2	2	375–376
Western Railroad of Cuba	RDC-1	4	901–904
Western Railroad of Cuba	RDC-3	6	951–956

== Preservation ==
Numerous RDCs have been preserved on tourist lines and in museums. Holders include:

- Alberta Central Railway Museum
- Bedford Depot
- Berkshire Scenic Railway Museum
- B&O Railroad Museum
- Bellefonte Historical Railroad Society
- Cape May Seashore Lines
- Conway Scenic Railroad
- Danbury Railway Museum
- Hobo Railroad
- Idaho Northern and Pacific Railroad
- Illinois Railway Museum
- Lehigh Gorge Scenic Railway
- National Railway Museum [of Australia]
- New Hope Valley Railway
- North Shore Scenic Railroad
- Orford Express
- Port of Tillamook Bay Railroad
- Railroad Museum of Pennsylvania
- Railway Museum of British Columbia
- Rapido Trains
- Reading, Blue Mountain and Northern
- Reading Railroad Heritage Museum
- Waterloo Central Railway

== See also ==
- X 2051 (in French), a French-built derivative prototype
- South Australian Railways Bluebird railcar
- V/Line VLocity, currently built by Bombardier Australia
- Taiwan Railway DR2700 series

== Select bibliography ==
- Budd Company (March 1, 1953). Budd Rail Diesel Car: General Manual (PDF).
- Brown, Ron (2012). Rails Across the Prairies: The Railway Heritage of Canada's Prairie Provinces. Toronto: Dundurn. ISBN 978-1-4597-0215-8.
- Crouse, Chuck (February 1989). "Whooosh!". Trains. Vol. 49, no. 4. pp. 26–29. ISSN 0041-0934.
- Crouse, Chuck (1990). Budd Car, the RDC Story. Mineola, New York: Weekend Chief Publishing. ISBN 978-0-9612814-2-7.
- Duke, Donald; Keilty, Edmund (1990). RDC: The Budd Rail Diesel Car. San Marino, California: Golden West Books. ISBN 978-0-87095-103-9.
- Dunn, John (2006). Comeng: A History of Commonwealth Engineering Volume 1: 1921-1955. Kenthurst, New South Wales: Rosenberg Publishing. ISBN 978-1-877058-42-4.
- Leopard, John (2005). Duluth, Missabe & Iron Range Railway. St. Paul, Minnesota: MBI. ISBN 978-0-7603-1762-4.
- Lynch, Peter E. (2005). New Haven Railroad passenger trains. St. Paul, Minnesota: MBI Publishing Company. ISBN 978-0-7603-2288-8.
- Middleton, William D. (2000). "Diesel Railcar: A Look Ahead". Railroad History.
- Morgan, David P. (October 1966). "Where the action is?". Trains. Vol. 26, no. 12. pp. 3–4. ISSN 0041-0934.
- Neve, Peter (September 1990). "The Budd Rail Cars of the New South Wales Railways". Bulletin. 41 (635). Australian Railway Historical Society: 207–221.
- Oakley, Myrna (May 1, 2012). Oregon Off the Beaten Path: A Guide to Unique Places. Guilford, Connecticut: GPP Travel. ISBN 978-0-7627-7952-9.
- Schultz, Jeffrey T. (June 2018). "Railway island paradise". Trains. Vol. 78, no. 6. pp. 30–37. ISSN 0041-0934.
- Schwieterman, Joseph P. (2001). When the Railroad Leaves Town: American Communities in the Age of Rail Line Abandonment, Eastern United States. Kirksville, Missouri: Truman State University Press. ISBN 978-0-943549-97-2.
- Setti, João Bosco (2008). Brazilian Railroads. Rio de Janeiro: Memória do Trem. ISBN 978-85-86094-0-95.
- Simon, Elbert; Warner, David C. (2011). Holland, Kevin J. (ed.). Amtrak by the Numbers: A Comprehensive Passenger Car and Motive Power Roster – 1971–2011. Kansas City, Missouri: White River Productions. ISBN 978-1-932804-12-6.
- Solomon, Brian (2016). Field Guide to Trains: Locomotives and Rolling Stock. Minneapolis, Minnesota: Voyageur Press. ISBN 978-0-7603-4997-7.
- Staufer, Alvin (1981). New York Central's Later Power, 1910-1968. Medina, Ohio: A. F. Staufer. OCLC 8493163.
- Zhaoxu, Su (2014). "DR2800 Diesel Zu-Chiang Express Train". Taiwan Railroad Administration Equipment Encyclopedia (in Chinese) (3rd ed.). ISBN 978-98-65903-4-04.
