= Bellefonte Historical Railroad Society =

- Established: 1984
- Location: Bellefonte, Pennsylvania
- Type: Historical Society
- Director: Daniel M. Durachko
- Website: bellefontetrain.org

The Bellefonte Historical Railroad Society (BHRS) is an all-volunteer historical society dedicated to promoting, preserving, and fostering a public appreciation of the railroading heritage of Bellefonte and Centre County, Pennsylvania. The Society is a 501(c)(3) not-for-profit corporation with no paid employees or administrators.

The Society owns several historic pieces of rolling stock including two Budd RDC-1 rail diesel cars (BHRX 9153 and BHRX 9167), an NE class wooden caboose, originally built for the New York, New Haven and Hartford Railroad, a Russell snow plow, and four speeder cars. The caboose and snow plow are on static display in Talleyrand Park, Bellefonte, Pennsylvania adjacent to the former Bellefonte Pennsylvania Railroad train station.

The Bellefonte Historical Railroad Society hosts various passenger excursions throughout the year, as well as special events involving operation of the speeder cars. The Society began overhaul of Budd RDC-1 BHRX 9167 in 2014. The Society resumed operation of 9167 after an extensive mechanical restoration by Rail Mechanical Services, Inc. of Columbia, Pennsylvania in October 2023. In February 2024, the Society began a mechanical and cosmetic restoration of RDC-1 BHRX 9153, which was completed in December of the same year.

Volunteers also maintain the track structure and right-of-way on approximately 1 mile of Society owned track in and near the village of Lemont. The track is a portion of the historic Lewisburg and Tyrone Railroad, a branch line of the Pennsylvania Railroad.
