= DR2700 series =

Former passenger train in Taiwan

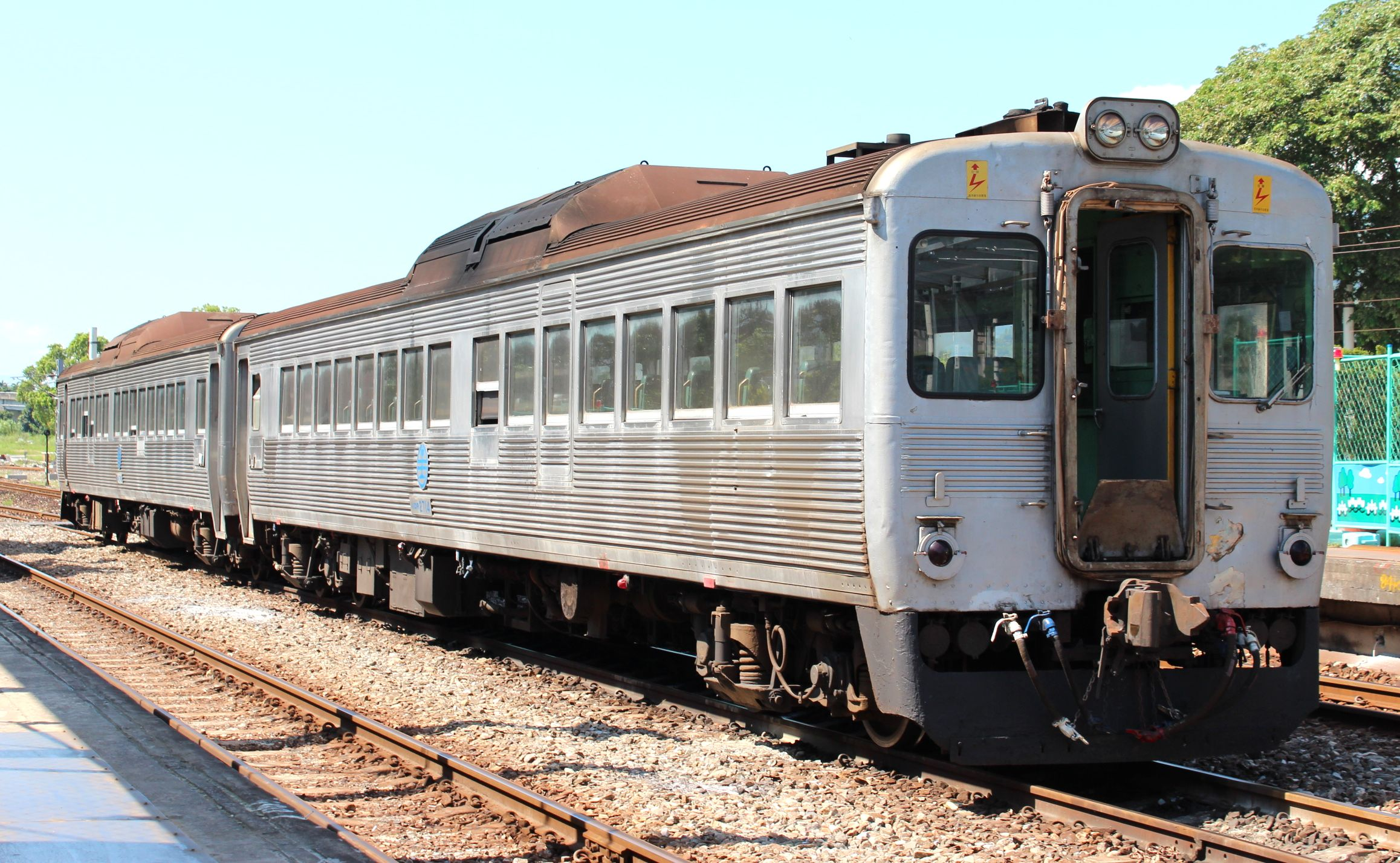
- A DR2700 series train at Yuli Station
- In service: 1966–2014
- Manufacturer: Tokyu Car Corporation
- Refurbished: 1983–1990
- Number built: 31 vehicles
- Number preserved: 4 vehicles (as of April 2017)
- Number scrapped: 27 vehicles
- Operators: Taiwan Railways Administration

Specifications
- Prime mover(s): Cummins NHHRTO-6-B1 (original); Cummins NT855-R4 (modification)
- Transmission: Niigata Tekkō DBSFG-100
- HVAC: Forced-air ventilation
- Bogies: TS-122
- Braking system(s): SMEE electromagnetic air and hand brake
- Safety system(s): ATS-SN, ATS-P, ATP
- Track gauge: 1,067 mm (3 ft 6 in)

The DR2700 series, also locally affectionately known as the "White Steel Train", was a series of diesel multiple unit trains used by the Taiwan Railways Administration. They were originally built by Tokyu Car Corporation of Japan in 1966, in response to an order by the Taiwan Railways Administration, because of the need to renew the rolling stock on the by then 10-year-old Flying Formosan Express service.

== History ==
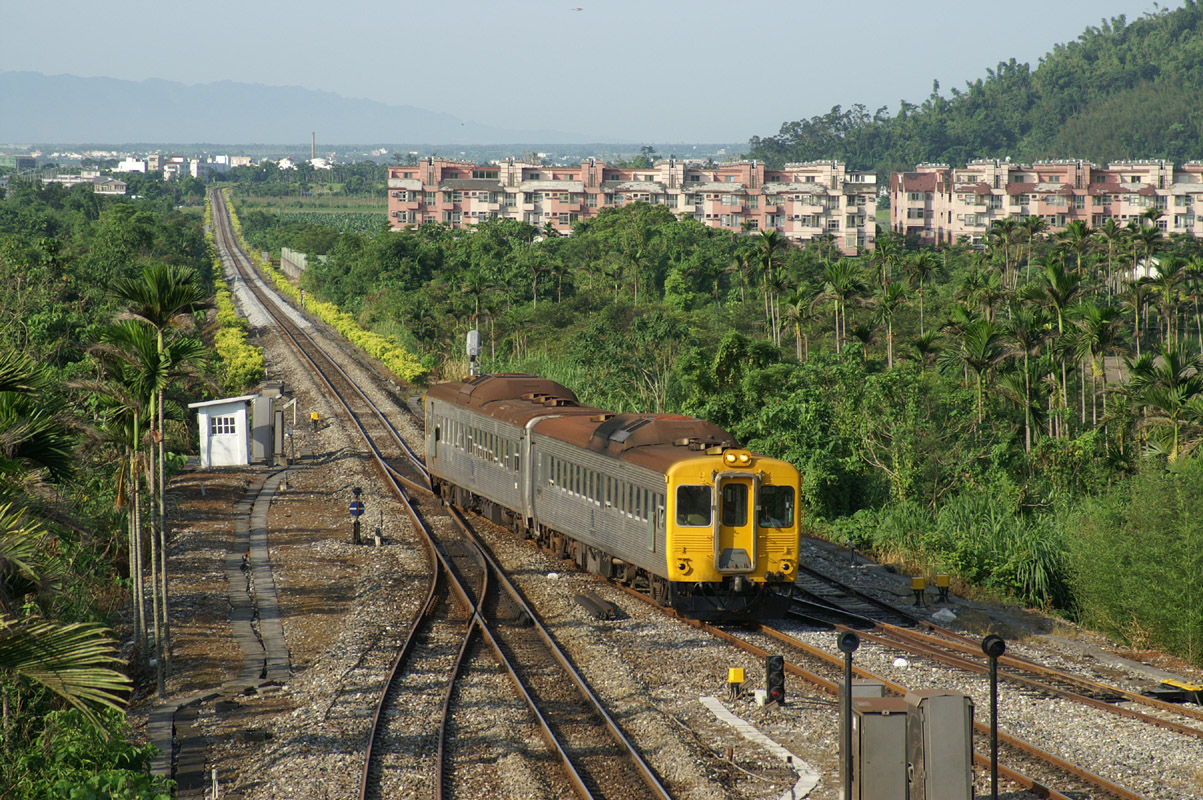
By 2006, the DR2700 DMU was operating as an ordinary passenger local train on the Taitung Line.

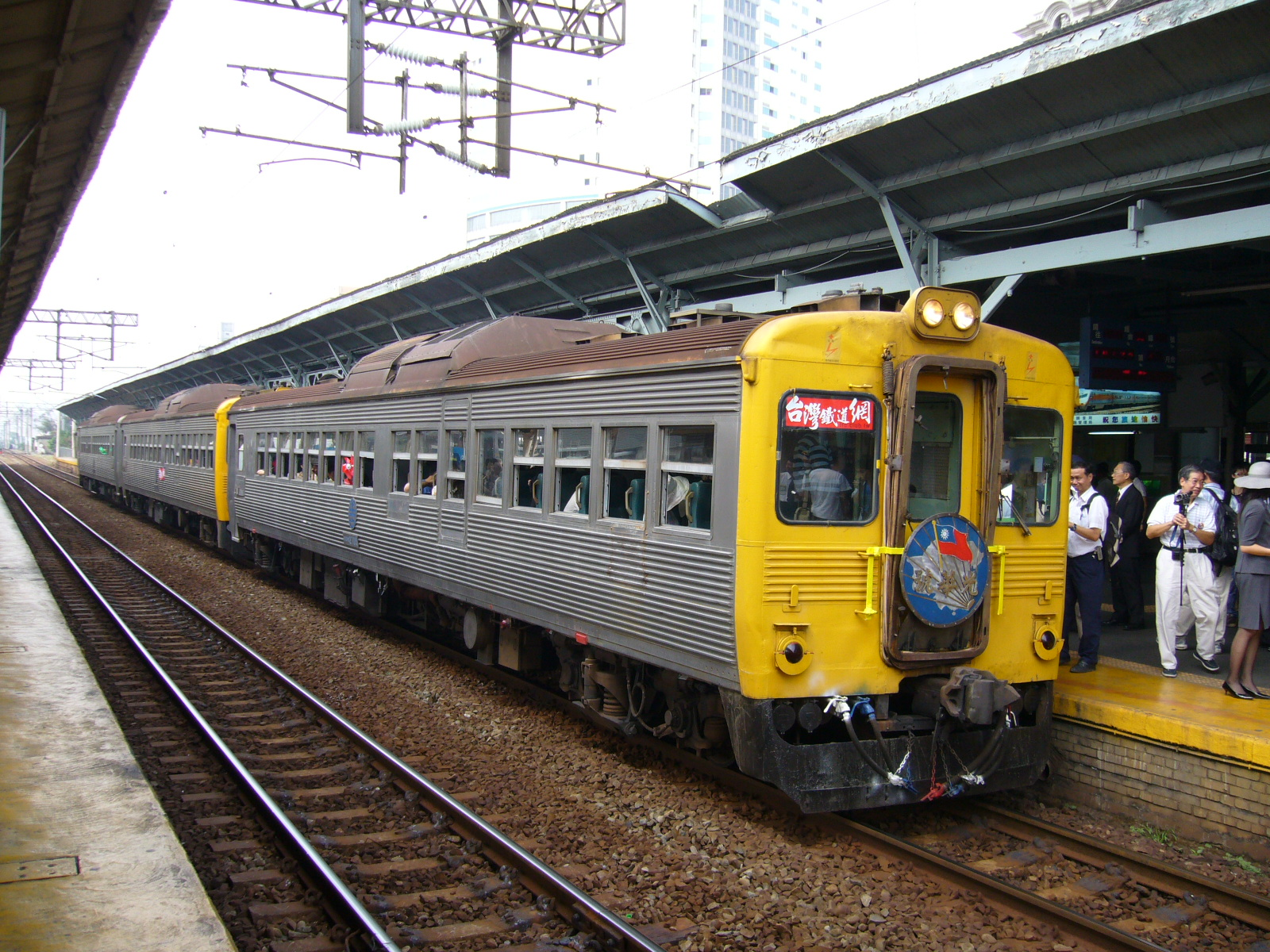
This is another recreation of the Glory of China Express using three preserved DR2700 units, stopping at Taichung station.

The DR2700 started public service on October 31, 1966, under the name of The Glory of China Express, and with its light body and a blazing 69 mph design speed, it still holds the pre-electrification record for the fastest time for traversing Taiwan's Western Line in its entirety, in a time of just four hours and 40 minutes, beating the previous Flying Formosan record by 20 minutes. It was a lot more comfortable and much faster than the steam locomotive services, which were the best available in 1956. The total number of power cars built was 25, along with 6 trailers, and they usually worked in a formation of 2 power cars, or two power cars with one trailer in the middle, since the power cars were the only ones equipped with driving cabs, and given the modest output of the engine, it was not possible for just the one power car to haul another trailer alone. The DR2700 series bodywork was based on the Budd Rail Diesel Car (RDC), since Tokyu Car Corporation at that time had a license from the Budd Company to incorporate its stainless steel train body and bogie technology from the latter, which it also did for the TRA DR2800 series built in the early-1980s.

The innovations introduced on this service included complementary refreshments and boxed lunches on the train, included free with the rail ticket. The service proved very popular with the rail users of the time, and indeed started a 'travelling by rail' culture in the Taiwan that lingers on today.

It was said that this train was introduced to celebrate the 80th birthday of Chiang Kai-shek, a Chinese military leader, and eventually the president of the Republic of China. The shining silver carriages were built with stainless steel, giving the nickname 'Baitee-ah', meaning "White Steel Train" in Southern Min language (Nowadays, this nickname is still used by railway enthusiasts and senior employees of the Taiwan Railway Administration). This batch of railcars was a worthwhile investment for the railway. By 1996, the DR2700 had given 30 years of impeccable service, and was still going strong in 1997. As a result, it acquired another nickname ~ 'The forever white steel train'.

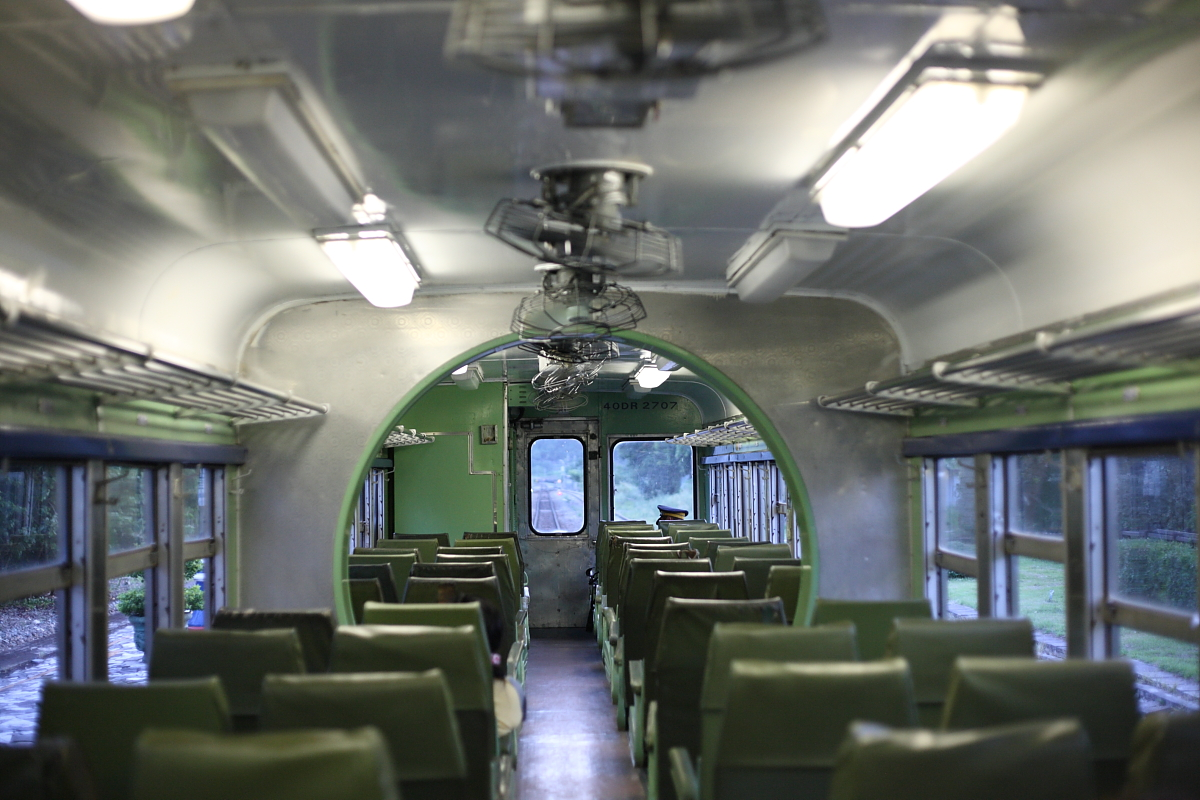
Interior view of a DR2700 (#DR2707) featuring fans and mid-car radiator ducts for the underfloor engine.

Since the electrification of the Western Line in Taiwan, the units were moved to operate on the northern section of the Eastern Line; in 1979, the southern section was still under construction. They were eventually stripped of their express status in 1986, after 20 years of service. Failures were becoming commonplace due to their age, and they were no longer considered suitable for long-distance services. The units are now used on branch lines in place of the DR2400 in order to provide a higher quality service. Before the arrival of the EMU400 and EMU500, they operated as peak-hour relief commuter services on the central coastal railway, under the branding of Diesel Express, which was timed slightly faster than the standard commuter service, and offered free seat reservations. One of the first branch lines to receive the DR2700, before they were eventually replaced by the EMU400, was the Neiwan Line, the longest branch line in the Taiwan, extending some 7 miles inland from Hsinchu, but relegation to branch line services didn't really start until 1997 when the EMU500 class commuter trains were phased in throughout the country.

The small fleet of six DR2750 trailers was withdrawn in 1997, following the introduction of the EMU500, in order to reduce the strain on the aged motor coaches. At a time when there was a shortage of hauled mainline rolling stock, it was suspected that these trailers would not be scrapped -as with most withdrawn units in Taiwan- and would be sent to Tang Eng Iron Works for conversion into 'new' rolling stock. Only one example, DR2752.

Two DR2700 vehicles have been converted to catenary maintenance vehicles and are still in use by TRA in work service. After their formal retirement on in July, 2014, DR2700 are no longer available in regular services. 8 vehicles are reserved for the use of special trains, but it was eventually withdrawn in 2020 due to the extensive corrosion of its body.

== Timeline ==
- October 22, 1966: initial test run between Taipei and Kaohsiung
- October 31, 1966: DR2700 type operated on the West Coast Line under the name of "Kuang Hwa" service.
- August 15, 1978: achieves pre-electrification speed record on the West Coast Line via Coast Line. With Southbound train No. 2003 scheduled for 5 hours and 8 minutes runtime from Taipei to Kaohsiung, and Northbound services scheduled for 5 hours and 10 mins.
- July 14, 1979: Last run on the West Coast Line due to completion of the West Coast Mainline Electrification project. The following day, vehicles were transferred to Yilan Line to serve on all-reserved limited express service between Suao and Taipei.
- July 15, 2014: Final regularly scheduled service using DR2700 series takes place on Hualien–Taitung Line between Yuli and Hualien.
