= Detroit Diesel 110 =

110

Overview
- Manufacturer: Detroit Diesel division of General Motors
- Production: 1945-1965

Layout
- Configuration: Straight-6 cylinder
- Displacement: 660 cu in (10.8 L)
- Cylinder bore: 5 in (127.0 mm)
- Piston stroke: 5.6 in (142.2 mm)
- Compression ratio: 18.0:1

Combustion
- Supercharger: Centrifugal-type or Roots-type
- Turbocharger: On later versions
- Fuel system: Unit fuel injection
- Fuel type: Diesel
- Oil system: Forced feed
- Cooling system: Water-cooled

Output
- Power output: 275–349 hp (205–260 kW)
- Torque output: 496–1,020 lb⋅ft (672–1,383 N⋅m)

Dimensions
- Dry weight: 4,000 lb (1,814 kg) (approx.)

The Detroit Diesel Series 110, with 110 cubic inches (1.8 L) displacement per cylinder, was introduced in 1945 as more-powerful alternative to the existing Series 71 engines. It was used in a variety of applications, including construction equipment, marine propulsion and power generation. The most popular use was in the Budd RDC self-powered rail car. It was also heavily used in Euclid construction machinery. In 1951 a marine version was also introduced.

== Overview ==
The Detroit Diesel Series 110 is a two-stroke diesel engine series, available in straight-6 cylinder configuration (in keeping with the standard Detroit Diesel practice at the time, engines were referred to using a concatenation of the number of cylinders and the displacement, so this was a model 6-110). It was introduced as the second mass-market product of the Detroit Diesel Engine Division of General Motors in 1945.

=== Design ===
Animation of two-stroke uniflow scavenging engine

The 6-110 series engines utilize uniflow scavenging, where a blower mounted to the exterior of the engine provides intake air through cored passages in the engine block and ports in the cylinder walls at slightly greater than atmospheric pressure. The engine exhausts through push-rod operated poppet valves in the cylinder head, with either two or four valves per cylinder. Unit fuel injection is employed, one injector per cylinder, with no high fuel pressure outside of the injector body. The injectors are cycled from the same camshaft responsible for opening the exhaust valves.

As a two stroke cycle Diesel engine cannot naturally aspirate, or draw in its own intake air, the blower is necessary to provide air in an amount sufficient both for scavenging of exhaust gasses from the cylinder and to support combustion.

Initial versions of the 6-110 engine used a centrifugal-type blower. This was very practical for fixed-speed applications such as marine or generator service, but proved a failure in automotive applications; because the blower was geared to spin approximately 10× engine speed, any overspeed condition would cause the impeller to come apart, sending debris into the engine. "The engine was developed on the dyno and was never operated above rated RPM. The first application was in Euclid mining trucks, where the driver's income depends on how fast he drives the empty truck back down into the pit. The centrifugal blower ran about 10 times engine speed. Exceeding that RPM was fatal, and in a truck a single missed downshift could mean a failed engine." For that reason a Roots type blower was made available as an option after about 1952. Later high performance versions were available with turbochargers.

=== Development ===
The initial Series 71 engines from Detroit Diesel were produced in inline 1-, 2-, 3-, 4- and 6-cylinder configurations. The most powerful version, the 6-71, displaced 426 cubic inches (7.0 L) in total (71 cu in (1.2 L) per cylinder) and produced 170 hp (127 kW) at 1800 rpm. While these engines with their low cost and relatively light weight were highly successful, there was also great demand for higher horsepower, especially for non-highway applications such as power generation and construction equipment.

Since inline engines of more than 6 cylinders tend to have substantial technical problems, and since GM was not to perfect V-block engine technology for another decade, they took two divergent approaches to achieving higher horsepower. One was to couple together multiple 6-71 engines in twin (side-by-side), tandem (fore-and-aft) and the quad (four 6-71s all driving a single shaft). While these did produce high horsepower and even added some redundancy, they were mechanically complex and relatively expensive.

The alternative approach was to design a new engine and increase the displacement per cylinder from the existing 71 to 110 cubic inches (1.2 to 1.8 L), or roughly a 50% increase. This resulted in the model 6-110, with 660 cubic inches (10.8 L) total displacement, which produced a continuous rating of 275 hp (205 kW) at 1800 rpm. While the basic engine components (block, crankshaft, pistons, etc.) were all new, many of the additional components (injectors, governors, accessories, marine gears) were simply shared with the Series 71 engines. Since the 6-110 was designed from the outset for heavy-duty high-horsepower applications, it was never produced in a four-cylinder version, as that would have displaced 440 cubic inches (7.2 L), very close to the 426 cubic inches (7.0 L) displaced by the 6-71.

The introduction of the V-71 series in 1957 effectively doomed the 6-110, as both the 8V-71 (568 cubic inches (9.3 L) displacement) and 12V-71 (852 cubic inches (14.0 L) displacement) offered higher horsepower in a more compact form factor. However the high torque and great reliability of the 6-110 was still valued for heavy-duty applications.

The Series 110 was last produced in 1965, after which the manufacturing rights were purchased by the W. W. Williams Distribution Company, which continues to provide parts for these engines.

== Specifications ==
The 6-110 was a remarkably flexible engine. The same basic block was available in both clockwise and counterclockwise rotation, and the exhaust manifold was also available on either the left or right side. A turbocharged model was on the market by 1958, boosting the power to 349 hp (260 kW) at 2000 RPM.

All 6-110 engines were designated a Unit Model Number 62200, with 62200 RA designating starboard rotation and 62200 LA designating port rotation.

Other specifications include:

Description	Specification
Bore	5 in (127.0 mm)
Stroke	5.6 in (142.2 mm)
Piston Speed @ 1800 rpm	1,680 ft/min (510 m/min)
Piston Speed @ 1600 rpm	1,490 ft/min (450 m/min)
Compression Ratio	18.0:1
Lubrication	Forced feed
Heat absorbed by engine cooling water	35 BTU/HP/Min (82%)
Air required for scavenging and combustion at 1800 RPM	1,100 cu ft/min (31 m^{3}/min)
Maximum angle of installation	16 degrees
Maximum exhaust backpressure	4 inches of mercury (14 kPa)
Capacity antifreeze cooling system	12 US gallons (45 L; 10.0 imp gal)
Engine lube oil capacity (including filters)	8 US gallons (30 L; 6.7 imp gal)
Marine reduction gear oil capacity	8 1/2 US qt (8.0 L; 7.1 imp qt)
Approximate weight including reduction gear	4,000 lb (1,814 kg)

== Advertising ==
Quoting from an introductory ad (Yachting Magazine, January 1951):

"Here's the newest member of the General Motors Diesel family - the brawny 6-110 engine that develops 275 hp (205 kW). It is 50% more powerful than the famous 6-cylinder GM "71" engine that powers so many of America's fine yachts, tugs and fishing vessels -- yet it weighs less than 15 lb (6.8 kg) per horsepower, including the famous GM hydraulic reverse gear."

Quoting from an introductory article (Motor Boating Magazine, August 1950):

"A new compact, light weight Diesel engine, now being manufactured by Detroit Diesel Engine Division of General Motors, promises the economy and efficiency of Diesel power in scores of applications where such power could not be used before because of size and weight. The new engine, designated the "110" because of its 110 cubic inches (1.8 L) displacement per cylinder, is a 6-cylinder, 2-cycle unit rated at 275 hp (205 kW). The engine has undergone extensive testing in U. S. Coast Guard vessels.

"The new 110 engine embodies the same advanced principles of high-speed, two-cycle design as the 71 series, of which more than 45,000,000 horsepower have been produced by Detroit Diesel since 1937. The horsepower rating of 275 hp (205 kW) at 1800 r.p.m. is attained with a b.m.e.p. of 92 lb (42 kg) per square inch. Bore is 5 in (130 mm) and stroke, 5.6 in (140 mm). Features include blower scavenging with a new and highly efficient gear-driven centrifugal blower furnishing considerably more air for the cylinders than is needed for combustion. GM unit injectors (one for each cylinder) pump, meter and atomize the fuel, and are easily removed for inspection or exchange. Cylinder block and head are one-piece castings, both being symmetrical about a vertical plane between the No. 3 and 4 cylinders. This symmetry allows the cylinder head and block to be reversed, giving a choice of rotational directions and making possible a variety of accessory locations to suit installation requirements.

"The engine is of rugged heavy-duty construction throughout. All wearing parts such as cylinder liners, bearings, valve guides and inserts are precision parts and are readily replaceable, which adds to engine life and ease of repair. Large main bearing and crankpin journals assure long bearing life."
