= Prospector (Denver and Rio Grande Western Railroad train) =

Passenger train of the Denver & Rio Grande Western railroad

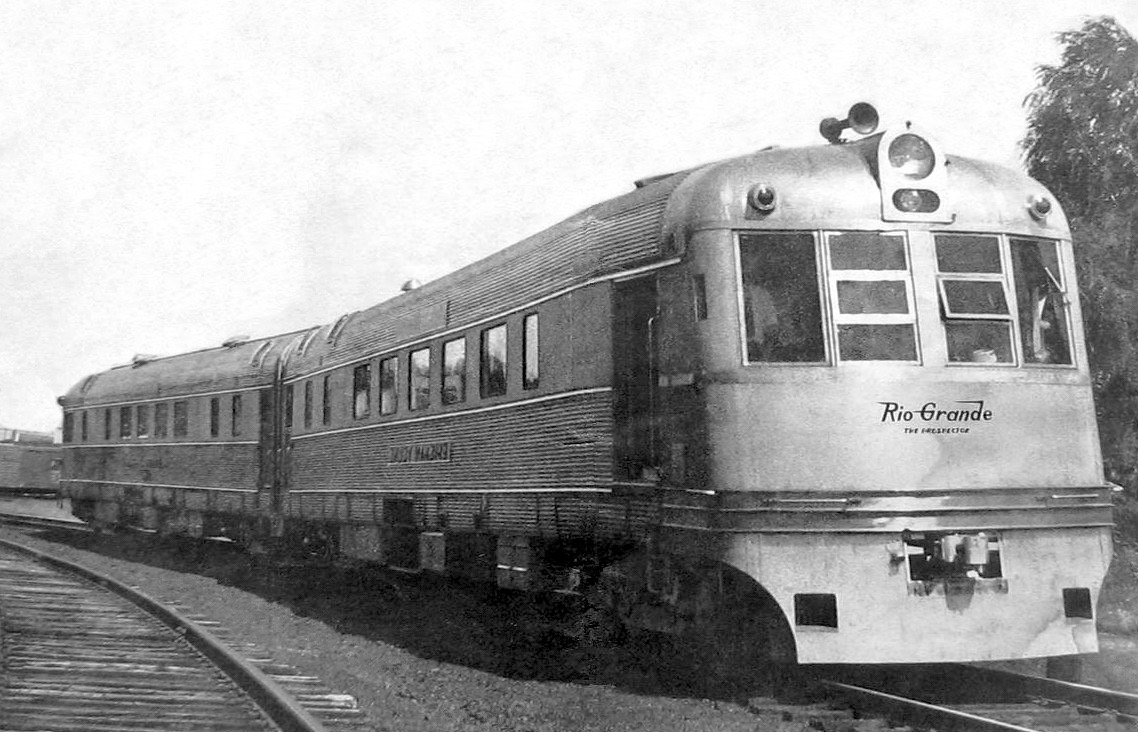
- One of the Budd-built trainsets in 1941

Overview
- Service type: Inter-city rail
- Status: Discontinued
- Locale: Western United States
- First service: November 17, 1941; October 1, 1945
- Last service: July 5, 1942; May 28, 1967
- Former operator: Denver and Rio Grande Western Railroad

Route
- Termini: Denver, Colorado; Salt Lake City, Utah

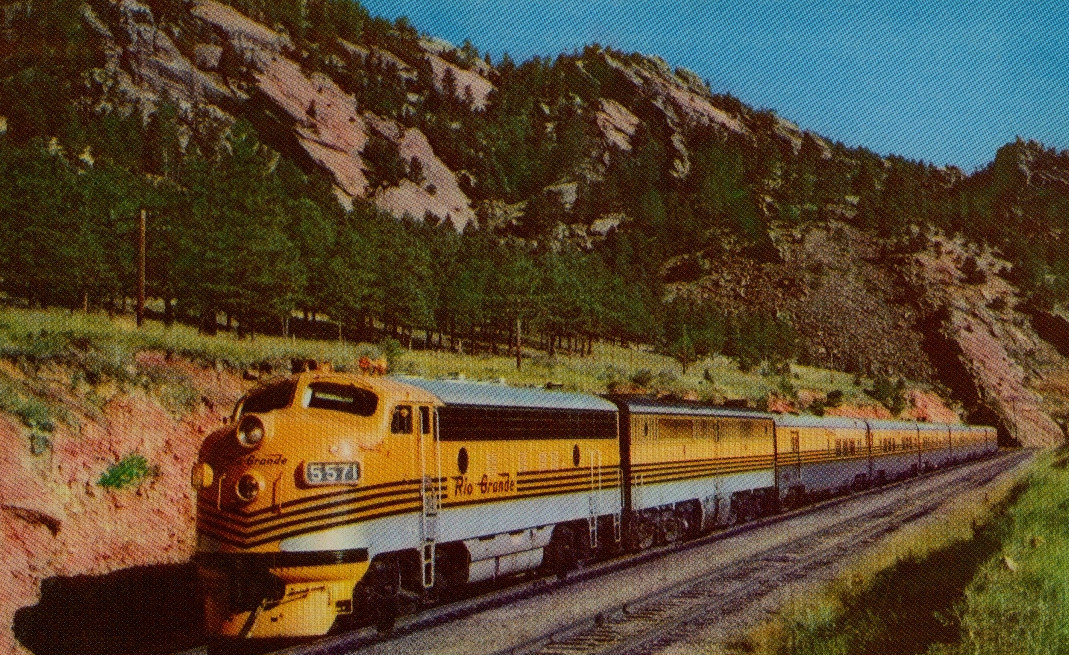
Postcard photo of the postwar train.

The Prospector was a passenger train operated by the Denver & Rio Grande Western railroad between Denver, Colorado and Salt Lake City, Utah. There were two incarnations of the train: a streamlined, diesel multiple unit train that operated briefly in 1941 and 1942; and a locomotive-hauled train of conventional passenger equipment that operated from 1945 until 1967.

== 1941–1942 Prospector ==
The train was inaugurated November 17, 1941. The original equipment was a pair of Budd Company-built diesel multiple units numbered M-1 and M-2.

For the inaugural trip in 1941, the railroad made stainless steel pass holders that were intended to be distributed to passengers. The holder was engraved with a line drawing of the train on the outside. On the inside were two cards: one with an embossed picture of a prospector and mule in gold, the other with a message reading:

"Denver & Rio Grande Western Railroad is honored to welcome _____ on the inaugural trip of the Prospector. New, diesel power, stainless steel streamlined train designed for overnight every night service between Denver and Salt Lake City."

The holders were not distributed as intended to passengers.

The trainsets had significant reliability problems exacerbated by difficult terrain and the train was discontinued July 5, 1942. The trainsets were returned to Budd and ultimately scrapped.

== The Postwar Prospector ==
Anticipating increases in overnight Denver-Salt Lake City rail passenger traffic after the end of World War II, the Rio Grande restored the Prospector on October 1, 1945, using conventional heavyweight equipment. The railroad also began planning the acquisition of new lightweight equipment for the train. In 1949 it purchased three dome-observation cars built by Budd, and in 1950 it took delivery of 25 Pullman-Standard cars — equipment that had been ordered by the Chesapeake and Ohio Railway, but never used by that railroad. The Pullman-Standard cars began service on the Prospector in late 1950, whereas the Budd dome cars generally served on the Royal Gorge (see below) and therefore only appeared on the Prospector west of Grand Junction, Colorado.

In response to a coal miners' strike, in 1950 the Rio Grande began combining the Prospector and the railroad's Royal Gorge train west of Grand Junction. This combined operation continued until 1964 when Royal Gorge service was cut back to Salida, Colorado. Between 1950 and 1953 the train's western terminus was extended from Salt Lake City to Ogden.

Between 1964 and 1967 the railroad occasionally attached flatcars carrying highway vans —piggyback cars — to the rear of the Prospector, a relatively rare combination of passenger and freight service in the same train.

The Prospector made its final runs on May 28, 1967.
