= Taipei Metro VAL256 =

Rolling stock used for Taipei Metro

VAL 256
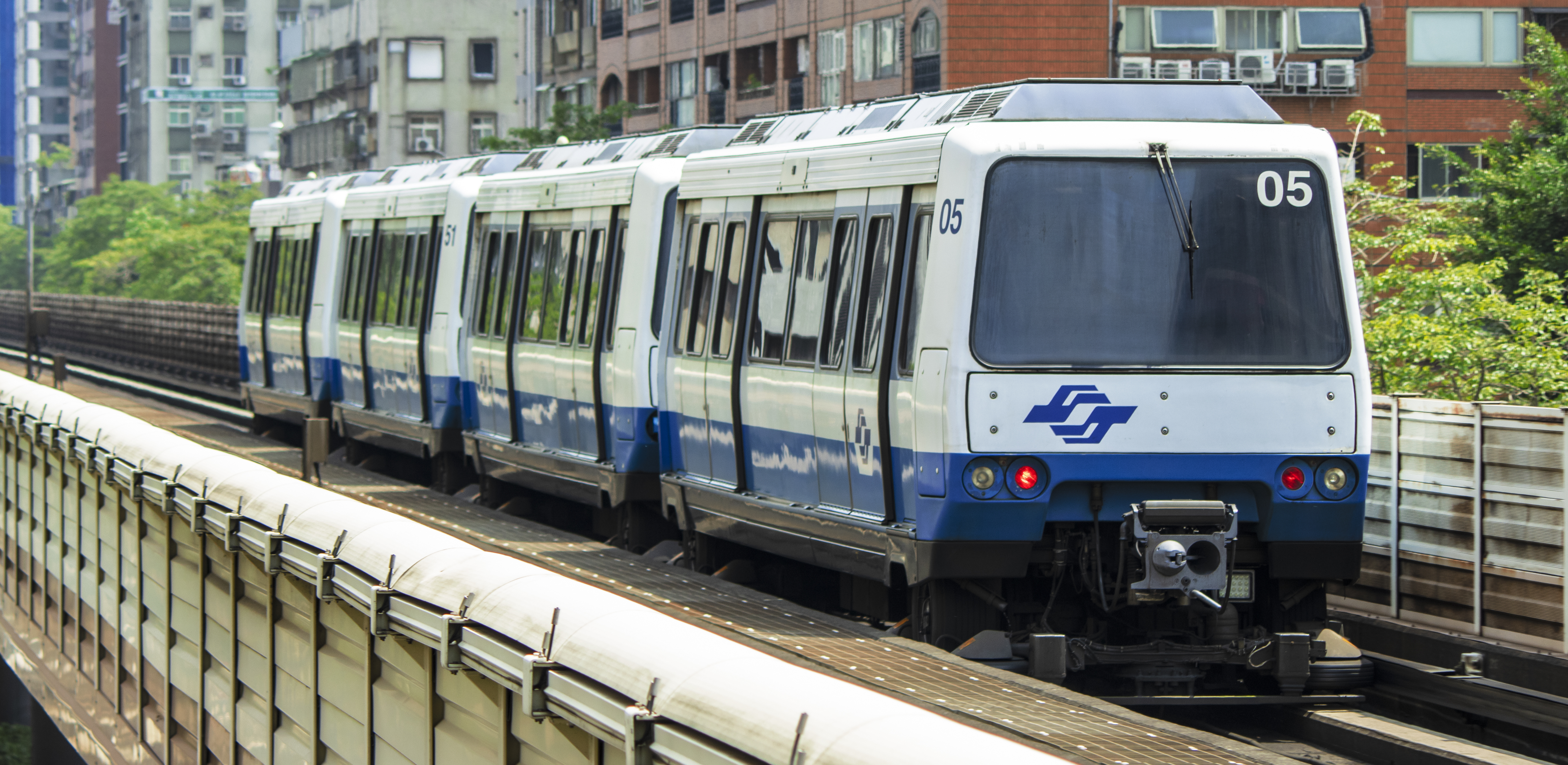
- A VAL 256 train leaving Daan station, May 2021

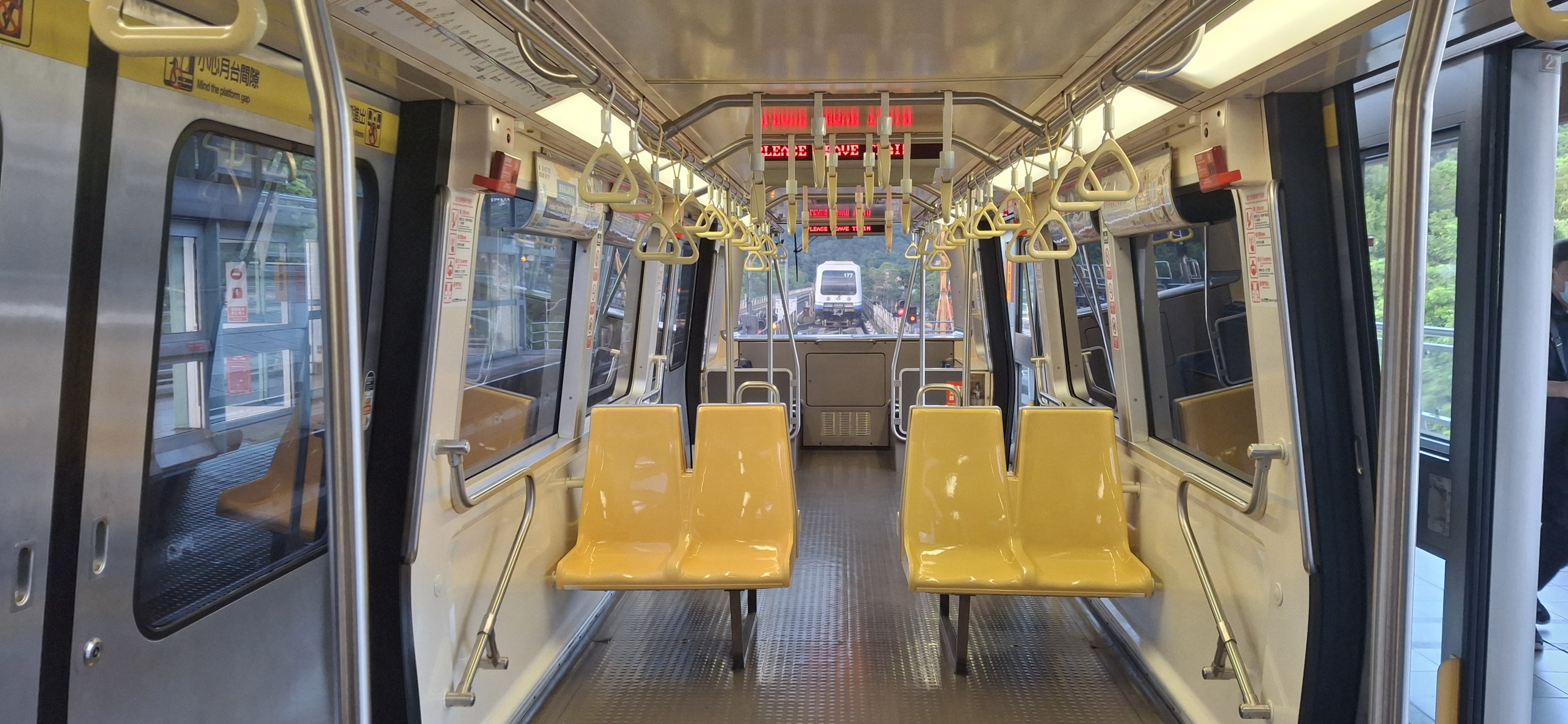
- Interior of the VAL 256 train
- In service: 1996–present (Taipei); 1993–2018 (Chicago); 1985–1989 (Jacksonville)
- Manufacturers: Matra, GEC Alsthom
- Family name: VAL
- Constructed: 1985–1993
- Entered service: 28 March 1996
- Scrapped: 2018 (Chicago)
- Number built: 117 carriages
- Number in service: 102 carriages (51 units)
- Number scrapped: 15 carriages (Chicago)
- Successor: Innovia APM 256 (Chicago)
- Formation: 2 cars per unit, 2 units per train (Taipei); Single unit, max of 3 cars per unit (Chicago); Single car per train (Jacksonville)
- Fleet numbers: 01–51 (Taipei); 01–15 (Chicago/Jacksonville)
- Capacity: 114 (20 seated, 94 standing) per car
- Operator: Taipei Rapid Transit Corporation
- Depots: Muzha, Neihu
- Line served: Wenhu line

Specifications
- Car body construction: Stainless steel
- Car length: 13.78 m (45.2 ft)
- Width: 2.56 m (8 ft 5 in)
- Height: 3.53 m (11.6 ft)
- Doors: 4 total, 2 on either sides
- Maximum speed: 80 km/h (50 mph) (design); 70 km/h (43 mph) (service)
- Traction system: GEC Alsthom armature GTO chopper control
- Acceleration: 1.3 m/s^{2} (4.3 ft/s^{2})
- Electric systems: 750 V DC third rail
- Current collection: Contact shoe
- AAR wheel arrangement: Taipei: A-A+A-A; Chicago: A-A
- Safety system: Moving block Bombardier CITYFLO 650 CBTC–ATC under ATO GoA 4 (UTO)
- Coupling system: Scharfenberg
- Track gauge: 1,880 mm (6 ft 2 in)

The Taipei Metro VAL 256 is the first generation of automated guideway transit rolling stock to be used on the Wenhu (Brown) line of Taipei Metro.

A total of 51 2-car train sets were built by GEC Alsthom from 1989 to 1993, for a total of 102 cars. They entered service in 1996 as the first trains on the newly opened Metro system. They are part of the VAL family of automated, driverless rubber-tired metros developed by the French company Matra. Each four-car train is formed by two coupled two-car trainsets. Any two sets can be coupled and their numbers do not need to be consecutive, unlike heavy-capacity trains.

Within a year of revenue operations, Matra terminated the service contract, removing all maintenance crew. They filed and won a complaint against the Taipei City Government over contract compensation delay. The VAL 256 trains remained in service for twelve more years, serviced by TRTC engineers and Academia Sinica researchers.

The VAL 256 cars originally employed a fixed-block ATC/ATO system derived from the MAGGALY technology found on Lyon Metro Line D. When the Muzha/Wenshan line was extended into Neihu in June 2003, Bombardier Transportation was contracted to replace the Matra-based system with its own, computerized, moving block CITYFLO 650 CBTC system, and overhauling the older Matra cars to function under the new system. This took place over a period of 17 months and all 51 sets returned to service in December 2010.

Bombardier's contract also involved supplying 101 newly built vehicles to expand the existing fleet. Integration of the Bombardier-built cars with the Matra-built cars led to multiple system malfunctions and failures along the Wenshan and Neihu Lines.

The VAL 256 cars were also used by O'Hare International Airport's Airport Transit System, albeit with the majority of the seats removed since the system's primary purpose is to move passengers between terminals as well as provide access to the economy parking lots, rental car facility, and the Metra station until it was replaced in 2021. However, as of 2026, Taipei metro decides to replace the aging VAL256 in the future.

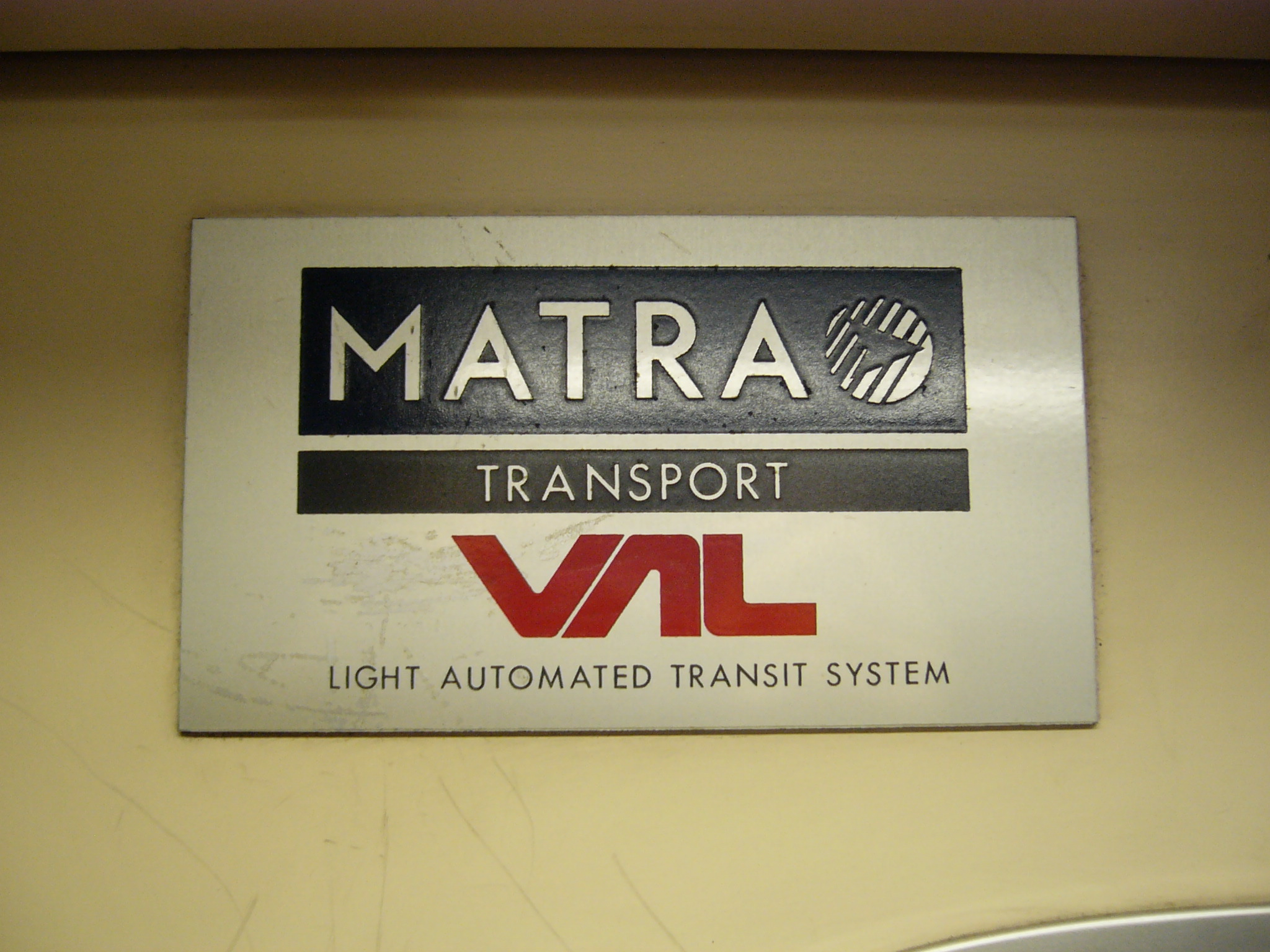
Matra manufacturer's plate

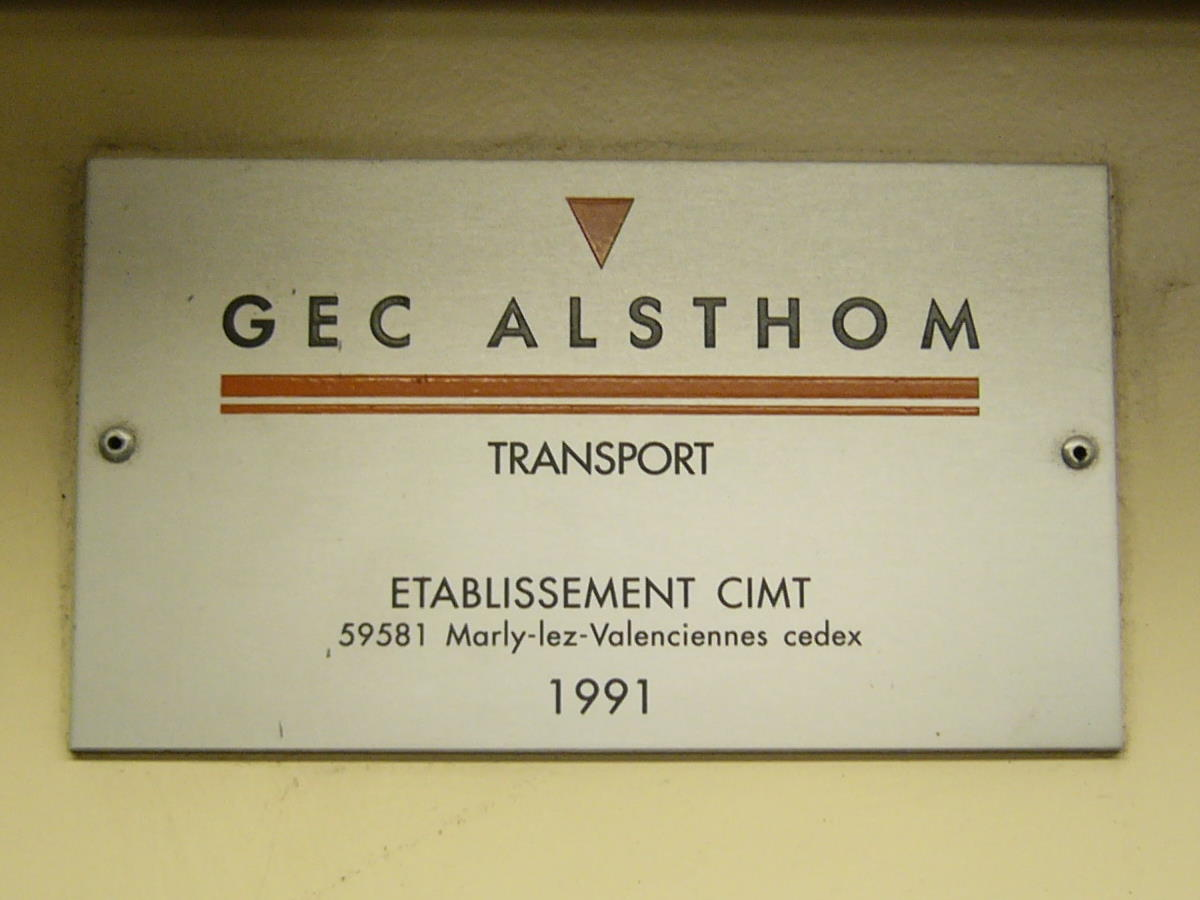
GEC Alsthom manufacturer's plate

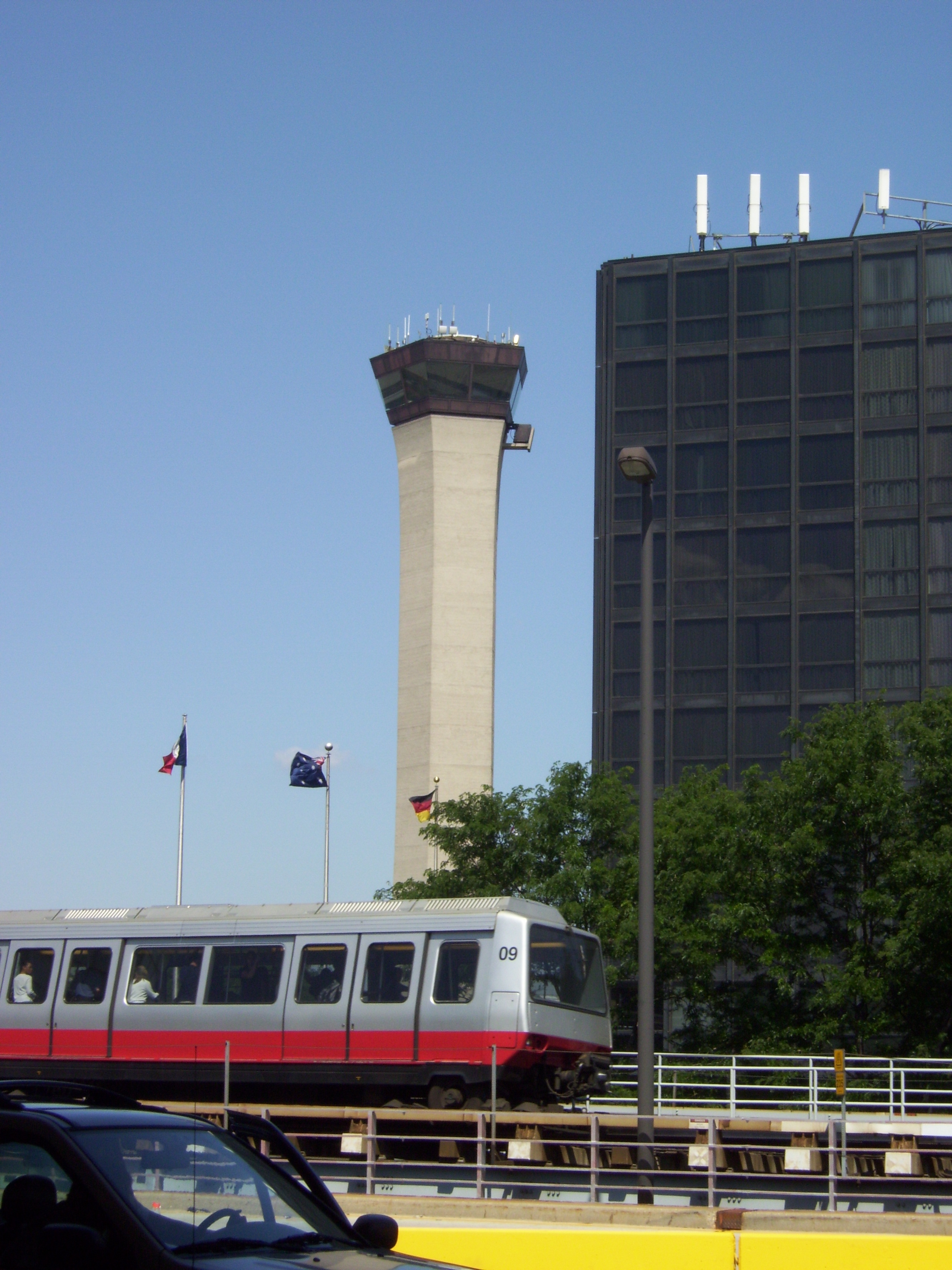
VAL 256s on O'Hare International Airport's Airport Transit System

== See also ==
- List of driverless trains
- Taipei Metro C301
- Taipei Metro C321
- Taipei Metro C341
- Taipei Metro C371
- Taipei Metro BT370
- Taipei Metro C381
