= Siemens Modular Metro (Kaohsiung) =

Trains of Kaohsiung Metro

Kaohsiung Metro high-capacity EMU
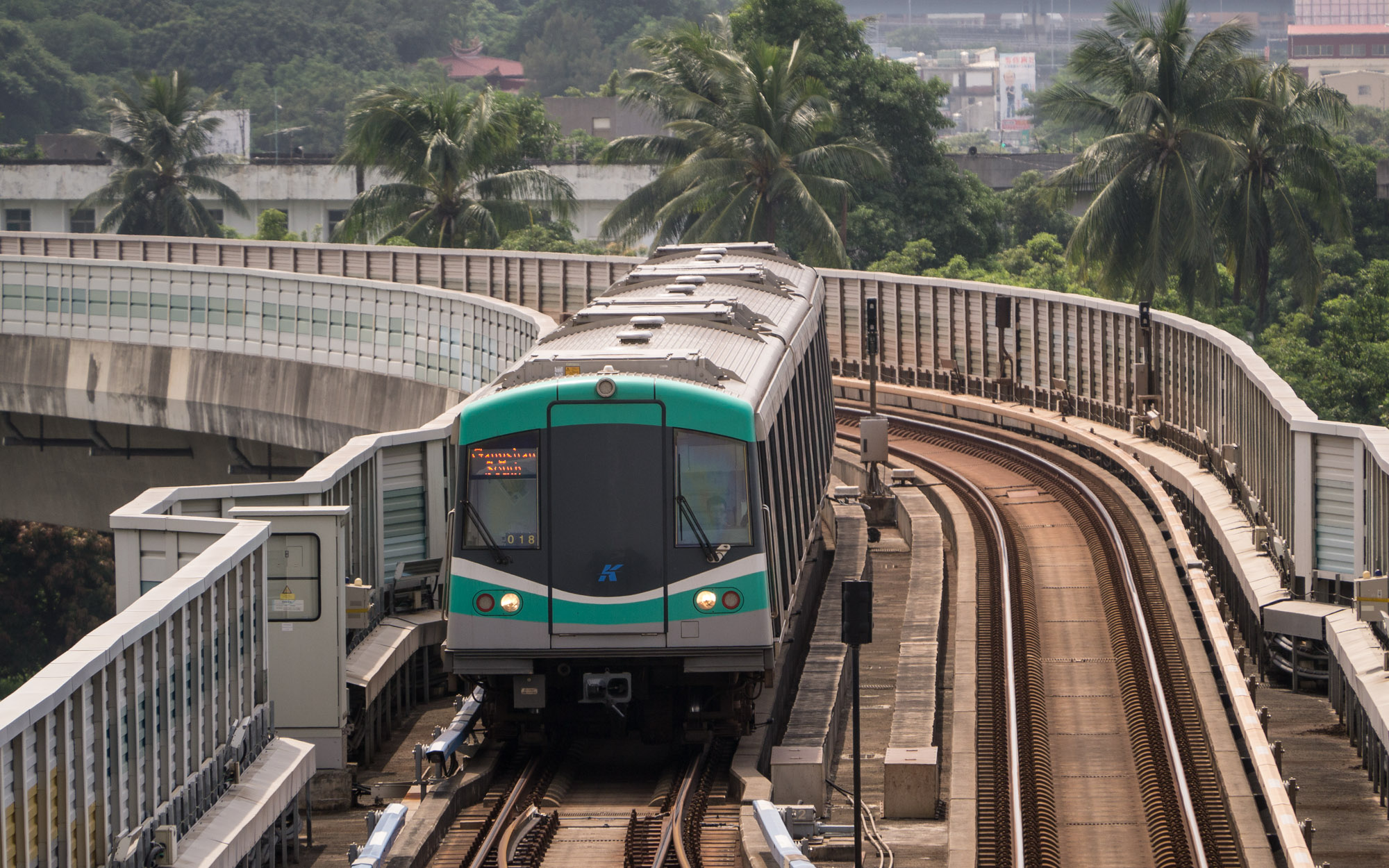
- A Kaohsiung Metro train outside World Games, 2014

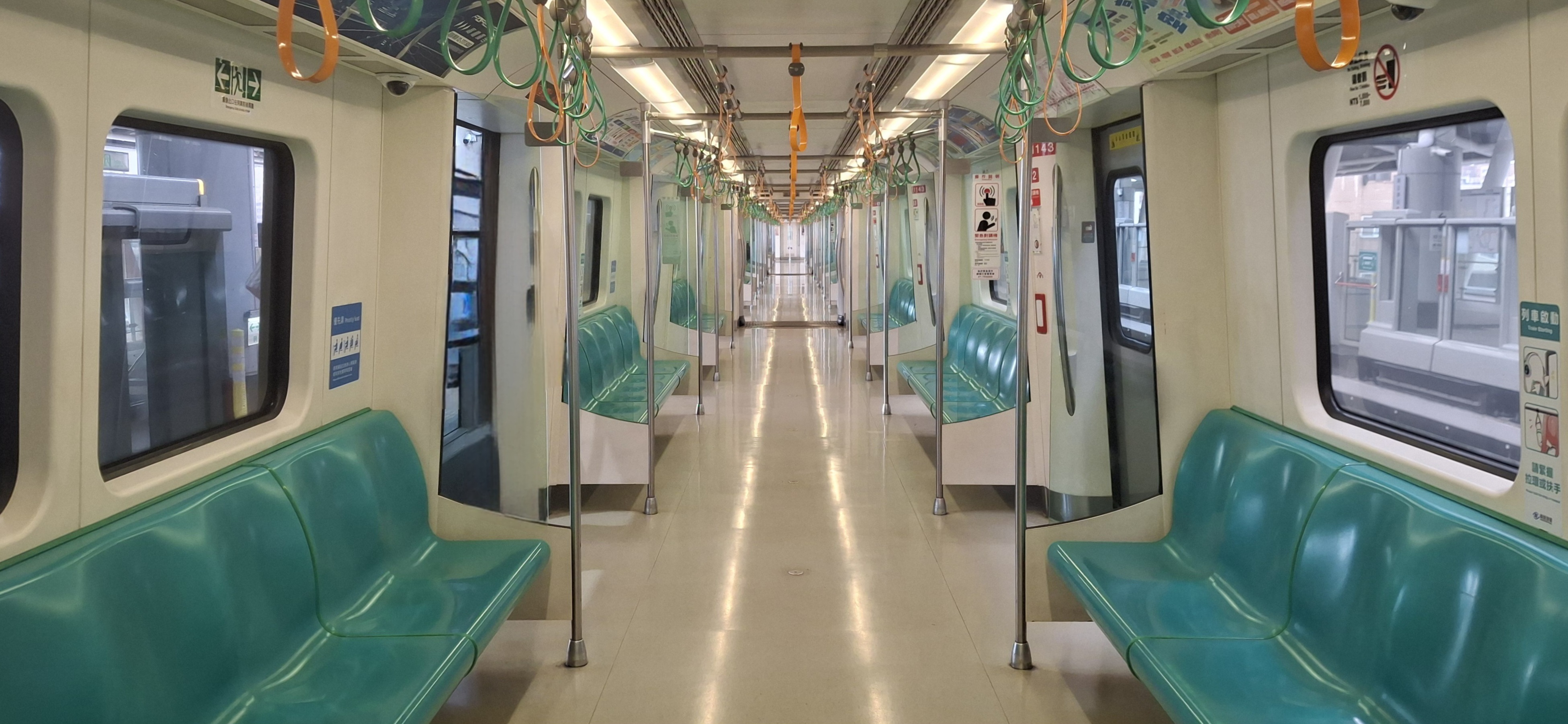
- Interior design of the Kaohsiung Metro train
- In service: 2008–present
- Manufacturer: Siemens
- Built at: Vienna, Austria
- Family name: Modular Metro
- Constructed: 2005–2006
- Entered service: 9 March 2008
- Number under construction: 126 vehicles
- Number built: 126 vehicles (42 sets)
- Number in service: 126 vehicles (42 sets)
- Formation: 3-car sets; DM1–T–DM2
- Fleet numbers: 101/102–183/184
- Capacity: 755 (126 seated, 629 standing) at 5 pass./m^{2}
- Operator: Kaohsiung Rapid Transit Corporation
- Depots: North, South, Daliao
- Lines served: Red Line; Orange Line

Specifications
- Car body construction: Stainless steel
- Train length: 65.45 m (214 ft 9 in) (3-car sets)
- Car length: 21,945 mm (72 ft 0 in) (DM); 21.56 m (70 ft 9 in) (T)
- Width: 3.15 m (10 ft 4 in)
- Height: 3.75 m (12 ft 4 in)
- Floor height: 1.13 m (3 ft 8 in)
- Wheel diameter: 850–770 mm (33–30 in) (new–worn)
- Wheelbase: 2.3 m (7 ft 7 in)
- Maximum speed: 90 km/h (56 mph) (design); 80 km/h (50 mph) (service)
- Weight: 117.3 t (115.4 long tons; 129.3 short tons) (empty); 177.6 t (174.8 long tons; 195.8 short tons) (empty)
- Axle load: 16.1 t (15.8 long tons; 17.7 short tons)
- Steep gradient: 3%
- Traction system: Siemens G750 D580/600 M5-1 2-level IGBT–VVVF
- Traction motors: 4 × Siemens 1TB2010-1GA02 190 kW (250 hp) 3-phase AC induction motor
- Power output: 1.52 MW (2,040 hp) (3-car sets)
- Acceleration: 1 m/s^{2} (3.3 ft/s^{2})
- Deceleration: 1 m/s^{2} (3.3 ft/s^{2}) (service); 1.3 m/s^{2} (4.3 ft/s^{2}) (emergency)
- Electric systems: 750 V DC third rail
- Current collection: Contact shoe
- UIC classification: Bo′Bo′+2′2′+Bo′Bo′
- Bogies: SF 3000
- Braking systems: Regenerative and disc brakes
- Safety systems: ATC/ATO, ATS
- Coupling system: Scharfenberg
- Track gauge: 1,435 mm (4 ft 8 1/2 in) standard gauge

Notes/references
- Sourced from except were noted.

The Kaohsiung Metro Siemens Modular Metro (Mo.Mo) electric multiple unit (EMU) trains has operated on the heavy-rail Red and Orange Lines since its opening in 2008.

== History ==
In October 2001, Siemens Transportation Systems (now Siemens Mobility) was awarded a turnkey contract worth NT$17 billion to supply various subsystems for the Kaohsiung Metro project, including the signalling, power supply, trackwork, electromechanical systems and rolling stock. As a turnkey project fully supplied by Siemens, the initial system testing, integration and verification for the Kaohsiung Metro could be completed in a much shorter time and more easily as compared with the Taipei Metro and Taiwan High Speed Rail, which use mixed subsystems from multiple suppliers.

The first units were completed by the SGP plant in Austria in May 2005. After a series of dynamic and static test runs at Siemens' own railway test centre in October 2005, pairs of 6 train cars were transported by rail in batches to the Port of Hamburg. By 22 May 2007, the last batch of vehicles had arrived at the Port of Kaohsiung. The trains were subject to various test runs on the Metro lines to ensure that they would be able to meet the requirements of the Kaohsiung Metro route, and began service in March 2008.

== Overview ==
Much like the Taipei Metro trains, the Kaohsiung Metro trains are built to the 1,435 mm (4 ft 8 1/2 in) standard gauge, draws 750 V DC power from a bottom contact third rail and can operate up to a speed of 80 km/h (50 mph). Under normal conditions, the trains are operated by an automatic train operation (ATO) system and is monitored by the Centralised Traffic Control (CTC) system, permitting for a Grade of Automation (GoA) 2 for semi-automated operations. At a dimension of 21.9 m (71 ft 10 in) in length, 3.15 m (10 ft 4 in) in width and 3.75 m (12 ft 4 in) in height, the train is generally smaller than its Taipei counterparts.

The carbody was assembled using a fully automated production line by Siemens, with stainless steel being used to withstand the subtropical humid climate of the island, allowing for a service life of up to 30 years. The front cab of the DM cars were made using fiber-reinforced plastic (FRP) to allow for easy modelling of the front. The train doors are externally slung not unlike the Taipei Metro rolling stock, are electrically motored, and have an obstacle detection system. The train is also fitted with a LED display on the front cab to display the route information but not on the sides. The trains are also designed to be compliant to NFPA 130 standards

Much like the Taipei Metro trains, the Kaohsiung Metro rolling stock features an outward folding ramp as a detrainment device.

The train management system (TMS) adopts a computer screen human-machine interface, allowing the driver to monitor the operation status of important train components at any time and take appropriate actions to ensure safety.

Livery-wise, Siemens originally intended for the colour red but was changed to green after the Kaohsiung City Government and Rapid Transit Corporation suggested the theme of oceans given the port city status of Kaohsiung. Incidentally, the colours adopted by the political movements in Taiwan (Generally, the Pan-Green Coalition's traditional strongholds in southern Taiwan include Kaohsiung whereas support for the Pan-Blue Coalition is concentrated in the northern areas such as Taipei) coincide with the blue colours of the Taipei Metro and the green of Kaohsiung Metro.

== Interior Design ==
Interior-wise, the Kaohsiung Metro trains adopt green and white colours. Seats are made of FRP, are green in colour, and are longitudinally arranged instead of the transverse arrangement of its Taipei counterparts. Rubber handstraps are used instead of the triangular plastic grab handles of the Taipei Metro, allowing for flexibility. Triplicated vertical stanchion poles are also provided at the centre column. Air-conditioning outlets are positioned to be parallel to the lighting.

Much like the Taipei Metro trains and other contemporary metro trains worldwide, open gangway connection is provided and passengers can freely move between the different cars within a trainset.

The Kaohsiung Metro trains adopts an LED display system above the train doors alongside the regular route map of the Red and Orange Lines, with the former functioning very similarly to that in Taipei. Fully automated announcements are also provided for the next station and station arrival, as well as transfer information and the side from which doors will open.

The safety facilities provided on board the trains include fire extinguishers, emergency intercoms and an emergency detrainment ramp. The fire extinguisher is placed in the concealed storage slot of the equipment box at both ends of the carriage. In case of emergency, the acrylic plate can be removed and used. The emergency intercom is located on the left side of each pair of doors, and one can talk to the driver after pressing it.

== Deployments ==
The trains can be used on both the Red and Orange Lines as the two lines share the same electromechanical systems.

== Train formation ==
A complete three-car trainset consists of one driving motor car (DM1), one trailer car (T) and another driving motor car (DM2) coupled together. The configuration of a heavy-capacity Siemens trainset in revenue service is DM1–T–DM2.

Each car is assigned its own four-digit serial number, which ranges from x101 to x184.

- The first digit (the "x" above) indicates the position of the car, with DM cars use the number 1 and T cars number 2
- The other three digits are the identification number of the train the car is part of. A full-length train of three cars consists of two identification numbers, an odd number for the first two cars, and an even number for the last one. The bigger number is always equal to the smaller number plus one, and the smaller number is always an odd number. For example, a train of three cars would have serial numbers 1101, 2101, and 1102, respectively.
- In the future, the trains are set to be increased from 3 cars to 6 cars, with a configuration of DM1–T–M1–M2–T–DM2. Such a train would for example have serial numbers 1101, 2101, 3101, 3102, 2102, and 1102 respectively.

== See also ==
- Taipei Metro C321 and C341 - Two Taipei Metro train types also built by Siemens.
