= Taipei Metro C381 =

Rolling stock used for Taipei Metro

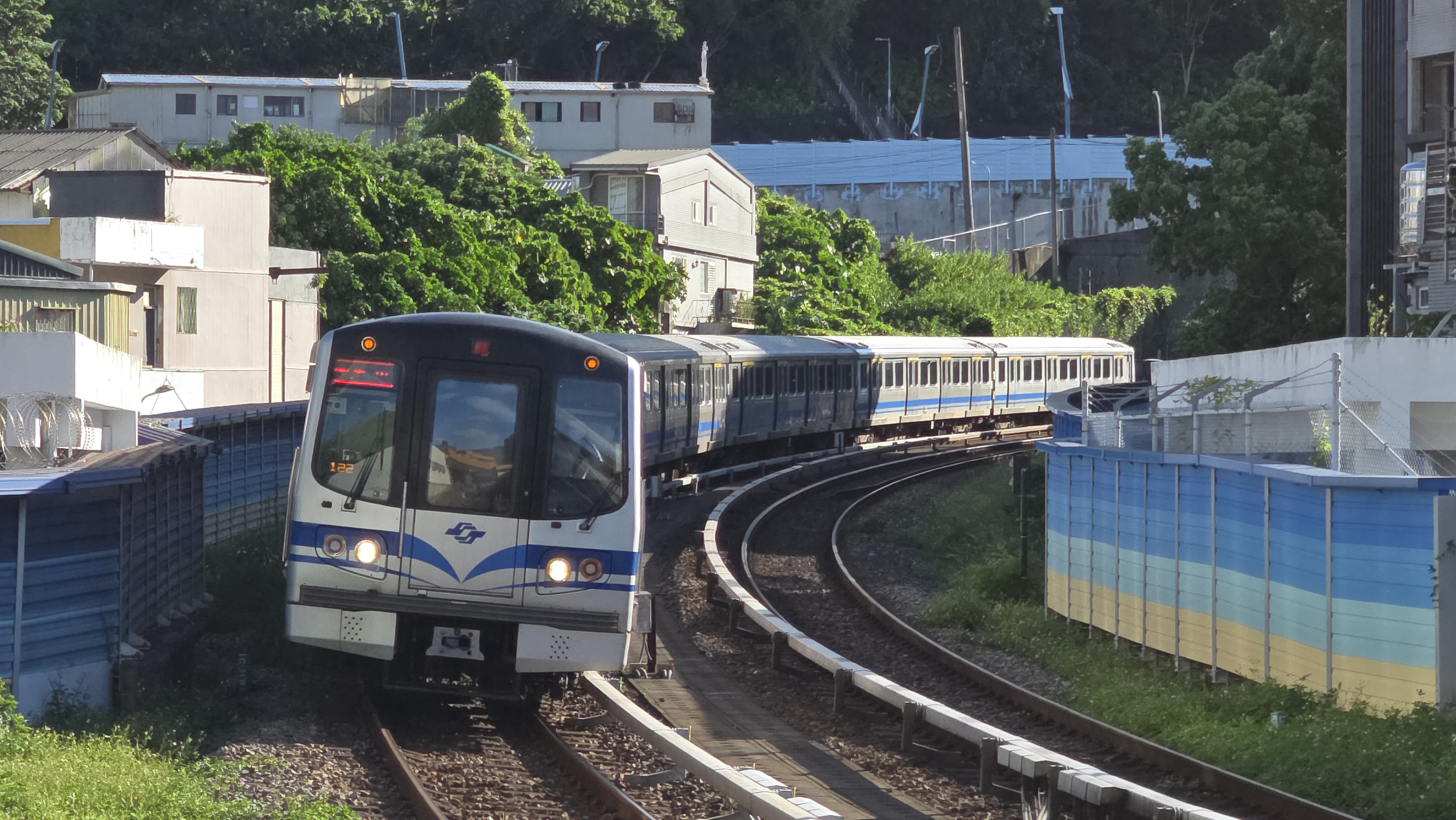
- A southbound C381 train approaching Guandu

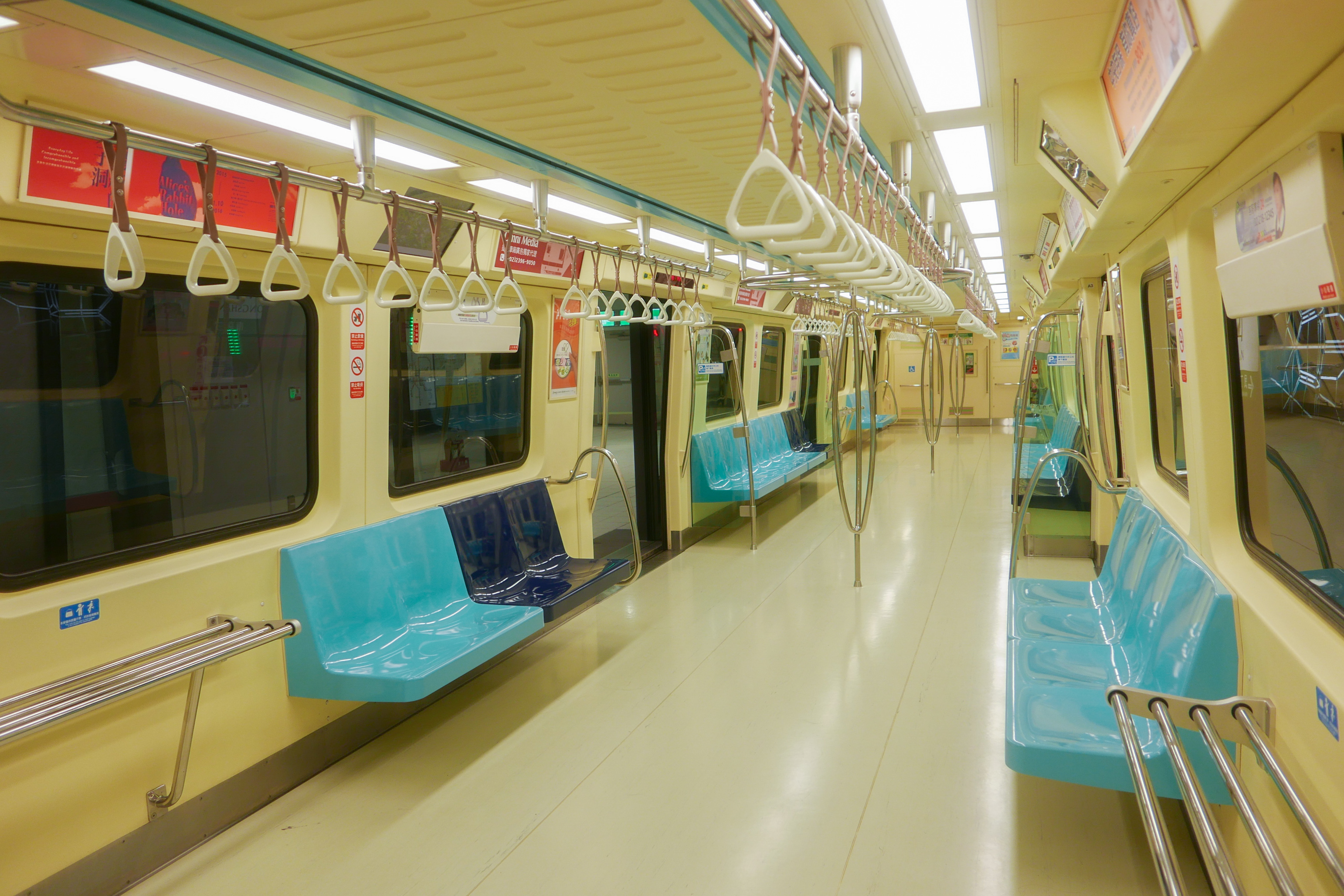
- Interior of C381
- In service: 2012–present
- Manufacturers: Kawasaki Heavy Industries and Taiwan Rolling Stock Company
- Built at: Kobe, Hyōgo, Japan (Kawasaki) and Hsinchu, Taiwan (TRSC)
- Constructed: 2010–2013
- Entered service: 7 October 2012
- Number built: 144 cars (24 sets)
- Formation: 6-car sets DM1–T–M2+M2–T–DM1
- Fleet numbers: 501/502–547/548
- Capacity: 1914 passengers
- Operator: Taipei Rapid Transit Corporation
- Depots: Xindian, Beitou, Tucheng
- Lines served: Tamsui–Xinyi Line; Songshan–Xindian Line; Bannan Line

Specifications
- Car body construction: 301L stainless steel
- Train length: 141.42 m (464 ft 0 in)
- Car length: 23.71 m (77 ft 9 in) (DM1); 23.5 m (77 ft 1 in) (T/M2)
- Width: 3.18 m (10 ft 5 in)
- Height: 3,585 mm (11 ft 9.1 in)
- Wheel diameter: 850–775 mm (33.5–30.5 in) (new–worn)
- Maximum speed: 90 km/h (56 mph) (design); 80 km/h (50 mph) (service)
- Weight: 40.1 t (39.5 long tons; 44.2 short tons) (DM1); 34.8 t (34.3 long tons; 38.4 short tons) (T); 39.2 t (38.6 long tons; 43.2 short tons) (M2)
- Traction system: Mitsubishi Electric MAP-184-75VD139A 2-level IGBT–VVVF
- Traction motors: 4 × Mitsubishi MB-5113-A2 175 kW (235 hp) 3-phase AC induction motor
- Power output: 2.8 MW (3,800 hp)
- Acceleration: 1 m/s^{2} (3.3 ft/s^{2})
- Deceleration: 1 m/s^{2} (2.2 mph/s) (service); 1.3 m/s^{2} (2.9 mph/s) (emergency)
- Electric systems: 750 V DC third rail
- Current collection: Contact shoe
- UIC classification: Bo′Bo′+2′2′+Bo′Bo′+Bo′Bo′+2′2′+Bo′Bo′
- Bogies: Kawasaki KW-186
- Braking systems: Dynamic braking, friction braking and idling/slip-off prevention
- Safety system: Alstom MicroCabmatic ATC/ATO with subsystem of ATS
- Coupling system: Tomlinson
- Track gauge: 1,435 mm (4 ft 8 1/2 in) standard gauge

The Taipei Metro C381 is the fifth and the latest generation of heavy-capacity electric multiple unit trains on the Taipei Metro in Taipei, Taiwan. A total of 144 train cars were jointly built by Kawasaki Heavy Industries and the Taiwan Rolling Stock Company, and began operation in 2012. They are currently in service on Tamsui–Xinyi line, Songshan–Xindian line and Bannan Line

== Overview ==
Each train car forms a six-car set made out of stainless steel with four doors on each side. The trains run on 750V DC power supplied from a third rail. More than 50% of the parts of the C381 are identical to that of the C371; such parts include cab equipment, electromechanical systems, passenger service interfaces, detrainment doors, etc. Hence, the C381 can be considered as a successor to the C371.

== History ==
In 2007, the Department of Rapid Transit Systems (DORTS) awarded joint rolling stock contracts to Kawasaki Heavy Industries and the Taiwan Rolling Stock Company to build next generation rolling stock. This was in preparation for the opening of the Xinyi and Songshan extensions. 138 train cars were built from 2010 to 2011. The first 36 train cars were built by Kawasaki at its rolling stock plant in Hyōgo, Japan whereas the remainder were built domestically by the Taiwan Rolling Stock Company (TRSC) to support the domestic rail industry.

In May 2010, the first batch of completed cars arrived in Taiwan. The cars began revenue service on 7 October 2012.

In 2012, DORTS purchased another six-car trainset for use on the Bannan line although it was switched to be used on the Songshan–Xindian line instead.. On 6 November 2026, set 503/504 has started service on the Bannan Line

== Exterior ==
The biggest difference between the appearance of the C381 and its predecessors is the adoption of a more aerodynamic design for the FRP panel on the front. A skirt is also added under the anti-climbers. While the trains are also unpainted like the earlier trains, the blue stripe design was also overhauled and the DORTS logo re-positioned. A glass window is also added to the detrainment door although the detrainment door is still of the same design as that for the C371. Otherwise, the carbody design is the same as that for the older train types. Apart from the headlights which still use halogen lamps, all other lights are LED. Instead of the four ribbon barriers on previous Taipei Metro trains, the gangway connections have four small rectangular fall-prevention barriers, while each carriage has two similar fall-prevention barriers.

== Interior ==
The interior of the C381 is similar to that of its predecessors. It is made of FRP material and has a 45-minute fire and flame resistant design, but there are still many new changes. Notable, triplicated vertical stanchion poles (also adopted on the Kaohsiung MRT and Taoyuan Airport MRT) and a circular handrail is installed from the ceilings for more standing passengers to hold. The handrails adjacent to both sides of the door are now more curved and the draughtscreens also have a curved design. On the contrary, the overhead advertising panels protrude out. The fire extinguisher positions are also changed. For the first time, LCD information displays are also used in addition to the more conventional LED displays and indicators.

The interior gangway connections are modified versions of Taiwan Railways Administration EMU800 series trains that have a similar design.

== Train formation ==
A complete six-car trainset consists of an identical twin set of one driving motor car (DM1), one trailer car (T) and one intermediate motor car (M2) permanently coupled together. The configuration of a C381 trainset in revenue service is DM1–T–M2+M2–T–DM1.

== See also ==
- Taipei Metro VAL256
- Taipei Metro C301
- Taipei Metro C321
- Taipei Metro C341
- Taipei Metro C371
- Taipei Metro BT370
