= Taipei Metro C321 =

Rolling stock used for Taipei Metro

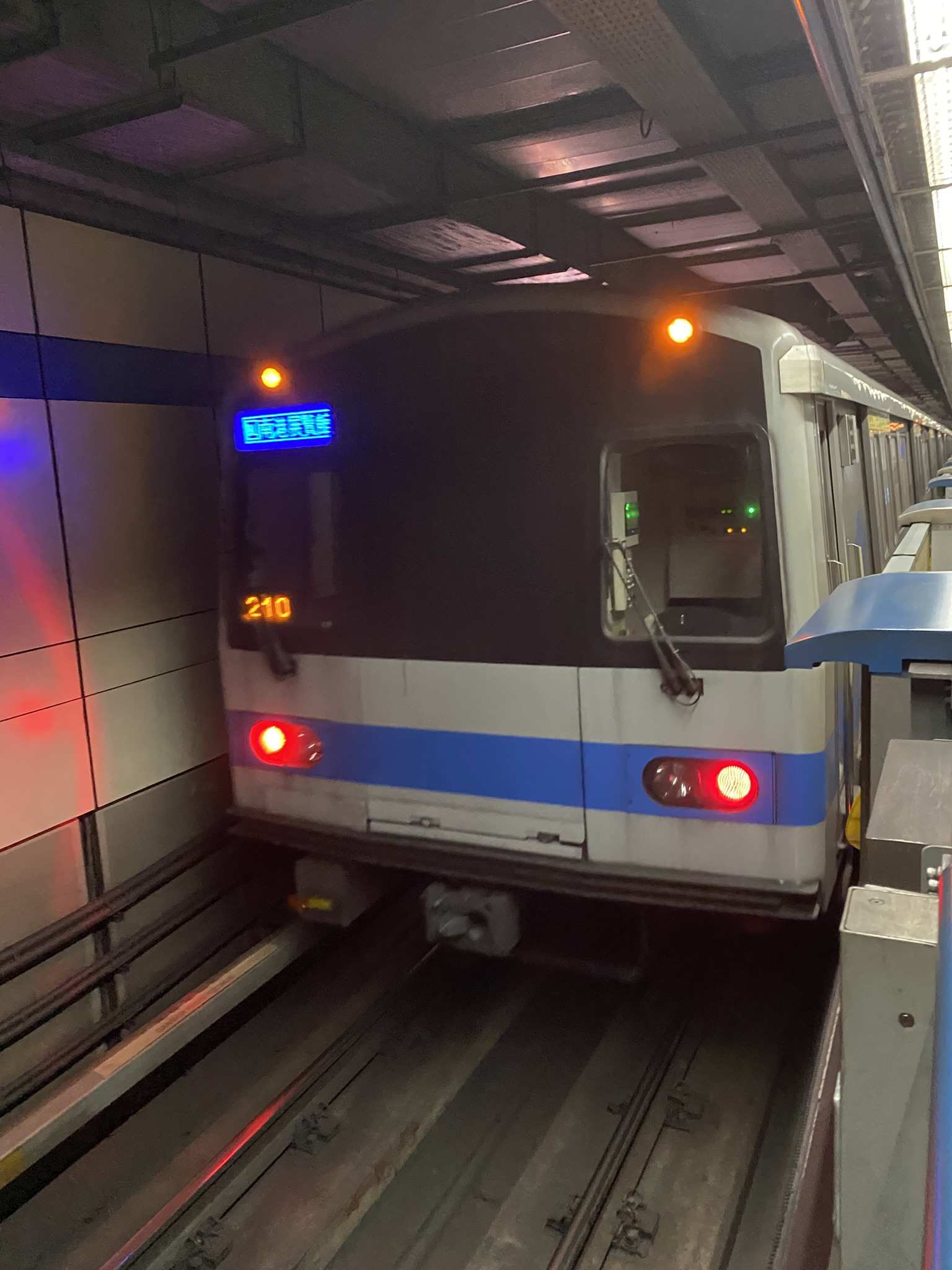
- A modern Taipei Metro C321 in 2025

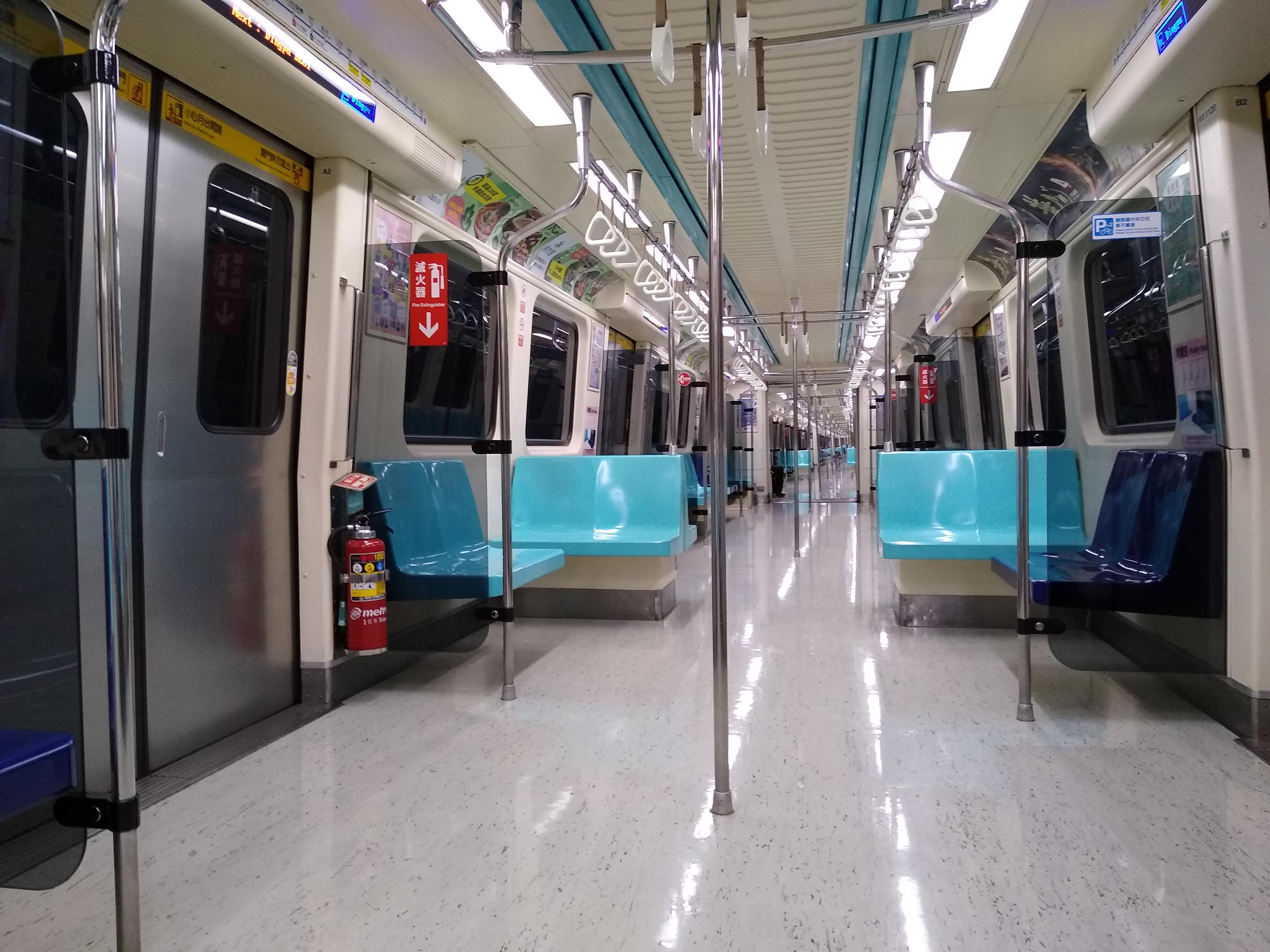
- Interior design of a C321 train
- In service: 1999−present
- Manufacturers: Siemens; SGP Verkehrstechnik; Union Carriage & Wagon; China Steel (assembly of 18 sets)
- Built at: Germany
- Family name: Modular Metro
- Constructed: 1998–1999
- Refurbished: 2023–present
- Number built: 216 vehicles (36 sets)
- Formation: 6-car sets DM1–T–M2+M2–T–DM1
- Fleet numbers: 101/102−115/116; 175/176; 119/120−171/172
- Capacity: 1,914 passengers
- Operator: Taipei Rapid Transit Corporation
- Depots: Tucheng, Nangang
- Line served: Bannan line

Specifications
- Car body construction: Stainless steel
- Train length: 141 m (462 ft 7 in)
- Car length: 23.5 m (77 ft 1 in)
- Width: 3.18 m (10 ft 5 in)
- Height: 3,585 mm (11 ft 9.1 in)
- Wheel diameter: 850–775 mm (33.5–30.5 in) (new–worn)
- Wheelbase: 2.3 m (7 ft 7 in)
- Maximum speed: 90 km/h (56 mph) (design); 80 km/h (50 mph) (service)
- Weight: 39.5 t (38.9 long tons; 43.5 short tons) (DM1/M2); 34 t (33 long tons; 37 short tons) (T)
- Traction system: Siemens G750 D550/600 M5-1 2-level GTO–VVVF (as built); ABB BORDLINE CC750 IGBT–VVVF (after refurbishment)
- Traction motors: 4 × 230 kW (310 hp) 3-phase AC induction motor
- Power output: 3.68 MW (4,930 hp)
- Acceleration: 1 m/s^{2} (2.2 mph/s)
- Deceleration: 1 m/s^{2} (2.2 mph/s) (service); 1.3 m/s^{2} (2.9 mph/s) (emergency)
- Electric systems: 750 V DC third rail
- Current collection: Contact shoe
- UIC classification: Bo′Bo′+2′2′+Bo′Bo′+Bo′Bo′+2′2′+Bo′Bo′
- Bogies: SF 2000
- Braking systems: Regenerative and disc brakes
- Safety systems: ATC/ATO, ATS
- Coupling system: Tomlinson
- Track gauge: 1,435 mm (4 ft 8 1/2 in) standard gauge

The Taipei Metro C321 is the second generation of heavy-capacity rolling stock used on the Taipei Metro in Taipei, Taiwan. Built by Siemens Mobility in Germany, it was introduced on the Bannan line in 1999.

== History ==
Siemens won a contract to build the second batch of 216 cars for the Taipei Metro in 1993. Siemens in turn subcontracted part of the contract to Union Carriage & Wagon of South Africa, which became a focal point of controversy for the Union Rail Car partnership (the builder of the earlier C301 trains) and the United States government, the latter which accused the South African government of subsidising the Siemens bid; Union Carriage & Wagon in return denied any government involvement in the bid. The United States government sought to convince Taipei to reverse the contract award to Siemens but was presumably unsuccessful.

== Exterior ==
The train design was based on the Modular Metro, while the exterior and interior dimensions and configurations are the same as the C301. However, a key distinguishing feature of the C321 is the use of a white flat FRP front as opposed to the grey rounded front of the C301. The general shape of the C321 can also be described as more squarish than the C301 trains.

Following the traction system replacement of the Red line's C301 between 2012 and 2017, the C321 is currently the only train on Taipei Metro to use GTO–VVVF inverters for its AC motors. As the C321 trains have been in service for over 20 years, the TRTC announced the tender for the first time to propose their second traction system replacement together with the C341 in February 2021. The bid opened on 10 May 2021 and on 30 July 2021, TRSC won the contract to do so.

== Interior ==
A significant change of the C321 interior design as compared to the C301 was the ceiling design, where the air-conditioning vents were more exposed and demarcated with blue stripes while the ceiling at each end of the car was lowered to accommodate space for the air-conditioning evaporator. Likewise, the grab pole configuration was also significantly different from the C301 as it was now two side handrails instead of a single central handrail.

Like the C301, the seats are arranged in a mix of transverse and longitudinal arrangements. Most seats are turquoise, while the priority seats are navy blue. The priority seats are at the sides, and 8 seats are between doors, while 3 seats are next to the end of the car and doors.

As with the C301 trains, the Passenger Information Display did not show the doors opening and closing or the time prior to the refurbishment of the sets. Before the refurbishment, it showed the station design and the terminal. Bicycle racks are available at the end cars.

== Deployments ==
The C321 was built in a few different batches: CH321 (11 trainsets) for the Xindian and Tamsui lines, CC361 (8 trainsets) for the Zhonghe line, and CN331 (17 trainsets) for the Nangang line.

When initially introduced, the trains initially served the Tamsui, Xindian, Xiaonanmen, Zhonghe, Banqiao, and Nangang lines and the Xiaobitan branch line. In the case of the Xiaobitan branch line selective door operation had to be used and one half of the trainset used had to be sealed off from public. The C321 was withdrawn from the Xiaobitan branch line on 21 July 2006 with the introduction of a three-car C371 trainset; on 4 March 2009 almost all C321 trainsets were consolidated to the Bannan Line to facilitate the maintenance regime and train dispatching. Use of the C321 on the Xiaonanmen Line was also discontinued in 2013.

== Train formation ==
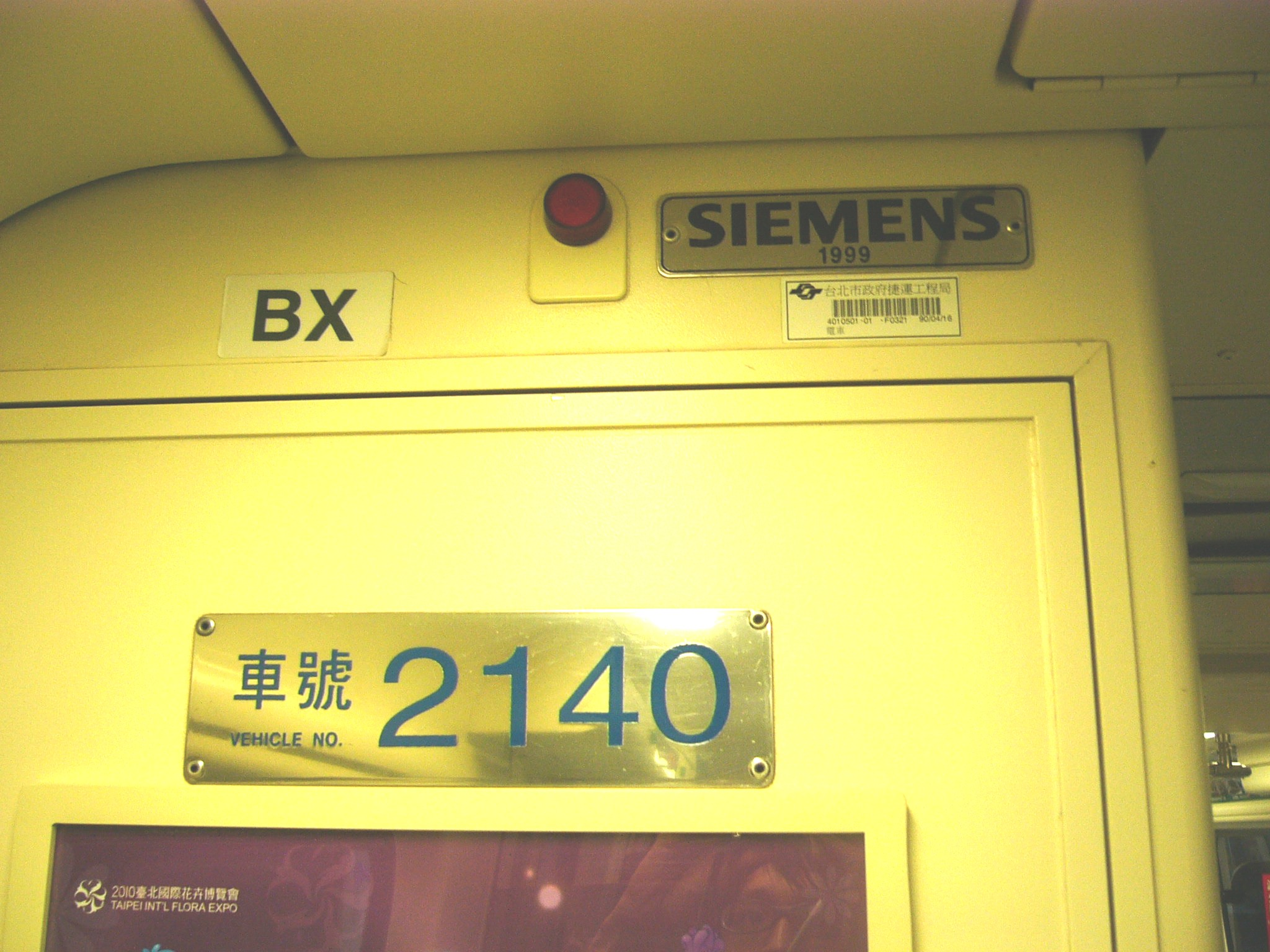
A Siemens builder's plate and a fleet number plate on a C321 train. This car is the trailer car of trainset 140 in the formation 139/140.

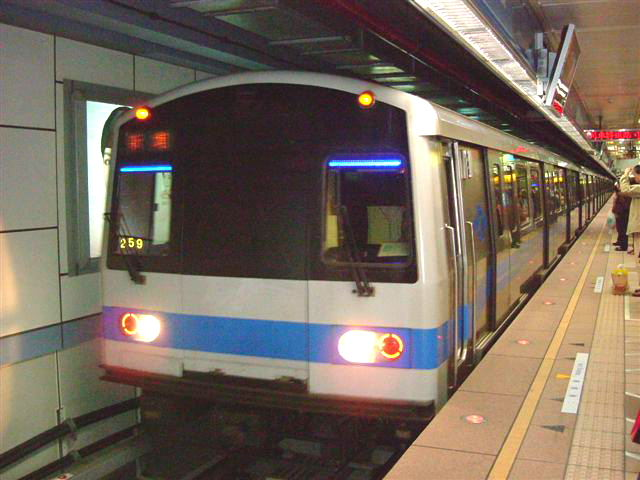
Taipei Metro C321 train in 2005, before LED display conversion

A complete six-car trainset consists of an identical twin set of one driving motor car (DM1), one trailer car (T) and one intermediate motor car (M2) permanently coupled together. The configuration of a C321 trainset in revenue service is DM1–T–M2–M2–T–DM1.

Each car is assigned its own four-digit serial number, which ranges from x101 to x172.

- The first digit (the 'x' above) indicates the position of the car. Hence, DM1 cars use the number x=1, T cars x=2, and M2 cars x=3
- The other three digits are the identification number of the train the car is part of. A full-length train of six cars consists of two identification numbers, one for the first three cars, and another for the second three. The bigger number is always equal to the smaller number plus one, and the smaller number is always an odd number. For example, a train of six cars would have serial numbers 1101, 2101, 3101, 3102, 2102, and 1102, respectively.
- Trainset number 117/118 was temporarily withdrawn from service following the 2014 Taipei Metro attack and underwent disinfection and change of seats. It was then renumbered 175/176 (173/174 was avoided as the number “一七三、一七四” sounded like “一起殺、一起死”, which literally means "kill together, die together") and returned to service in 2015.

== Modifications ==
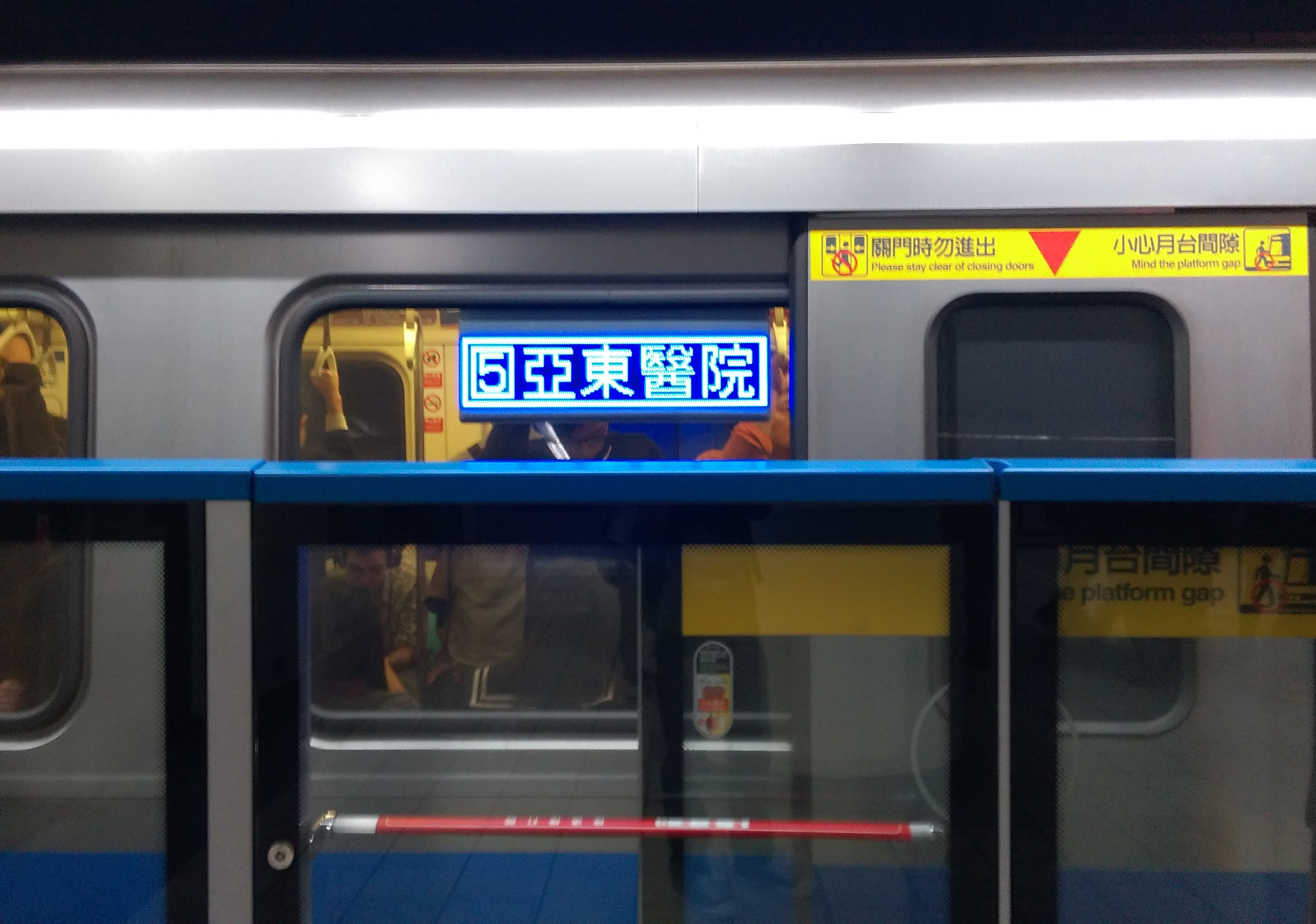
The new full-colour LED side exterior display on a C321

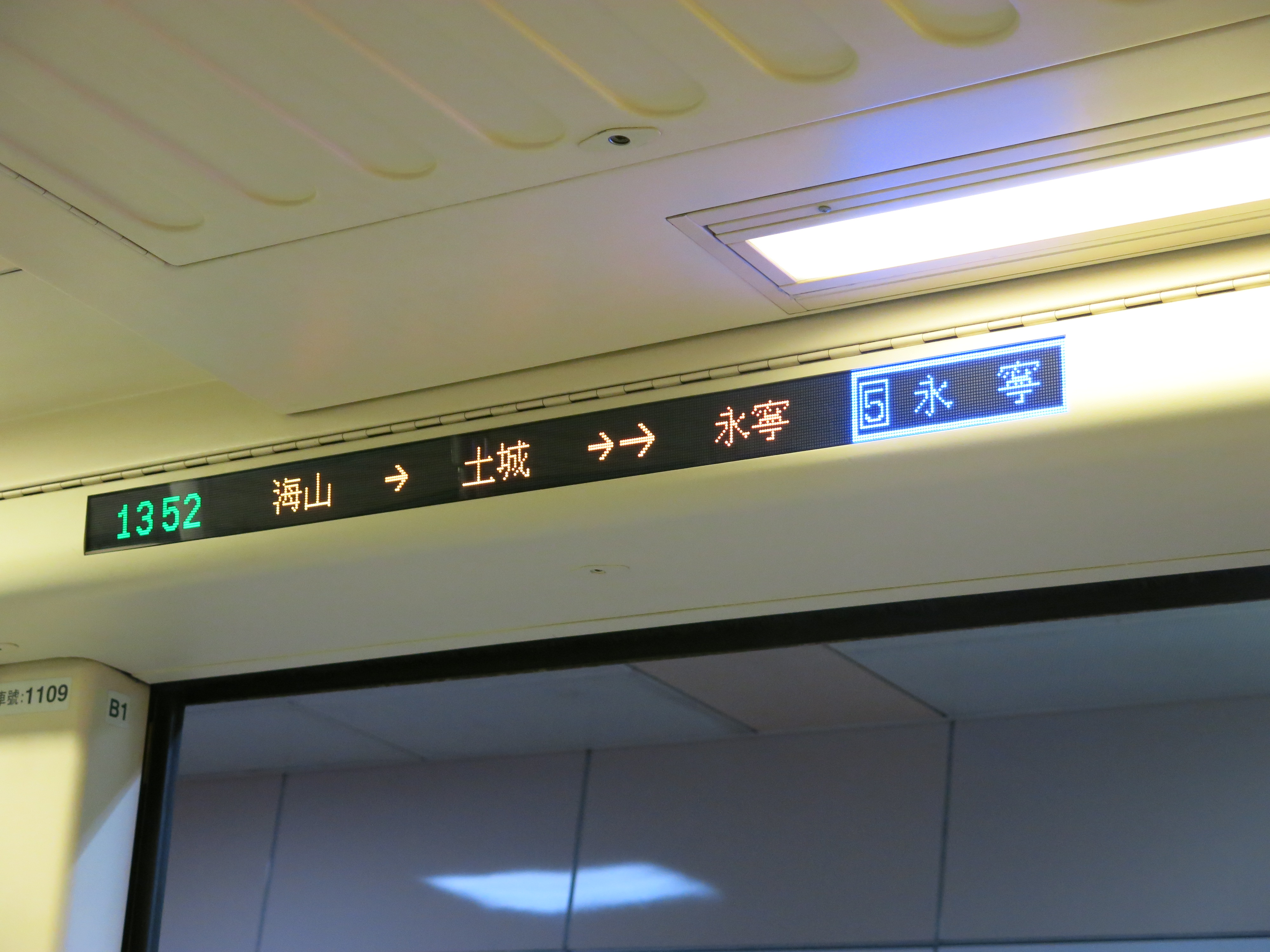
The new full-colour LED interior display on a C321

The original gangway connection were easily prone to damage and were hence replaced by a newer design similar to that on the C341.

In 2009, some seats were modified from transverse to longitudinal arrangements to increase the capacity of the C321.

In 2014, the LED train information displays were updated to full-colour LED displays.

== Withdrawal ==
As of May 2026, since the delivery of the Hyundai Rotem CR381A trains which is used to replace the C301, Taipei Metro has confirmed “There will be no second refurbishment for them, they will approach a 30-year lifespan and retire from service by 2029 instead.” Although the C321 did get refurbished with traction system change, Taipei Metro decided to shift away from giving them a second refurbishment and receiving life extensions for them. Despite their first refurbishment, Taipei Metro decided to cancel the life extension for the C321 due to the arrival of the new rolling stock, which will replace the existing older rolling stock. Since the delivery of the Hyundai Rotem CR381As, Taipei Metro has decided that once a new successor has arrived, keeping the old trains will be extremely impossible due to their aging infrastructure and structural issues, just like the Shanghai Metro 01A07 lowering the 01A01’s demand and the NYC MTA R142/A not receiving new signaling systems and replaced by the R262s around the 2030s because MTA has shifted away from mid-life upgrading the R142/A as of 2026. The C321 are expected to be fully retired from service by 2029 since it entered service in 1999 for its 30-year lifespan that Taipei Metro decided to plan on.

== Derivatives ==
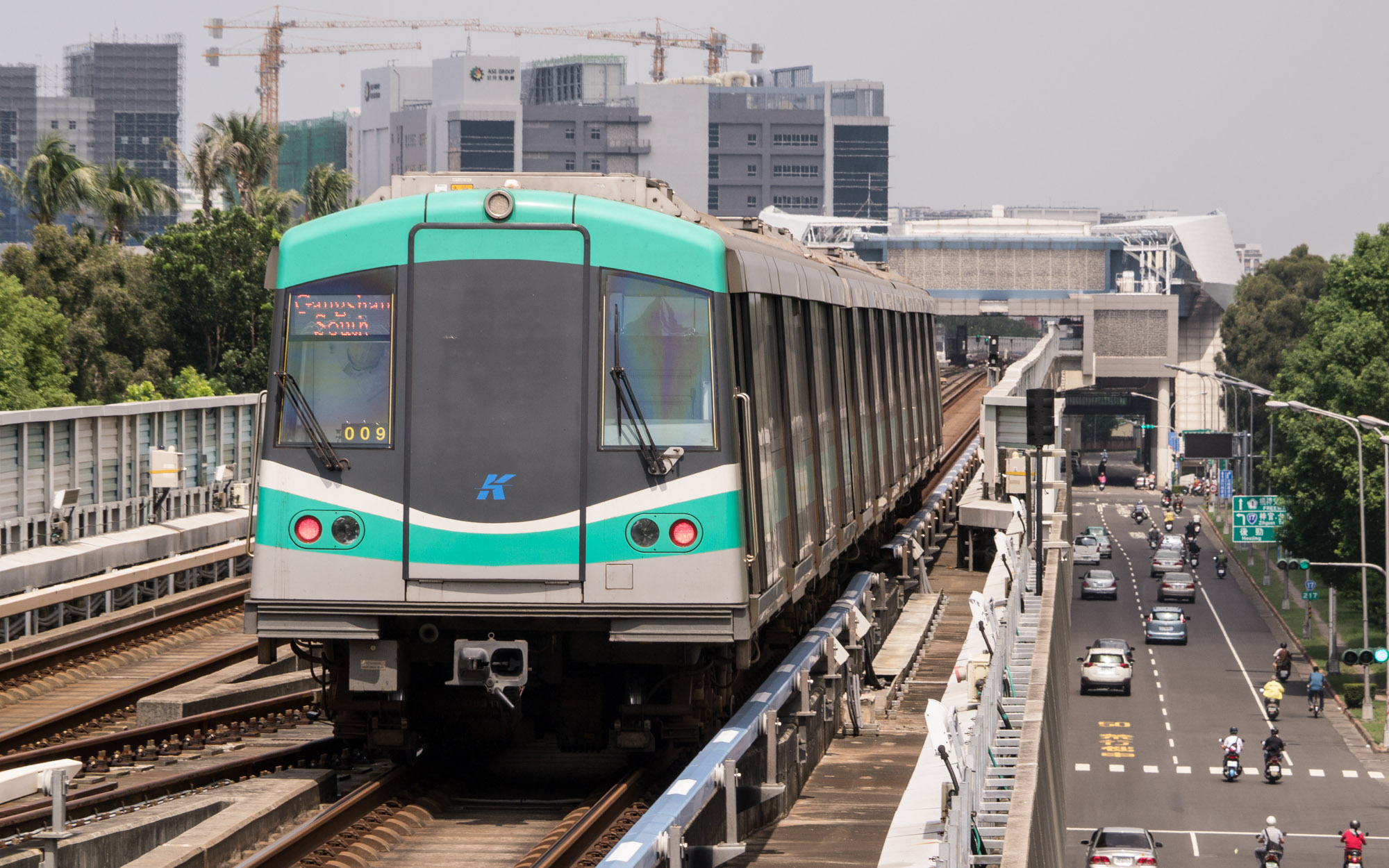
A Siemens-built Kaohsiung Metro train

The Taipei Metro C341 was developed directly from the C321, using IGBT–VVVF inverters for its AC motors, for the Tucheng extension of the Bannan Line. The Kaohsiung Metro also uses the Siemens trains derived from the Taipei Metro.

== See also ==
- Taipei Metro VAL256
- Taipei Metro C301
- Taipei Metro C341
- Taipei Metro C371
- Taipei Metro BT370
- Taipei Metro C381
