= Taipei Metro C371 =

Rolling stock used for Taipei Metro

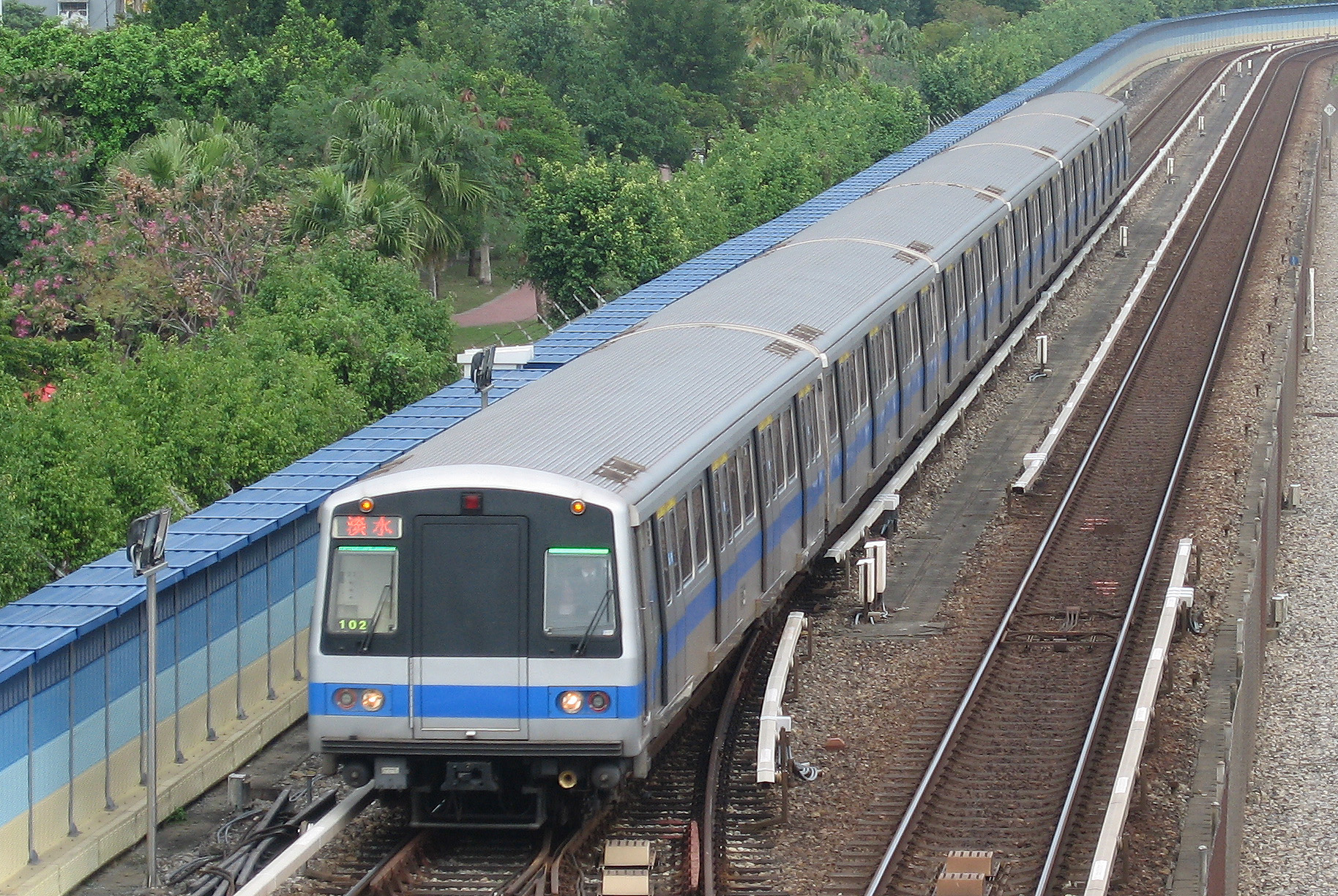
- A C371 train on the Tamsui line.

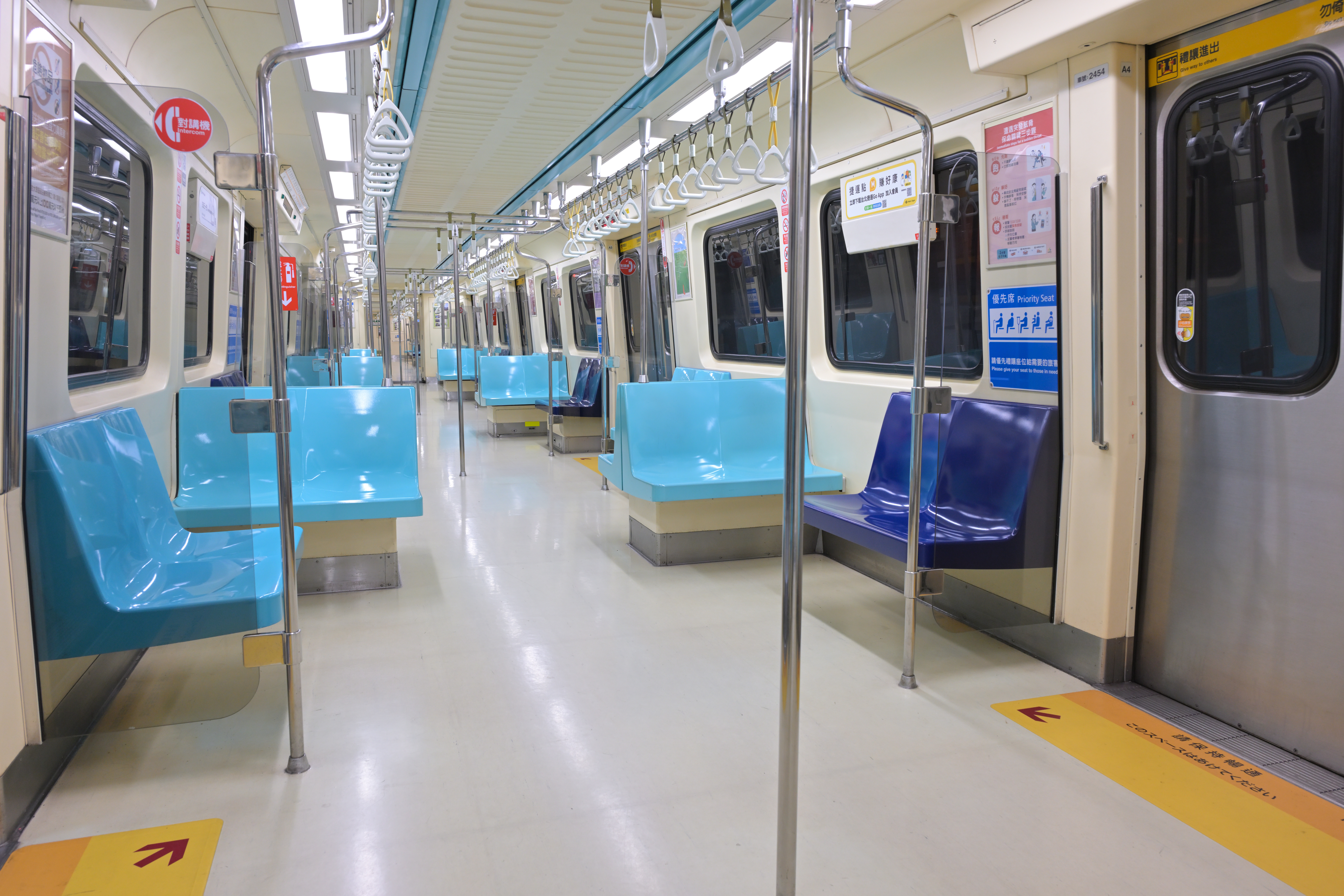
- Interior Design of a C371 train
- In service: 2006–present
- Manufacturers: Kawasaki, Taiwan Rolling Stock Company (Note: Second batch only)
- Built at: Kobe, Hyōgo, Japan (Kawasaki) and Hsinchu, Taiwan (TRSC)
- Constructed: 2005–2009
- Entered service: 22 July 2006 (3-car sets); 22 August 2006 (6-car sets)
- Number built: 321 vehicles (55 sets)
- Formation: 301/302–337/338, 401/402–465/466: 6-car sets (DM1–T–M2+M2–T–DM1); 397–399: 3-car sets (DM1–T–DM2)
- Fleet numbers: 301/302–337/338 (1st batch); 401/402–465/466 (2nd batch); 397–399 (for branch lines only)
- Capacity: 1914 passengers
- Operator: Taipei Rapid Transit Corporation
- Depots: Xindian (301/302–337/338, 397–398); Zhonghe, Luzhou, Xinzhuang (401/402–465/466); Beitou (399)
- Lines served: Songshan–Xindian line; Zhonghe–Xinlu line; Xinbeitou branch line; Xiaobitan branch line

Specifications
- Car body construction: 301 L (66 imp gal; 80 US gal) stainless steel
- Train length: 141 m (462 ft 7 in) (6-car); 70.5 m (231 ft 4 in) (3-car)
- Car length: 23.5 m (77 ft 1 in)
- Width: 3.18 m (10 ft 5 in)
- Height: 3,585 mm (11 ft 9.1 in)
- Wheel diameter: 850–775 mm (33.5–30.5 in) (new–worn)
- Maximum speed: 90 km/h (56 mph) (design); 80 km/h (50 mph) (main line service); 65 km/h (40 mph) (Xiaobitan branch service); 25 km/h (16 mph) (Xinbeitou branch service)
- Weight: 40.1 t (39.5 long tons; 44.2 short tons) (DM); 35 t (34 long tons; 39 short tons) (T); 39 t (38 long tons; 43 short tons) (M2)
- Traction system: Mitsubishi Electric MAP-184-75VD139 2-level IGBT–VVVF
- Traction motors: 4 × Mitsubishi MB-5113-A 175 kW (235 hp) 3-phase AC induction motor
- Power output: 1.4 MW (1,900 hp) (3-car set); 2.8 MW (3,800 hp) (6-car set)
- Acceleration: 1 m/s^{2} (2.2 mph/s)
- Deceleration: 1 m/s^{2} (2.2 mph/s) (service); 1.3 m/s^{2} (2.9 mph/s) (emergency)
- Electric systems: 750 V DC third rail
- Current collection: Contact shoe
- UIC classification: Bo′Bo′+2′2′+Bo′Bo′(+Bo′Bo′+2′2′+Bo′Bo′)
- Braking systems: Regenerative and disc brakes
- Safety systems: ATC/ATO, ATP, ATS
- Coupling system: Tomlinson
- Track gauge: 1,435 mm (4 ft 8 1/2 in) standard gauge

The Taipei Metro C371 is the fourth generation of heavy-capacity rolling stock used on the Taipei Metro in Taipei, Taiwan. Built by Kawasaki Heavy Industries and Taiwan Rolling Stock Company between 2005 and 2009, it was introduced on the Tamsui, Xindian, and Zhonghe Lines in 2006 and on the Xinbeitou and Xiaobitan branch lines in 2007.

== History ==
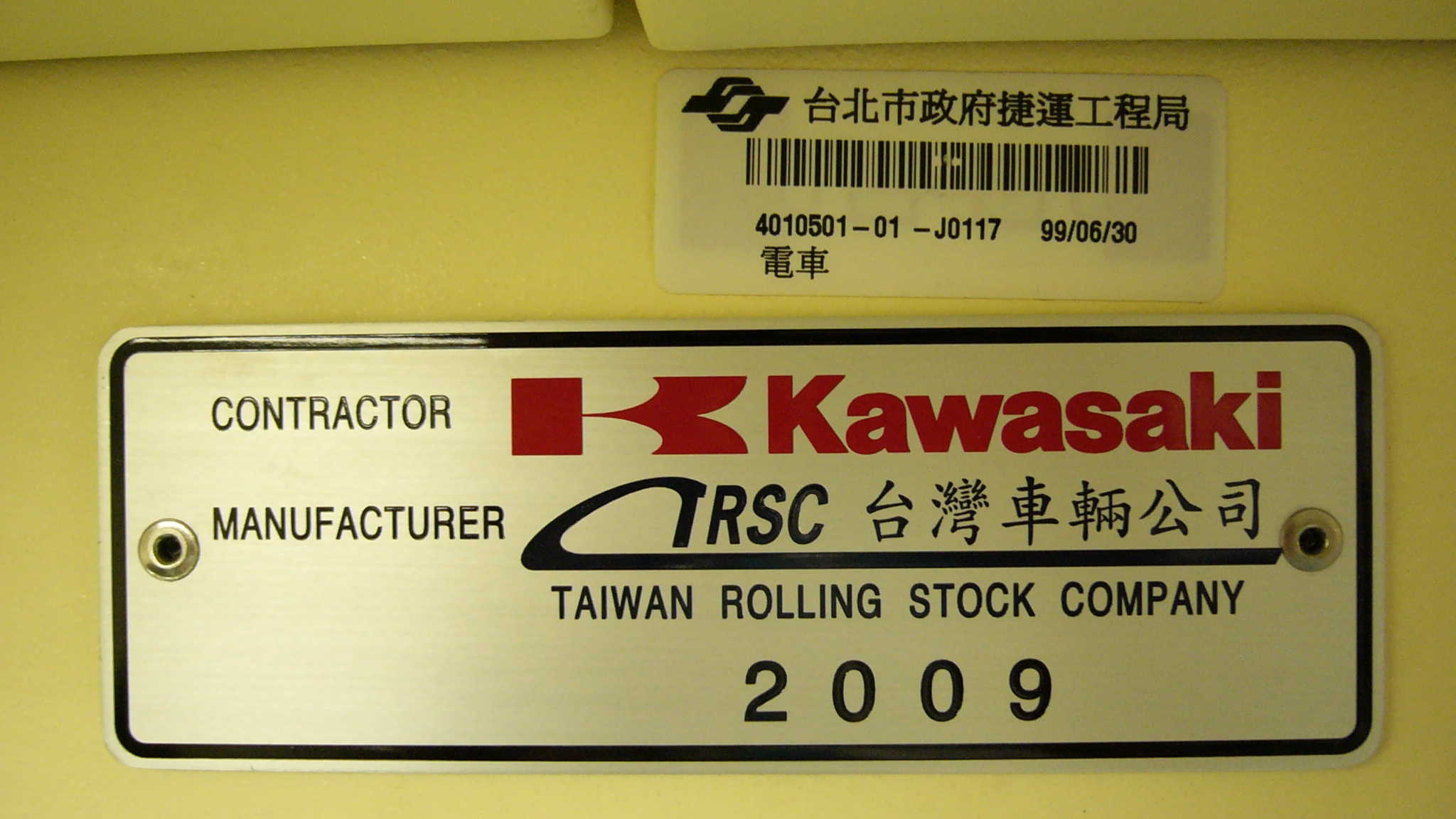
A builder's plate on a C371 showing the roles of Kawasaki and TRSC for the second batch of C371 trains

In 2003, the Department of Rapid Transit Systems (DORTS) of Taipei ordered 321 subway cars from Kawasaki Heavy Industries. Among these vehicles, 144 of them was to be used on the then-upcoming Luzhou and Xinzhuang Sections of the Zhonghe–Xinlu line whereas the remaining 177 cars were to increase the capacity of the existing network. As part of the Industrial Cooperation Program mandated by the Taiwanese government, the first half of trains were built by Kawasaki at its rolling stock plant in Hyōgo whereas the other half was to be built domestically by the Taiwan Rolling Stock Company (TRSC).

The C371 trains were built in two different batches:

- The first batch of trains (numbered in the 300-series; built from 2005-2007) were completely built-up by Kawasaki in Japan and were part of contracts TA001 (the main batch), CH321A (a 3-car set for the Xiaobitan branch line) and CE361 for the Nangang section eastern extension of the Bannan line.
- The second batch of trains (numbered in the 400-series; built from 2008 to 2009) were built specifically for the Zhonghe–Xinlu line and were part of contracts CE601 (for the Luzhou section) and CK371 (for the Xinzhuang section). Sets 419 to 430 were built by Kawasaki whereas the remainder were assembled from complete knock-down (CKD) kits imported from Nippon Sharyo by TRSC.

In 2006, the first C371 trainset was introduced into service on the Xiaonanmen Line (the CKS Memorial Hall-Ximen segment of the Songshan–Xindian line). Deliveries of the trains continued until June 2009.

== Overview ==
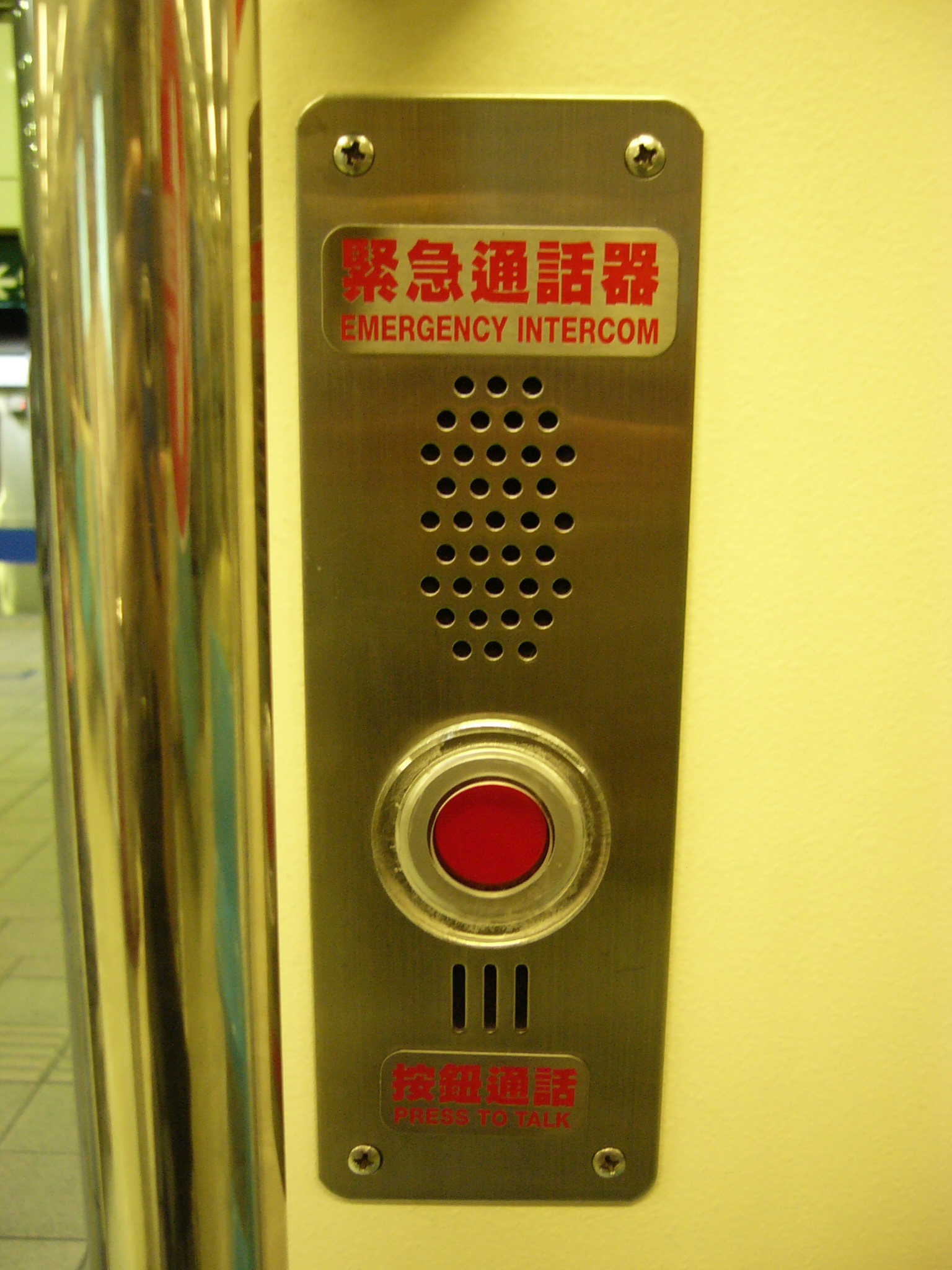
An emergency intercom button on a first-batch C371 train

The C371 retains a largely similar design seen on the C301, C321 and C341. Unlike its earlier counterparts however, the C371 had several differences as it follows:

- The C371, along with the C381, uses a quieter IGBT–VVVF inverter control as compared to earlier train types, in this case from Mitsubishi Electric.
- The end cars now feature completely longitudinal seating instead of transverse seating traditionally used on Taipei MRT trains.
- The passenger doors now use electric door actuators instead of pneumatic ones.
- Security cameras were already installed on board the trains when new.
- Priority seats now take on a darker shade of blue.
- Taillights are now LED.
- An additional chime is added when the doors open.
- The front LED destination display now uses a larger font and is brighter to improve visibility.
- The driving console includes a train supervising information system (TSIS) to assist driving and maintenance.
- Bicycle storage spaces are fitted in the interior.
- The second batch trains use a different design of emergency communication button from the first batch.

== Set 399 ==
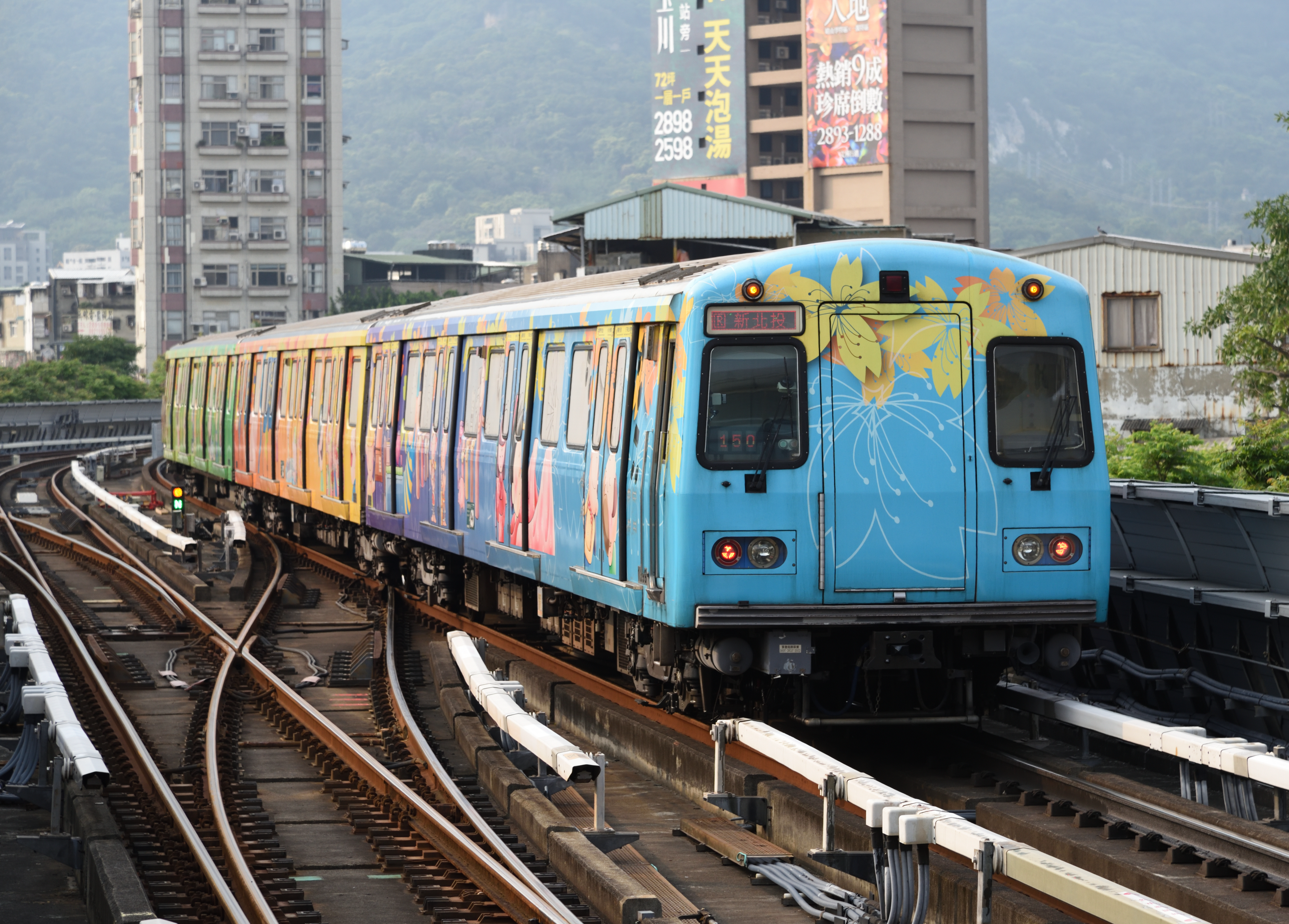
Set 399 departing Beitou

In 2009, Kawasaki also supplied a 3-car set numbered by DORTS as 399 for the Xinbeitou branch line. Set 399 notably stands out among the other C371 trainsets as it is designed as a concept advertisement train to promote the hot springs in Xinbeitou. While sharing the same technical specifications with the other C371 trainsets, set 399 has a multi-colour livery and features a unique interior design with the theme of onsen in mind.

== Fleet numbering ==
A complete six-car trainset consists of an identical twin set of one driving motor car (DM1), one trailer car (T) and one intermediate motor car (M2) permanently coupled together. The configuration of a 6-car C371 set in revenue service is DM1–T–M2+M2–T–DM1 whereas that for a 3-car set is DM1–T–DM2.

Each car is assigned its own four-digit serial number, which ranges from x301 to x338 (1st batch; 6-car sets), x397 to x399 (3-car sets for branch lines), and x401 to x466 (2nd batch; 6-car sets).

- The first digit (the 'x' above) indicates the position of the car. Hence, DM1 cars use the number x=1, T cars x=2, and M2 cars x=3
- The other three digits are the identification number of the train the car is part of. A full-length train of six cars consists of two identification numbers, one for the first three cars, and another for the second three. The bigger number is always equal to the smaller number plus one, and the smaller number is always an odd number. For example, a train of six cars would have serial numbers 1301, 2301, 3301, 3302, 2302, and 1302, respectively.

== Derivatives ==
The Taipei Metro C381 was developed directly from the C371 and used for both the Tamsui–Xinyi line and the Songshan–Xindian line. The Taoyuan Airport MRT train sets also utilizes trains based on the C371, for both the commuter and express services.

== See also ==
- Taipei Metro VAL256
- Taipei Metro C301
- Taipei Metro C321
- Taipei Metro C341
- Taipei Metro BT370
- Taipei Metro C381
