= Innovia APM 256 =

Rolling stock of Taipei Metro Wenhu Line and O'Hare ATS

Innovia APM 256 (Taipei Metro C370/BT370)
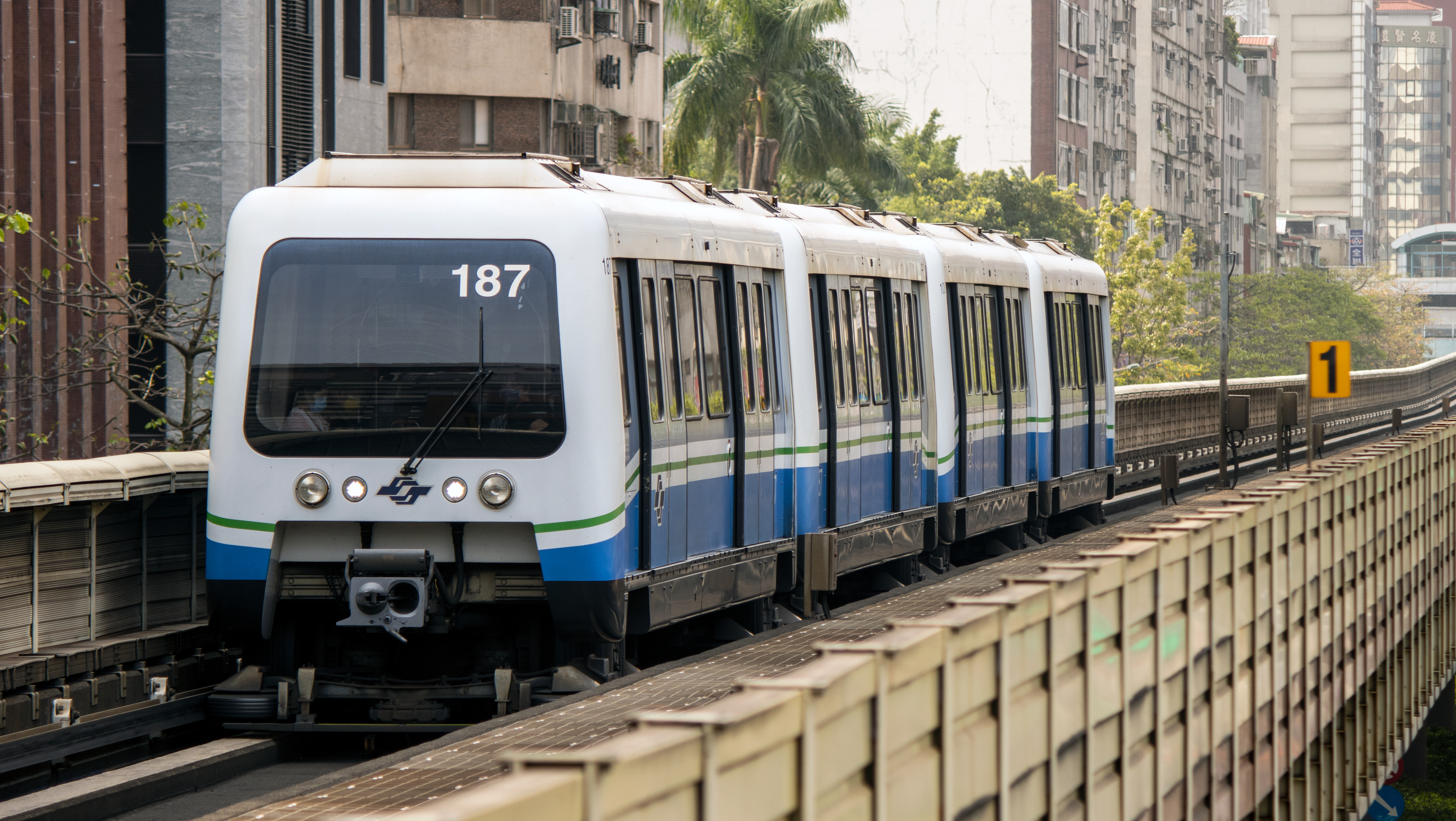
- An INNOVIA APM 256 train approaching Daan station, April 2021

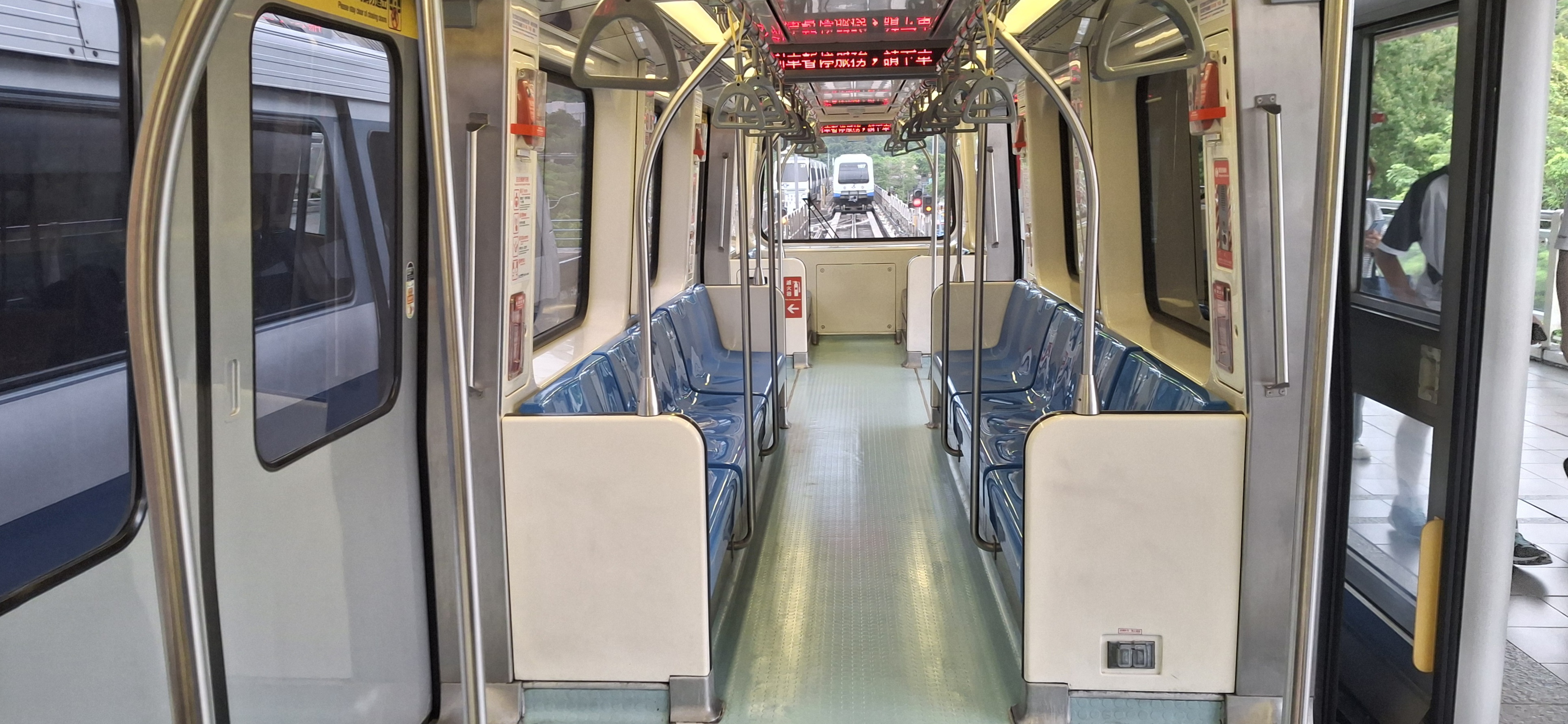
- Interior of the INNOVIA APM 256
- In service: 2009–present (Taipei); 2021–present (Chicago)
- Manufacturer: Bombardier Transportation (now Alstom)
- Built at: West Mifflin, Pittsburgh, PA, USA
- Family name: INNOVIA APM
- Replaced: VAL 256 (Chicago) (Note: VAL 256 continues to operate in Taipei alongside INNOVIA APM 256 with upgraded signalling provided by Bombardier Transportation)
- Constructed: 2006–2009 (Taipei); 2017–2019 (Chicago)
- Entered service: 4 July 2009 (Taipei); 3 November 2021 (Chicago)
- Number built: 238
- Number in service: Taipei: 202 carriages (101 units); Chicago: 36 carriages (12 trains)
- Formation: Taipei: 2 cars per unit, 2 units per train; Chicago: 3 cars (A–B–C) per train
- Fleet numbers: Taipei: 101–201; Chicago: 1–12
- Capacity: 162 (20 seated, 142 standing) per car (Taipei); 49 (8 seated, 41 standing) per car (Chicago)
- Operators: Taipei Rapid Transit Corporation (Taipei); Chicago Department of Aviation (Chicago)
- Depots: Taipei: Muzha, Neihu; Chicago: Terminal 1, Multi Modal Facility
- Lines served: Wenhu line (Taipei); ATS Airport Transit System (Chicago)

Specifications
- Car body construction: Aluminium
- Car length: 13.78 m (45 ft 3 in)
- Width: 2.54 m (8 ft 4 in)
- Height: 3.53 m (11 ft 7 in)
- Doors: 2 × 2 per car
- Maximum speed: 90 km/h (56 mph) (design); 80 km/h (50 mph) (Chicago service); 70 km/h (43 mph) (Taipei service)
- Weight: 37.2 tonnes (82,000 lb)
- Traction system: Bombardier MITRAC TC540 AU IGBT–VVVF
- Traction motors: 2 × Bombardier 1512A 118 kW (158 hp) 3-phase AC induction motor
- Power output: 236 kW (316 hp) (Note: This pertains to one carriage.)
- Acceleration: 1 m/s^{2} (3.3 ft/s^{2})
- Deceleration: 1 m/s^{2} (3.3 ft/s^{2}) (service); 2.35 m/s^{2} (7.7 ft/s^{2}) (emergency)
- Electric systems: 750 V DC third rail
- Current collection: Contact shoe
- UIC classification: AA
- AAR wheel arrangement: A-A
- Safety system: Moving block Bombardier CITYFLO 650 CBTC–ATC under ATO GoA 4 (UTO)
- Coupling system: Scharfenberg
- Track gauge: 1,880 mm (6 ft 2 in)

The Bombardier INNOVIA APM 256 (internally code-named the Taipei Metro C370 or BT370 by the operational arm of Taipei Metro, Taipei Rapid Transit Corporation) is the second generation of automated guideway transit rolling stock to be used on Wenhu line (Brown Line) of the Taipei Metro. They are distinguished from their predecessors, Matra VAL256, by their circular front headlights and a grey livery, with a green stripe above. Also, instead of yellow forward-facing seats, the train offers blue seats that face inward.

A total of 101 2-car train sets were purchased and produced, for a total of 202 cars. The sets are numbered from 101 to 201, with both cars in a set receiving the same numbers. They were originally numbered from 52 to 152, continuing the sequence from the first-generation Matra-made sets, but in order to distinguish between the newer and older trains, they were renumbered from 101 onwards.

In May 2015, the Chicago O'Hare Airport Transit System (ATS) awarded Bombardier with a contract to supply 36 Innovia APM 256 vehicles, replacing all VAL 256 vehicles currently in service. The ATS was initially shut down for complete overhaul on 8 January 2019 and was expected to open in Autumn 2019. However, this was delayed to 3 November 2021.

== See also ==
- Taipei Metro VAL256 - Also serving on Wenhu line
- Taipei Metro C301 - Serving on Tamsui–Xinyi line
- Taipei Metro C321 - Serving on Bannan line
- Taipei Metro C341 - Serving on Bannan line
- Taipei Metro C371 - Serving on Songshan–Xindian line, Zhonghe–Xinlu line, Xinbeitou branch line and Xiaobitan branch line
- Taipei Metro C381 - Serving on Tamsui–Xinyi line and Songshan–Xindian line
- Airport Transit System - Transit system at Chicago O'Hare International Airport that uses 36 INNOVIA APM 256 cars
