= Airport Transit System =

People mover system at O'Hare International Airport

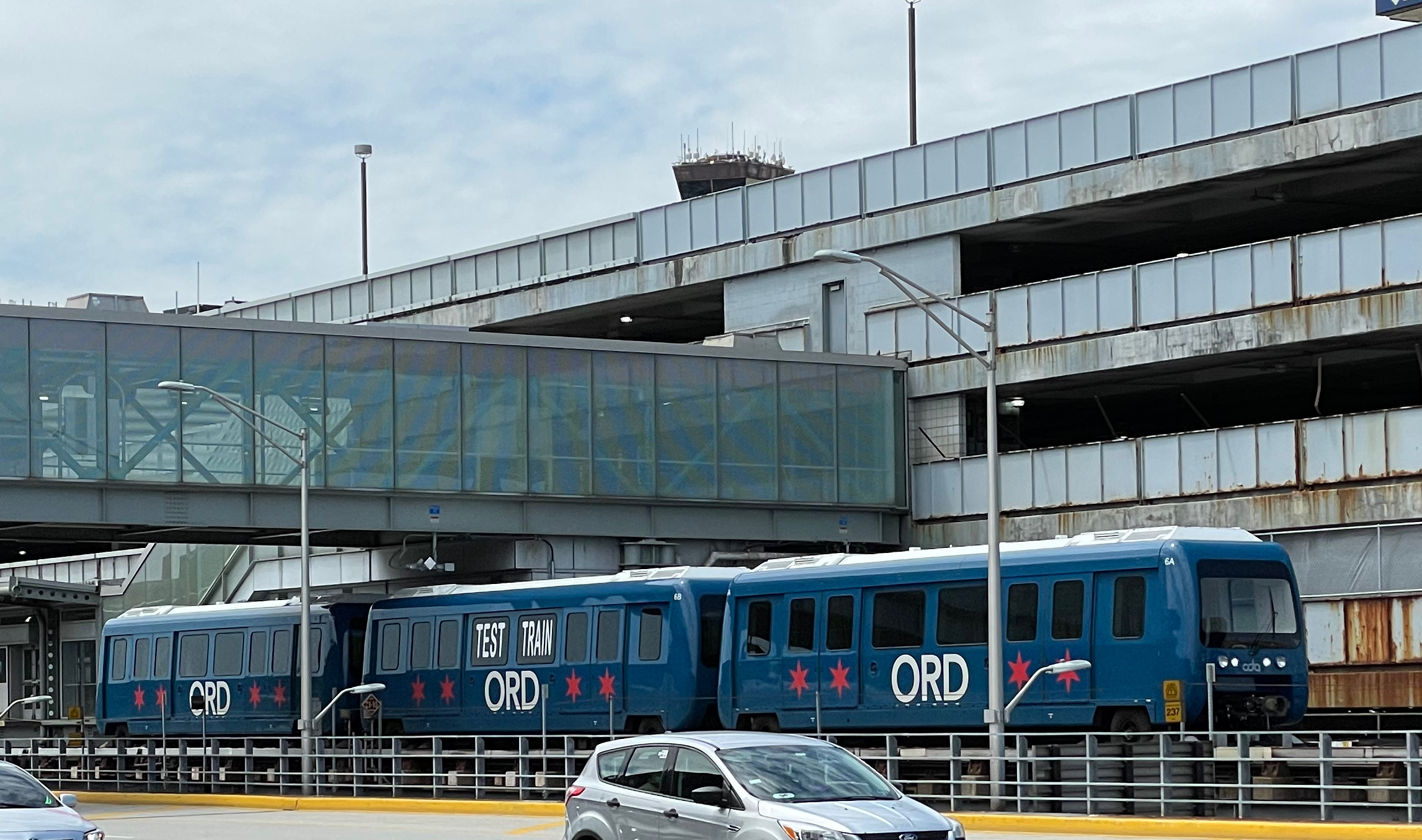
- A Bombardier Innovia APM 256 undergoing testing in May 2021

Overview
- Owner: Chicago Department of Aviation
- Locale: O'Hare International Airport, Chicago, Illinois
- Termini: Terminal 1 (westbound); Multi Modal Facility
- Stations: 5
- Website: Official website

Service
- Type: People mover
- Operator: Chicago Department of Aviation
- Rolling stock: Bombardier Innovia APM 256

History
- Opened: May 6, 1993
- Closed: January 8, 2019
- Reopened: November 3, 2021

Technical
- Line length: 3 mi (4.8 km)
- Num of tracks: 2
- Character: Elevated
- Track gauge: 1,880 mm (6 ft 2 in)
- Electrification: Third rail, 750 V DC
- Operating speed: 50 mph (80 km/h)
Route map
Airport Transit System highlighted in dark blue
Key

The Airport Transit System (ATS) is an automated people mover system at Chicago O'Hare International Airport. It opened on May 6, 1993. The ATS moves passengers between the airport terminals and parking facilities, and was designed to operate 24 hours a day, 7 days a week. The system was closed for refurbishment and modernization between January 2019 and November 2021.

== History ==
=== Planning and construction ===
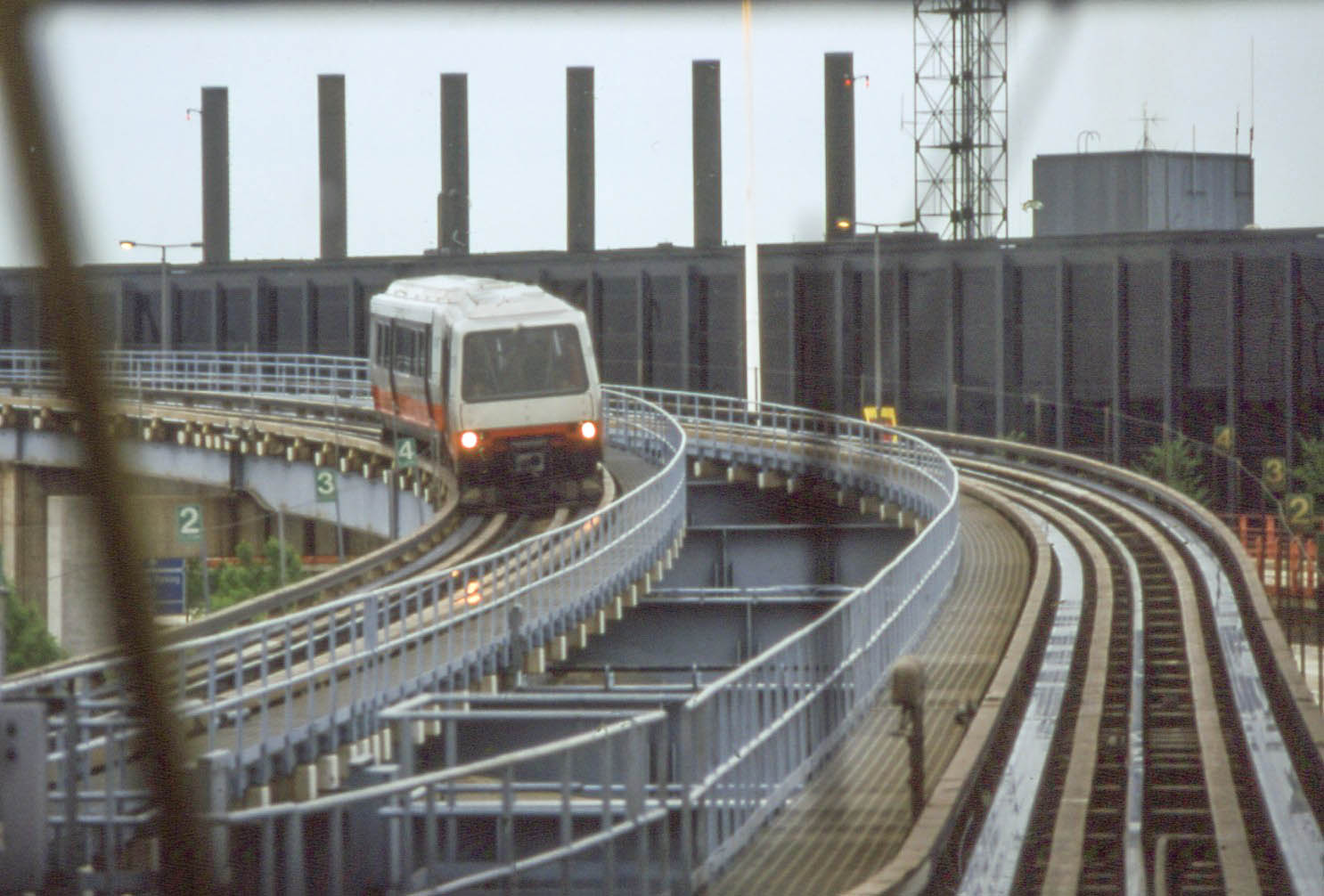
A Former VAL256 ATS Train In 1996

In 1982, O'Hare officials unveiled the O'Hare Development Plan, a plan to expand the airport with a new international terminal (now called Terminal 5), and an expansion of the domestic terminals. The new international terminal, located away from the domestic terminals, necessitated the creation of a people mover to allow for connections between domestic and international flights. The system was also intended to provide connections to distant parking facilities. The City of Chicago first awarded the contract for the people mover system to Westinghouse Electric, the second lowest bidder, in 1985. After simplifying their initial proposal in response to concerns from City, the contract was re-awarded to low bidder Matra. Ground was broken in 1987 by Mayor Harold Washington, who died later that year. The system ultimately opened in May 1993.

=== Modernization and extension ===
As part of a larger, $800 million project involving a new integrated transit center, the ATS began a modernization project in 2018. The expansion included replacing the existing 15-car fleet with 36 new Bombardier Innovia APM 256 vehicles, upgrading the previous infrastructure, and extending the line 2,000 feet (610 m) to the new Multi-Modal Facility on the east side of U.S. 12–45 (Mannheim Road). Previously, the line ended at Remote Parking. Remote Parking station still stands, but is disused and trains no longer stop there as the air passenger parking lot the station once served was converted to airport employee parking concurrent with the opening of the Multi-Modal Facility. The system closed in January 2019 for construction and testing of the planned modernization, with airport-funded shuttle buses running in public trafficways servicing the destinations previously serviced by the ATS. Originally, the ATS was to reopen by Fall of 2019, but this was delayed several times due in part to the COVID-19 pandemic, contract disputes, and reliability. The Chicago Department of Aviation reopened the system in November 2021 with a limited schedule. The system returned to 24 hour service in April 2022.

== Service ==
The Airport Transit System operates 24 hours a day, 7 days a week. The system is free to users and connects O'Hare's terminals to parking lots, bus and train connections, and the consolidated rental car facility.

The system is in a two track configuration with multiple crossovers, which allows more than one train to travel along a track at once while providing service in both directions. The entire system uses platform screen doors, preventing people from leaving the platform, falling on the tracks or tampering with restricted areas.

The system's 36 cars are joined into 3-car trains, with each train able to carry up to 147 passengers.

=== Stations ===
ATS stations are fully accessible and provide access to the elevated ATS tracks. The system has two tracks, and each train stops at all five stations traveling in both directions. Its west end is at Terminal 1, at the west end of the terminal core, and it makes a counterclockwise loop around the parking garage with stops at Terminal 2 and Terminal 3. Parking Garage A (the main garage) is accessible from any of the three terminal stations, as is the O'Hare terminal of the CTA's Blue Line. Parking Lots B and C are only accessible from Terminal 1 and 3 stations, respectively. It takes 10 minutes to travel from Terminal 1 to the consolidated rental car facility.

Outside the terminal loop, the ATS travels east to Terminal 5, the airport's international terminal. It then turns north, crosses over the main access road and Blue Line, and crosses Mannheim Road to reach the consolidated rental car facility, which is the terminal for Pace bus routes 250, 330, and the Pulse Dempster Line. The facility also connects with the O'Hare Transfer station on Metra's North Central Service, providing commuter rail service to Chicago Union Station inbound and Antioch outbound during service hours. Currently, the Metra station is open on weekdays only.

=== Fleet ===
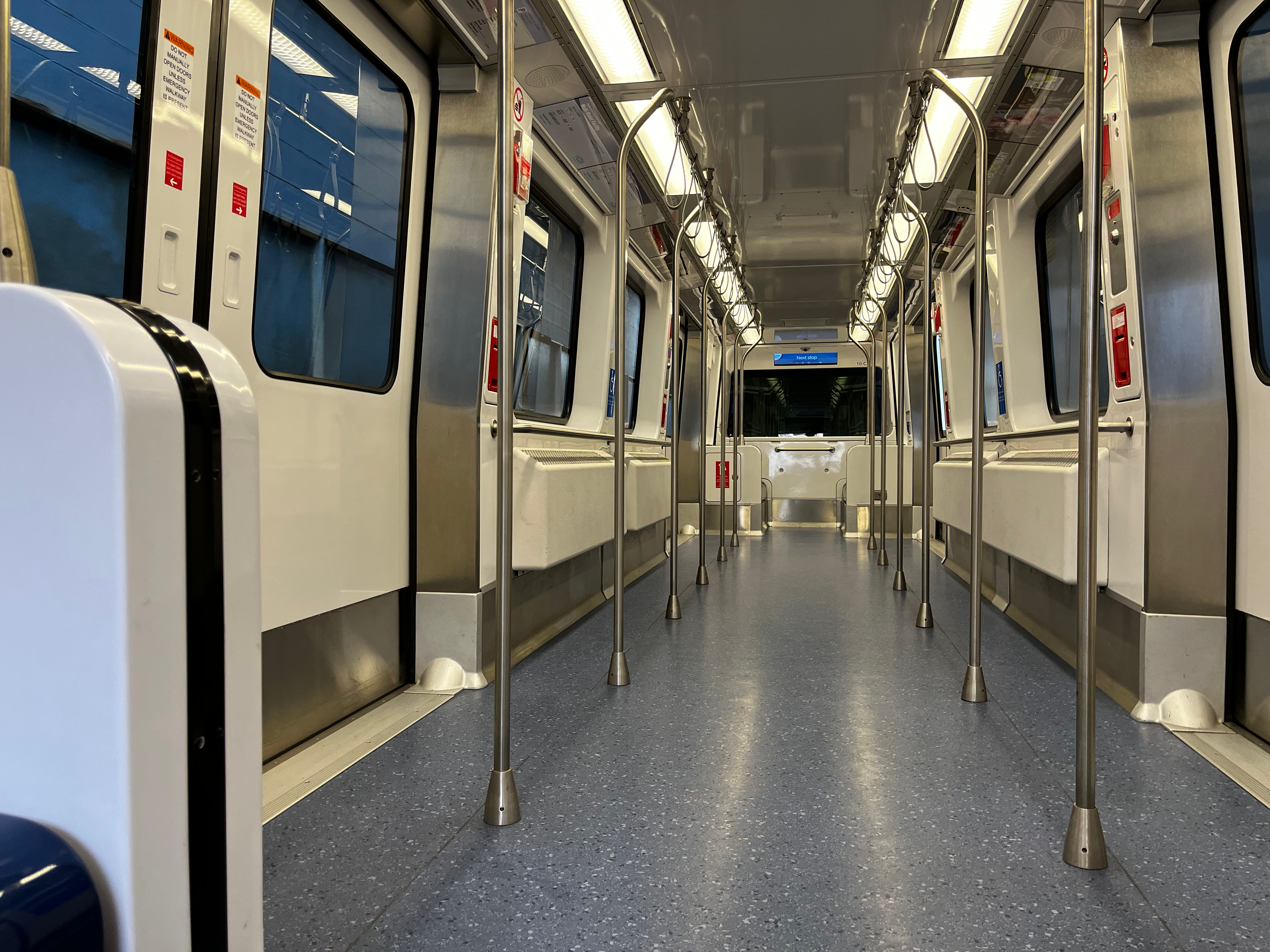
Interior of newly operated Innovia APM256 Cars in 2021

The ATS originally used the French-based VAL technology, which features fully automated, rubber-tired people mover cars that previously saw use on the Jacksonville Skyway until 1989. The system is capable of traveling at speeds of up to 50 mph (80 km/h), and now uses 12 3-car Bombardier Innovia APM 256 trains, which replaced the previous 15 Matra VAL 256 vehicles.

As of 2023, the previous 15 VAL trains are sitting in a vacant lot on airport property near Irving Park Road and Taft Avenue.
