= Taipei Metro C341 =

Class of electric multiple units on the Taipei Metro Blue line

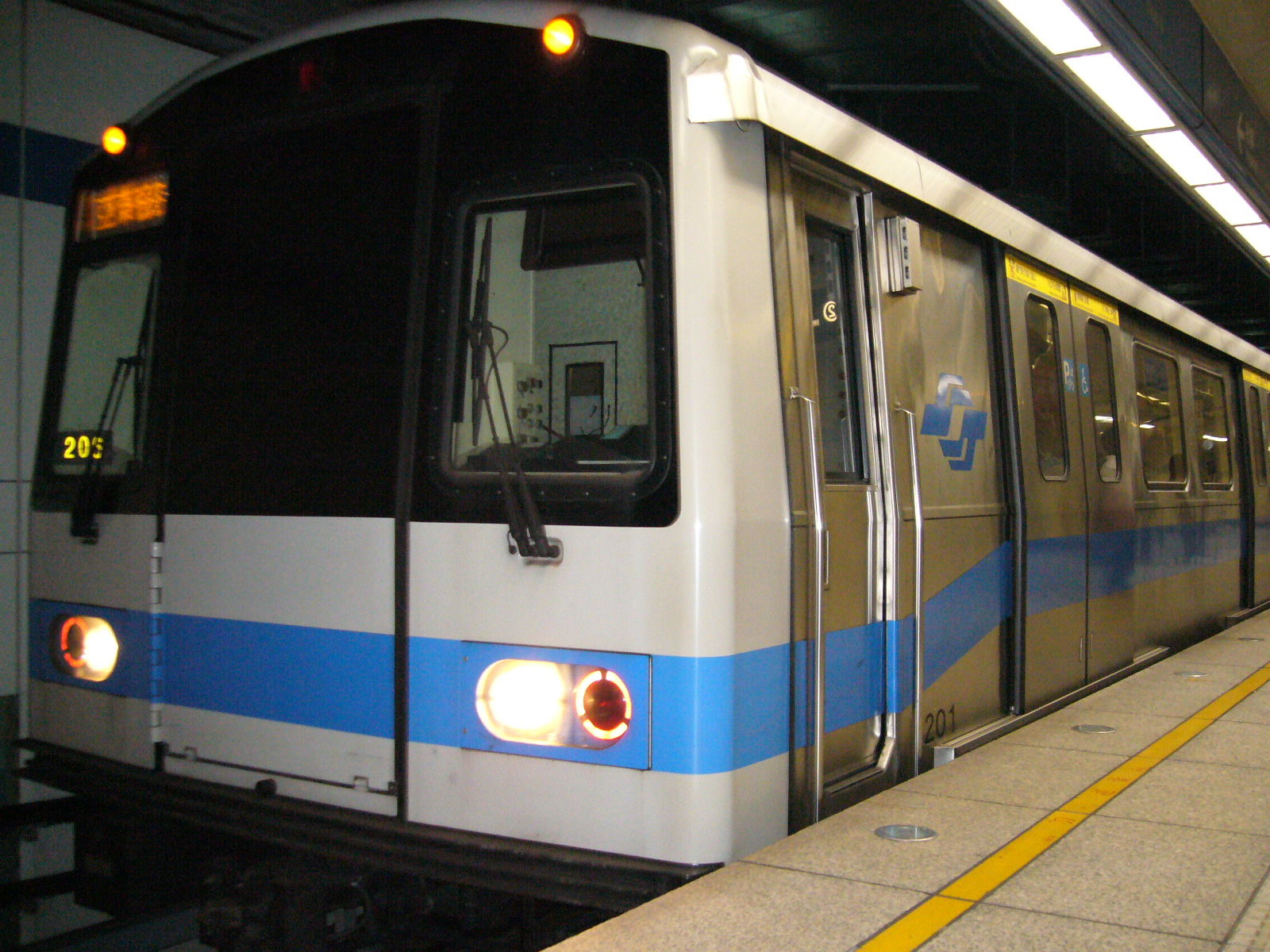
- A C341 at Ximen in May 2006

- Train Interior
- In service: 2004–present
- Manufacturers: Siemens, SGP Verkehrstechnik
- Built at: Vienna, Austria
- Family name: Modular Metro
- Constructed: 2003
- Number built: 36 vehicles (6 sets)
- Formation: 6-car sets DM1–T–M2+M2–T–DM1
- Fleet numbers: 201/202–211/212
- Capacity: 1914 passengers
- Operator: Taipei Rapid Transit Corporation
- Depots: Tucheng, Nangang
- Line served: Bannan line

Specifications
- Car body construction: Stainless steel
- Train length: 141 m (462 ft 7 in)
- Car length: 23.5 m (77 ft 1 in)
- Width: 3.18 m (10 ft 5 in)
- Height: 3,585 mm (11 ft 9.1 in)
- Wheel diameter: 850–775 mm (33.5–30.5 in) (new–worn)
- Wheelbase: 2.3 m (7 ft 7 in)
- Maximum speed: 90 km/h (56 mph) (design); 80 km/h (50 mph) (service)
- Weight: 39.5 t (38.9 long tons; 43.5 short tons) (DM1/M2); 34 t (33 long tons; 37 short tons) (T)
- Traction system: Siemens G750 D580/600 M5-1 2-level IGBT–VVVF
- Traction motors: 4 × Siemens 1TB2013-2GA02 230 kW (310 hp) 3-phase AC induction motor
- Power output: 3.68 MW (4,930 hp)
- Acceleration: 1 m/s^{2} (2.2 mph/s)
- Deceleration: 1 m/s^{2} (2.2 mph/s) (service); 1.3 m/s^{2} (2.9 mph/s) (emergency)
- Electric systems: 750 V DC third rail
- Current collection: Contact shoe
- UIC classification: Bo′Bo′+2′2′+Bo′Bo′+Bo′Bo′+2′2′+Bo′Bo′
- Bogies: SF 2000
- Braking systems: Regenerative and disc brakes
- Safety systems: ATC/ATO, ATS
- Coupling system: Tomlinson
- Track gauge: 1,435 mm (4 ft 8 1/2 in) standard gauge

The Taipei Metro C341 is the third generation of heavy capacity electric multiple units on the Taipei Metro in Taipei, Taiwan. Built by Siemens Mobility and SGP Verkehrstechnik in Austria, it was introduced on the Bannan line in 2004.

== History ==
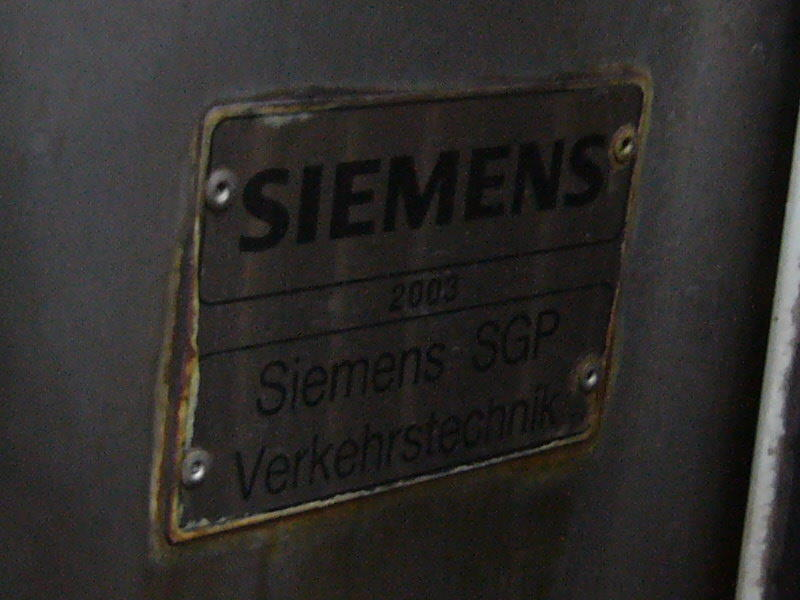
The C341 trains were built by SGP Verkehrstechnik.

The C341 stands out among other Taipei Metro trains for not being directly procured by the Department of Rapid Transit Systems (DORTS) but rather by Continental Engineering Corporation, the project contractor of the Tucheng Line. Continental Engineering initially intended to procure the new trains from KOROS (joint-venture between Hyundai-Rotem and Daewoo, now Hyundai Rotem) of South Korea but this proposal was rejected by DORTS. Hence, Continental Engineering decided to purchase six new six-car trainsets from Siemens, the supplier of the earlier C321 trains, at NT$ 2,248 million; the price per car for the C341 was hence 1.5 times more than that for the C321, which were directly procured by DORTS. The C341 trains were handed over to DORTS from mid-September to mid-November 2004 and began operations on the Bannan Line in January 2005.

With the launch of the C341, the number of extra trains in the morning peak time of the Bannan line increased from three trains and six trains to four trains and eight trains, helping reduce headways on the Bannan Line from 4 minutes to 3 minutes and 20 seconds on average.

== Design ==
The design of the C341 train is very similar to the earlier C321 trains. However, upon closer inspection, there are several subtle differences with the car body, detrainment door, gangways and windows. Most notably, the trains initially did not have side LED destination displays or line colour indicators as they could not be installed during the warranty period. Such passenger information displays have however since been retrofitted. The interior design is very similar to the C321 trains. Unlike the C321, the second digit in the carriage numbers of the C341 is a 2, not a 1.

Another current notable difference between the C341 and C321 is the traction inverters for the AC motors, i.e. the C341 uses IGBT–VVVF inverters for its AC motors instead of C321's GTO–VVVF inverters. As the C341 trains have been in service for nearly 20 years, the TRTC announced the tender for the first time to propose a traction system replacement together with the C321 in February 2021. The bid opened on 10 May 2021 and on 30 July 2021, TRSC won the contract to do so. Following the Red line C301's traction system replacement, this will be Taipei Metro's third traction system replacement.

== Trains ==
A complete six-car trainset consists of an identical twin set of one driving motor car (DM1), one trailer car (T) and one intermediate motor car (M2) permanently coupled together. The configuration of a C341 trainset in revenue service is DM1–T–M2–M2–T–DM1.

Each car is assigned its own four-digit serial number, which ranges from x201 to x212.

- The first digit (the 'x' above) indicates the position of the car. Hence, DM1 cars use the number x=1, T cars x=2, and M2 cars x=3
- The other three digits are the identification number of the train the car is part of. A full-length train of six cars consists of two identification numbers, one for the first three cars, and another for the second three. The bigger number is always equal to the smaller number plus one, and the smaller number is always an odd number. For example, a train of six cars would have serial numbers 1201, 2201, 3201, 3202, 2202, and 1202, respectively.

== See also ==
- Taipei Metro VAL256
- Taipei Metro C301
- Taipei Metro C321
- Taipei Metro C371
- Taipei Metro BT370
- Taipei Metro C381
