= Kawasaki Railcar Manufacturing =

Japanese rolling stock manufacturer

- Native name: 川崎車両株式会社
- Romanized name: Kawasaki Sharyō kabushiki gaisha
- Type: Subsidiary
- Industry: Rolling stock manufacturing
- Founded: 1906
- Headquarters: Hyōgo-ku, Kobe, Japan
- Products: Electric trains (including Shinkansen trains); Monorails; Passenger coaches and freight cars; Diesel locomotives; Electric locomotives; Platform screen door systems; Passenger coaches and freight cars integrated transit systems
- Parent: Kawasaki Heavy Industries
- Website: www.khi.co.jp/english/index.html kawasaki.com

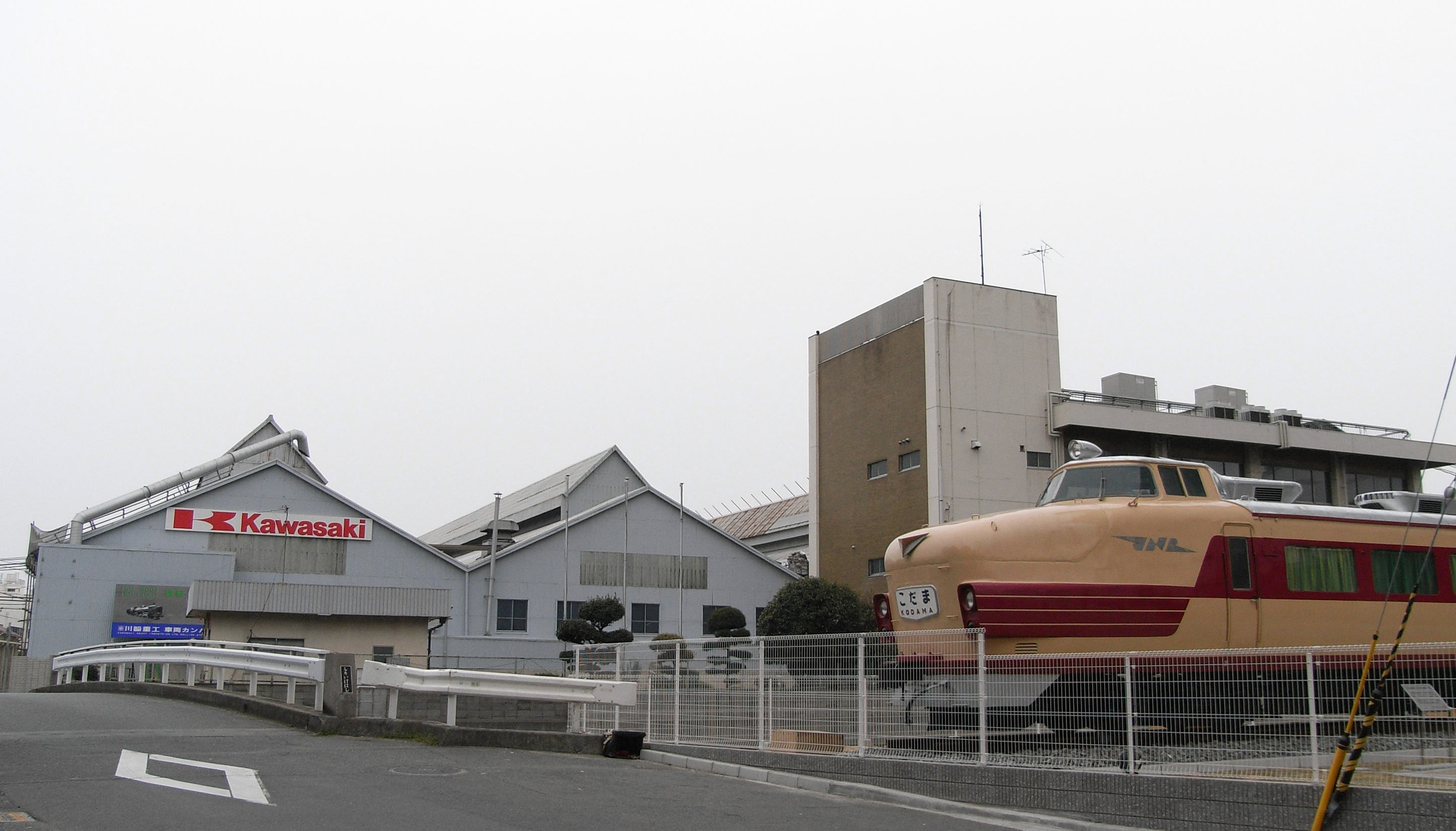
The Kawasaki Heavy Industries factory in Hyōgo Prefecture, Japan (April 2007)

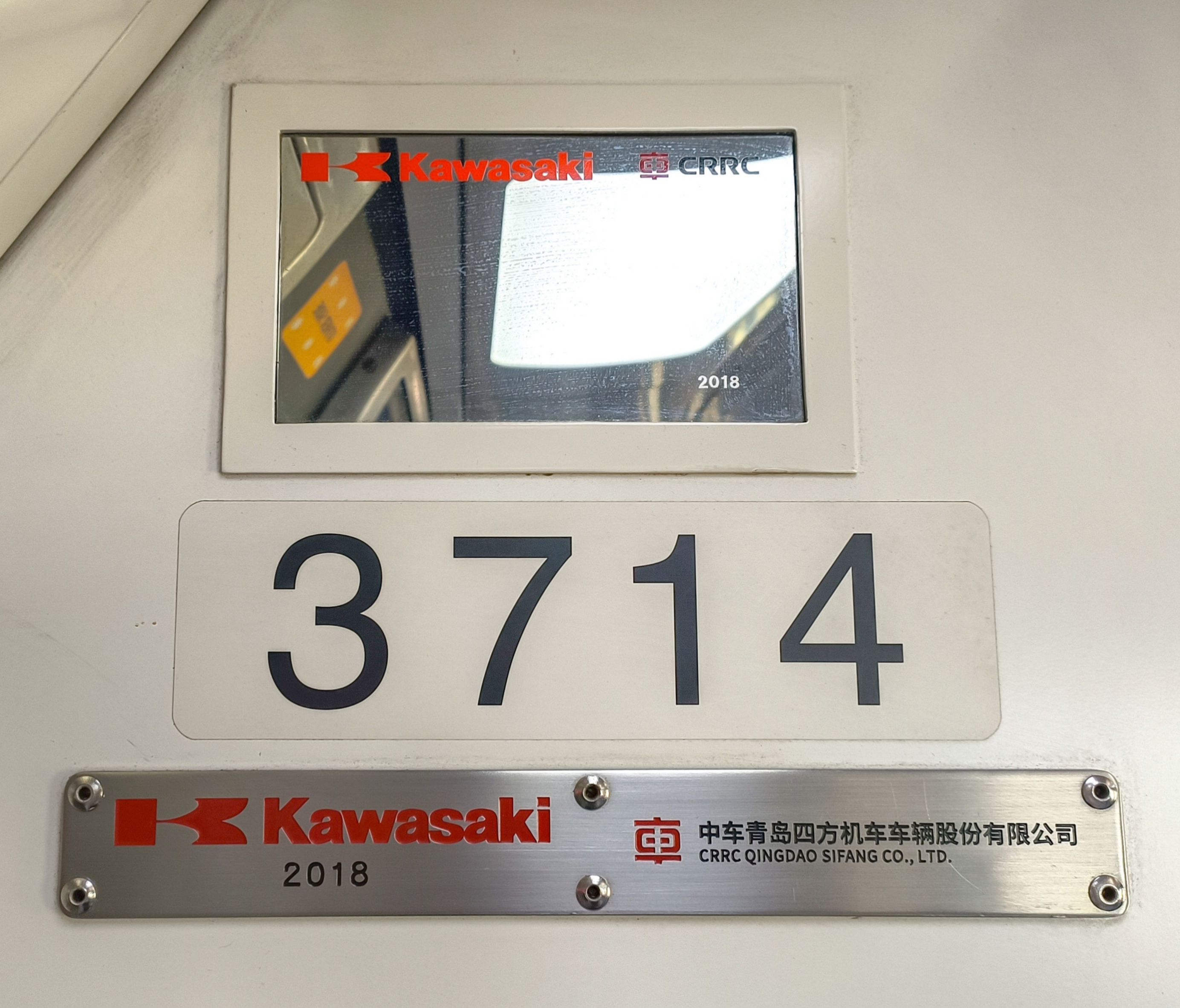
2018 Kawasaki-CRRC Qingdao Sifang builder plate on a Kawasaki & CRRC Qingdao Sifang train from (Singapore MRT)

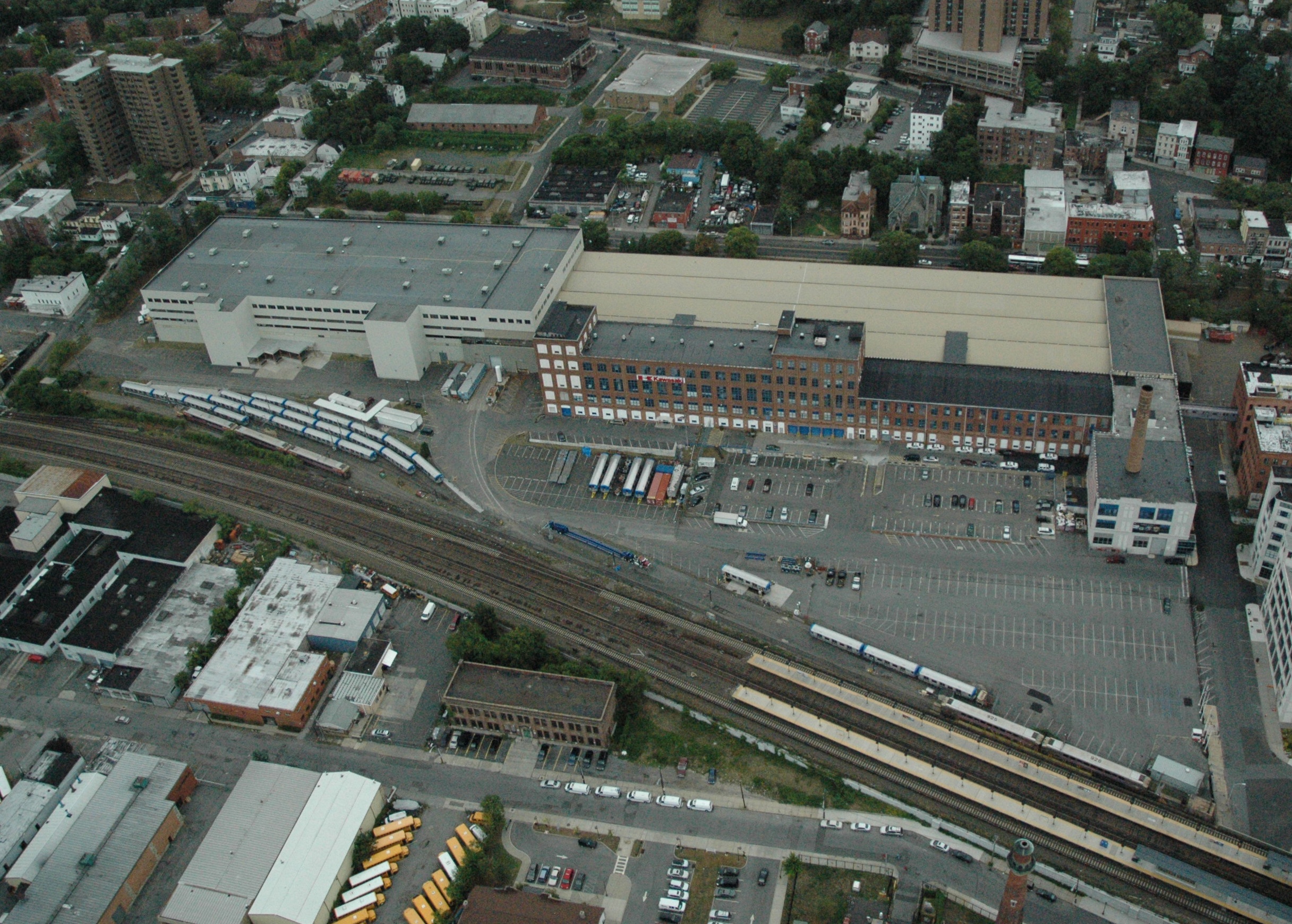
Aerial view of the Kawasaki Rail Plant in Yonkers, New York, USA (May 2011)

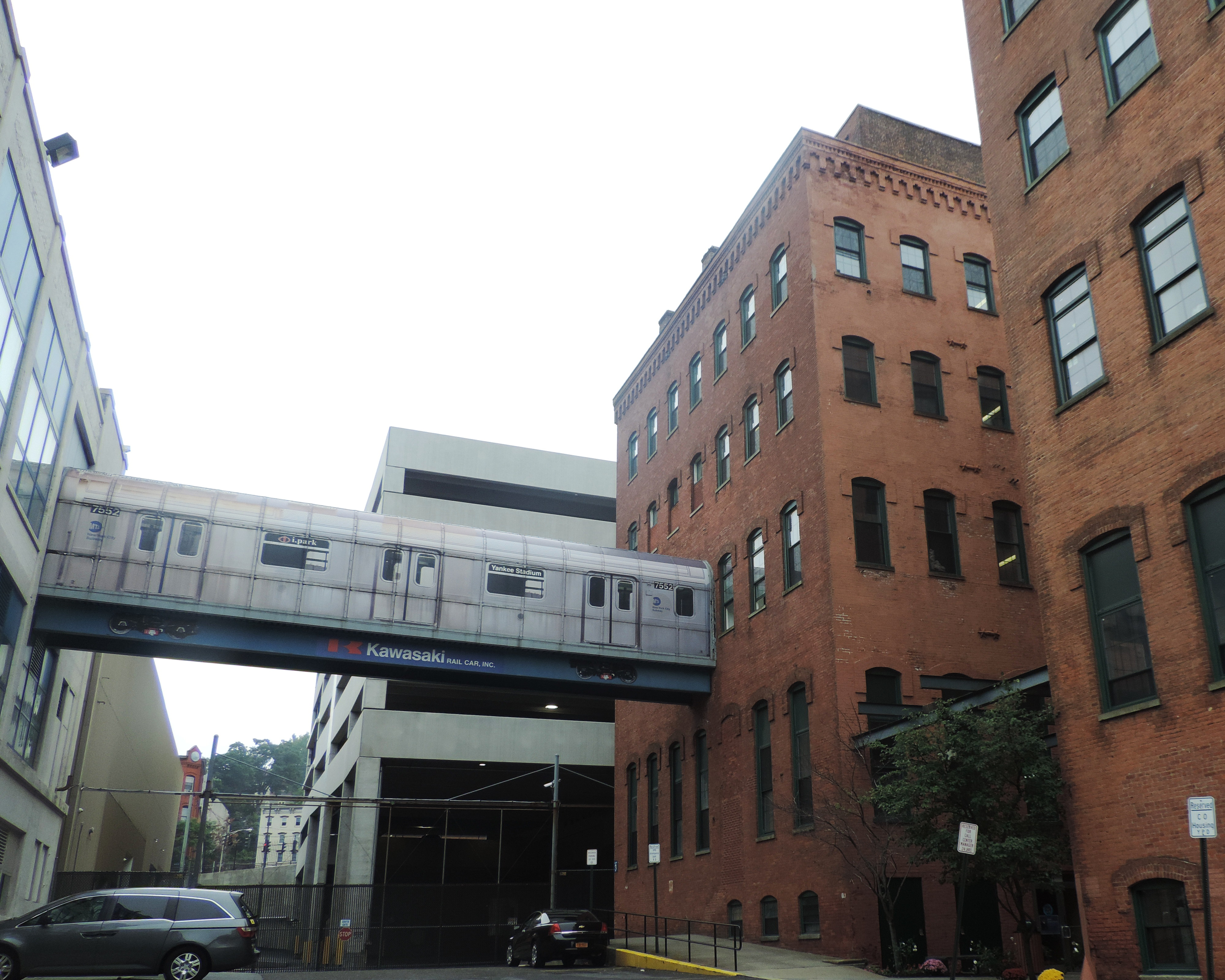
The Yonkers, USA factory in September 2014

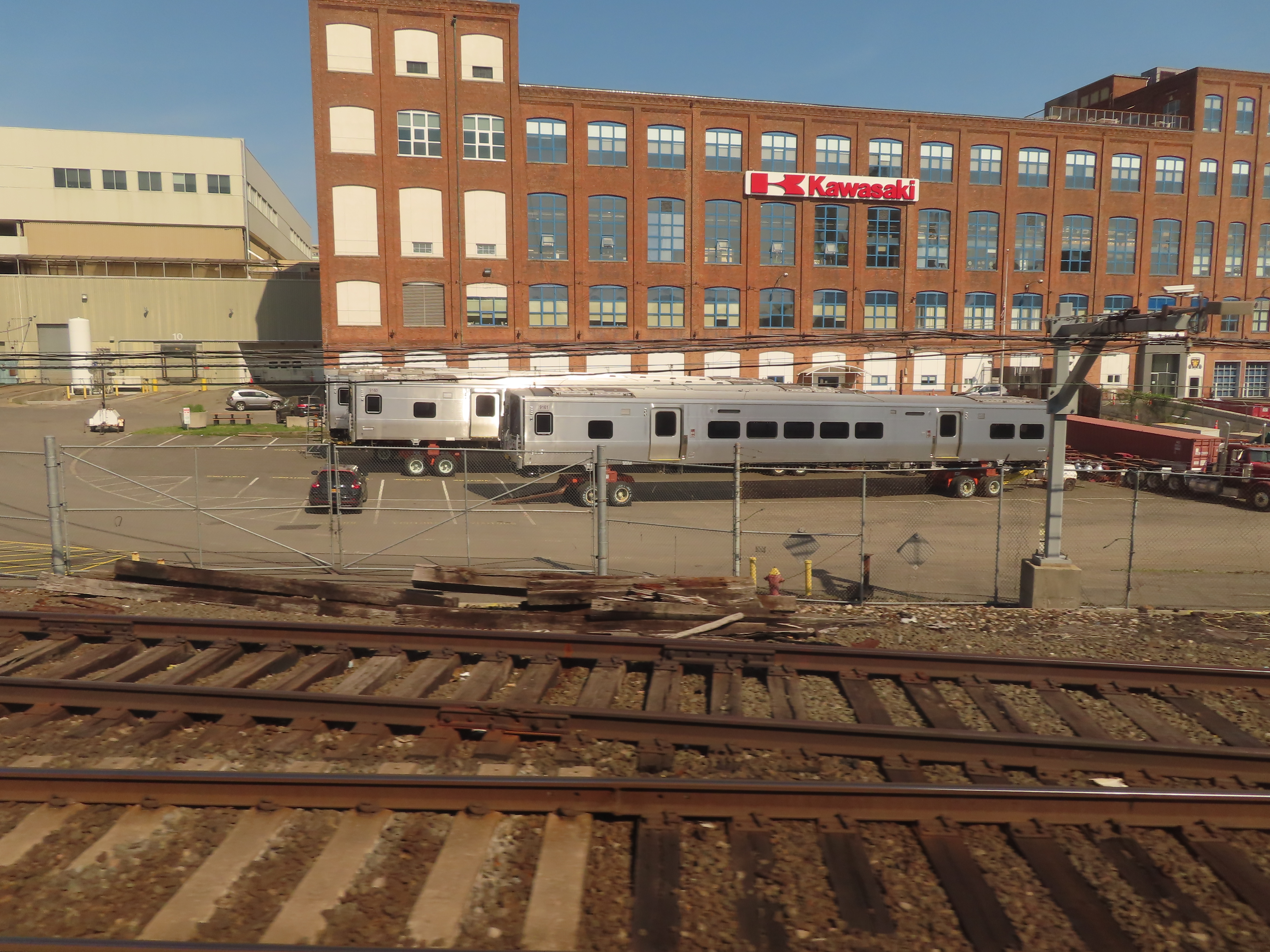
Completed M9 bodyshells at the Yonkers factory in May 2021

The Kawasaki Railcar Manufacturing Company (川崎車両, Kawasaki Sharyō) is the Japanese rolling stock manufacturing subsidiary of Kawasaki Heavy Industries. Since beginning operations in 1906, the company has produced more than 90,000 railroad cars.

== Products ==
As indicated by the company name, the company mainly produces railroad vehicles. Since the early-1980s, Kawasaki has received orders from customers in foreign countries, including the Republic of Ireland, Bangladesh and the United States. All products manufactured for the US rail market are sold through Kawasaki Rail Car Inc., another division of Kawasaki Heavy Industries. An assembly plant in Lincoln, Nebraska produces fully completed cars and "knocked down" cars. Because of substantial sales to the New York City Subway and various commuter lines, an additional assembly plant was established in Yonkers, New York, in 1986 for final assembly of cars built in Lincoln, at the site of a former Otis Elevator Company factory. The rolling stock of the Dhaka Metro Rail's first line, MRT Line-6, is made by Kawasaki.

In November 2020, Kawasaki Heavy Industries announced that it would spin off some of its businesses, including the rolling stock division from October 2021.

=== Japan Railways Group ===
Products produced for the Japan Railways Group, or JR Group, include:

- Shinkansen: All types except N700A series, N700S series and 800 series
- JR / JNR local lines:
  - Former JNR: 103 series, 201 series, 203 series, 207-900 series, 211 series EMUs
  - JR Central: 311 series, 371 series, 383 series EMUs
  - JR East: 651 series, 209 series, E231 series, E233 series, E331 series, E501 series, E531 series, 701 series, E721 series EMUs
  - JR Hokkaido: 721 series, 731 series, 785 series, 789 series EMUs
  - JR West: 281 series, 283 series, 285 series, 287 series, 681 series, 683 series, 207 series, 323 series, 223 series, 225 series, 227 series, 521 series, 125 series EMUs, 87 series (KiSaINe 86 type Sleeping cars) Hybrid MU
  - JR Shikoku: 5000 series (5000 type cab cars, 5200 type intermediate cars), 8600 series EMUs, 2600 series, 2700 series DMUs
  - JR Kyushu: JR Kyushu Class DF200-7000 diesel locomotive, YC1 series Hybrid MU
  - JR Freight: JR Freight Class EF510 electric locomotives, JR Freight Class DF200 diesel locomotives
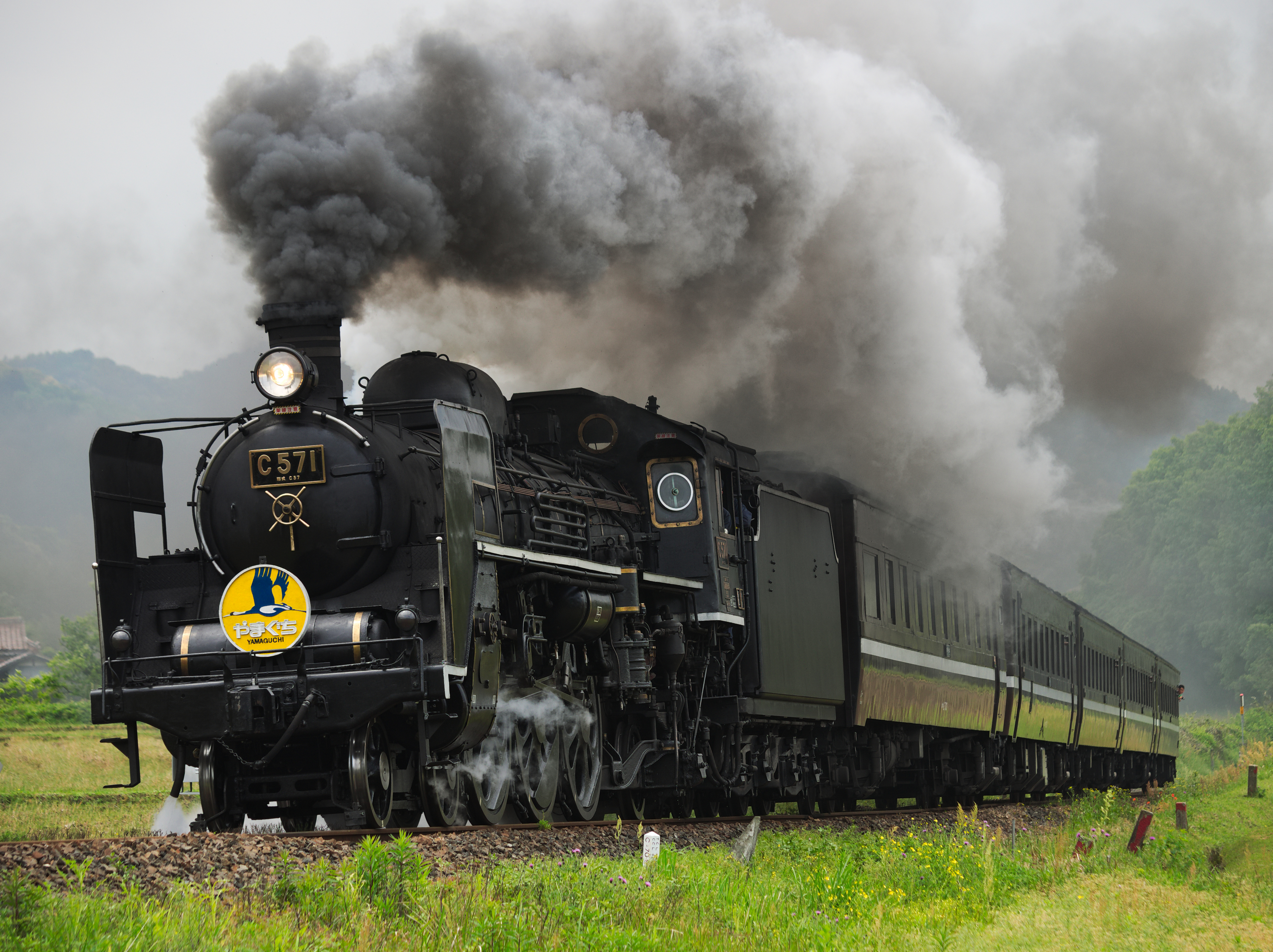
JNR class C57 steam locomotive

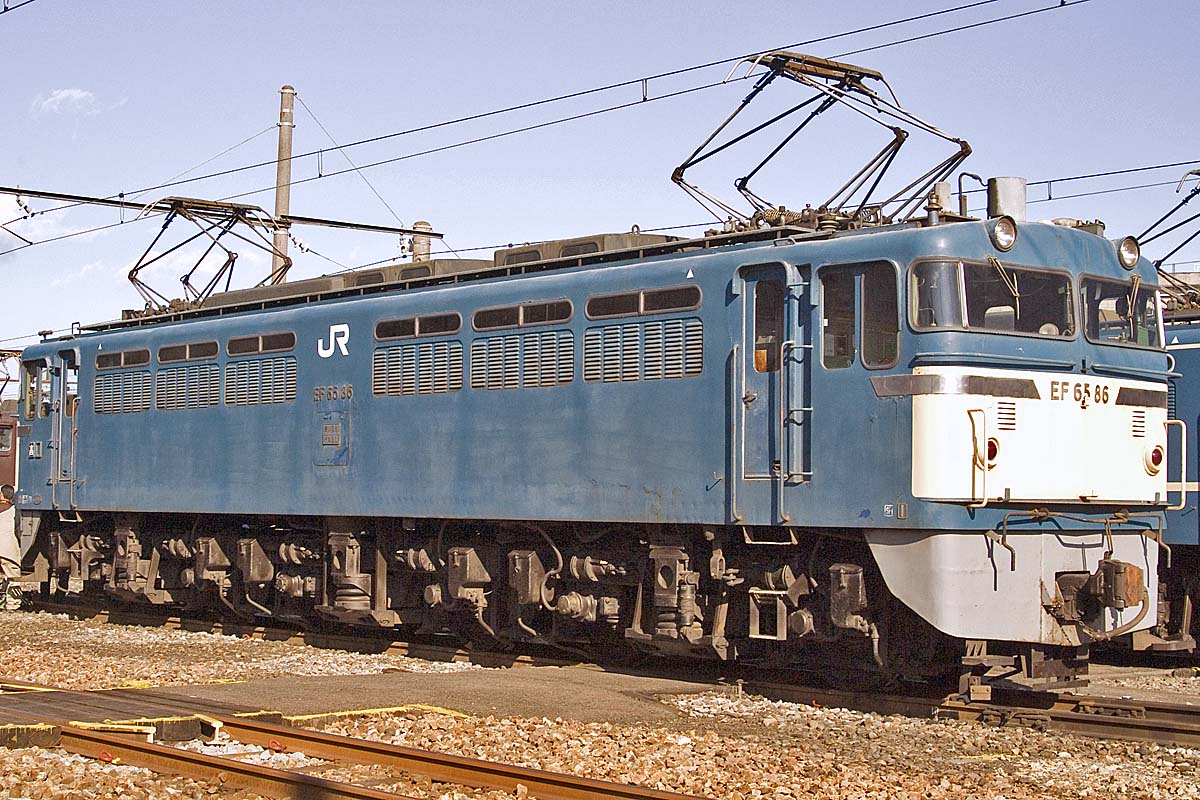
JNR class EF65 locomotive

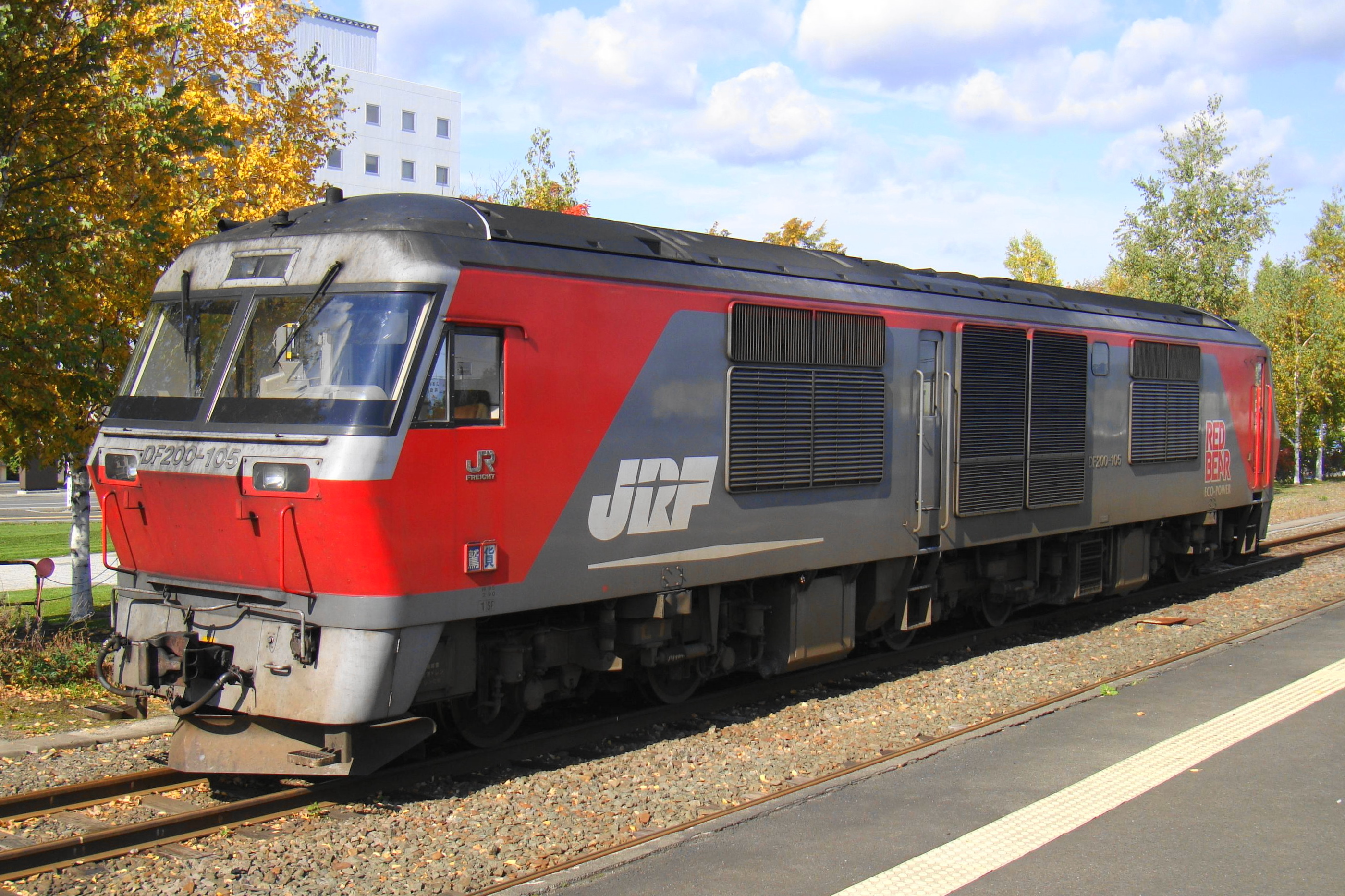
class DF200 diesel locomotive

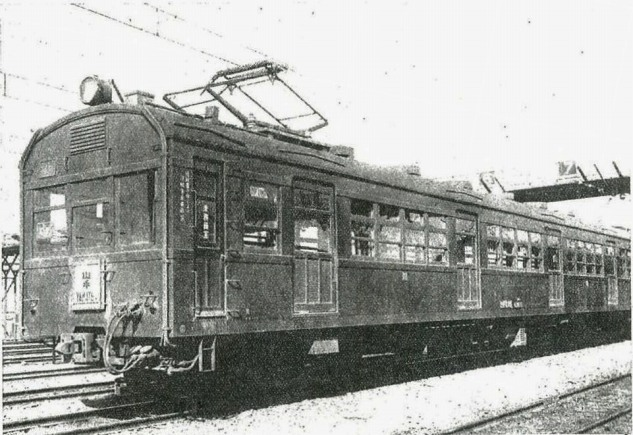
JNR 63 series EMU

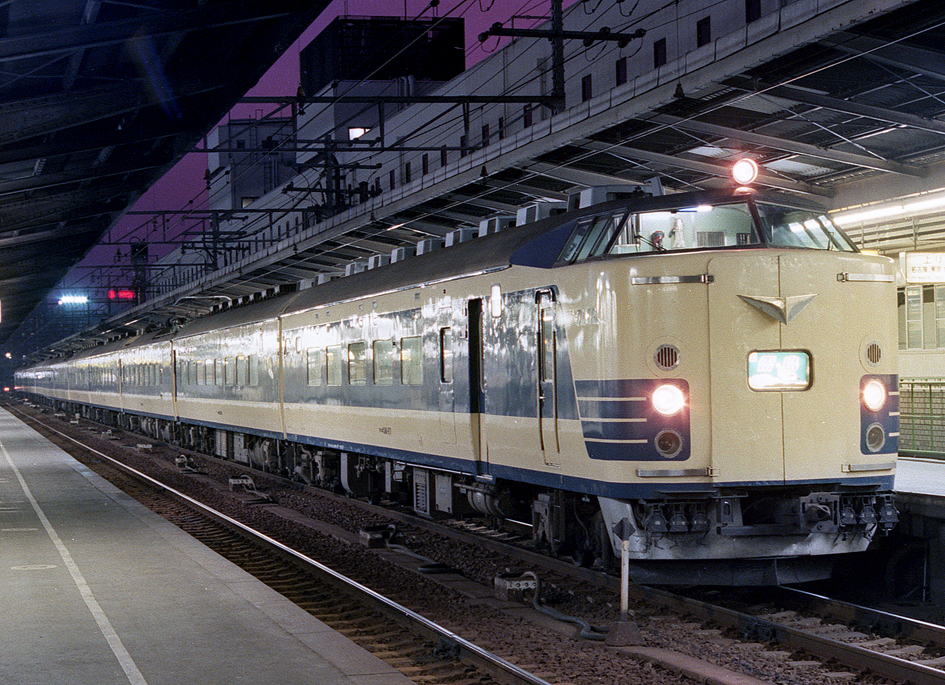
JNR 583 series sleeping EMU

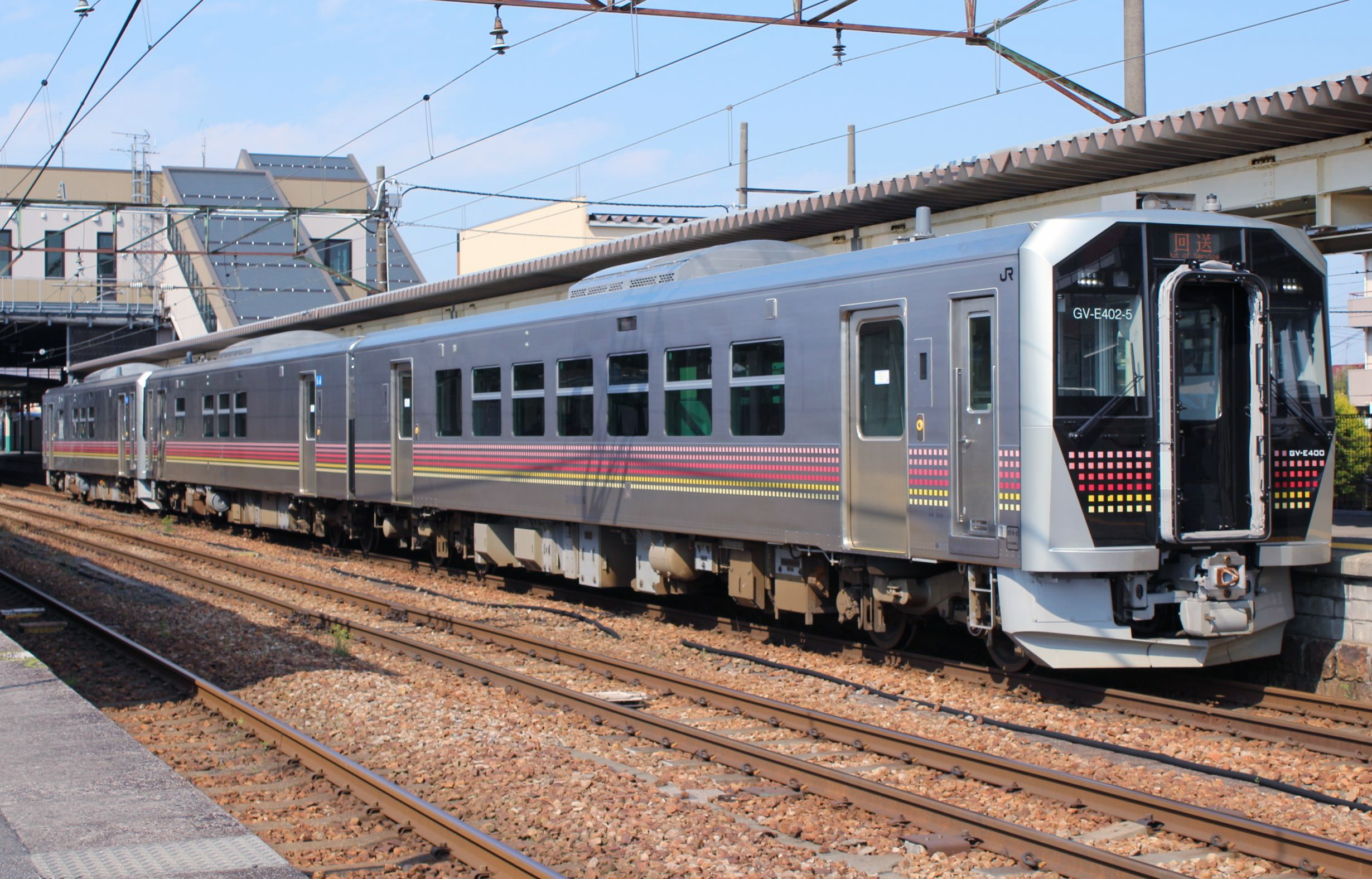
GV-E400 series DMU

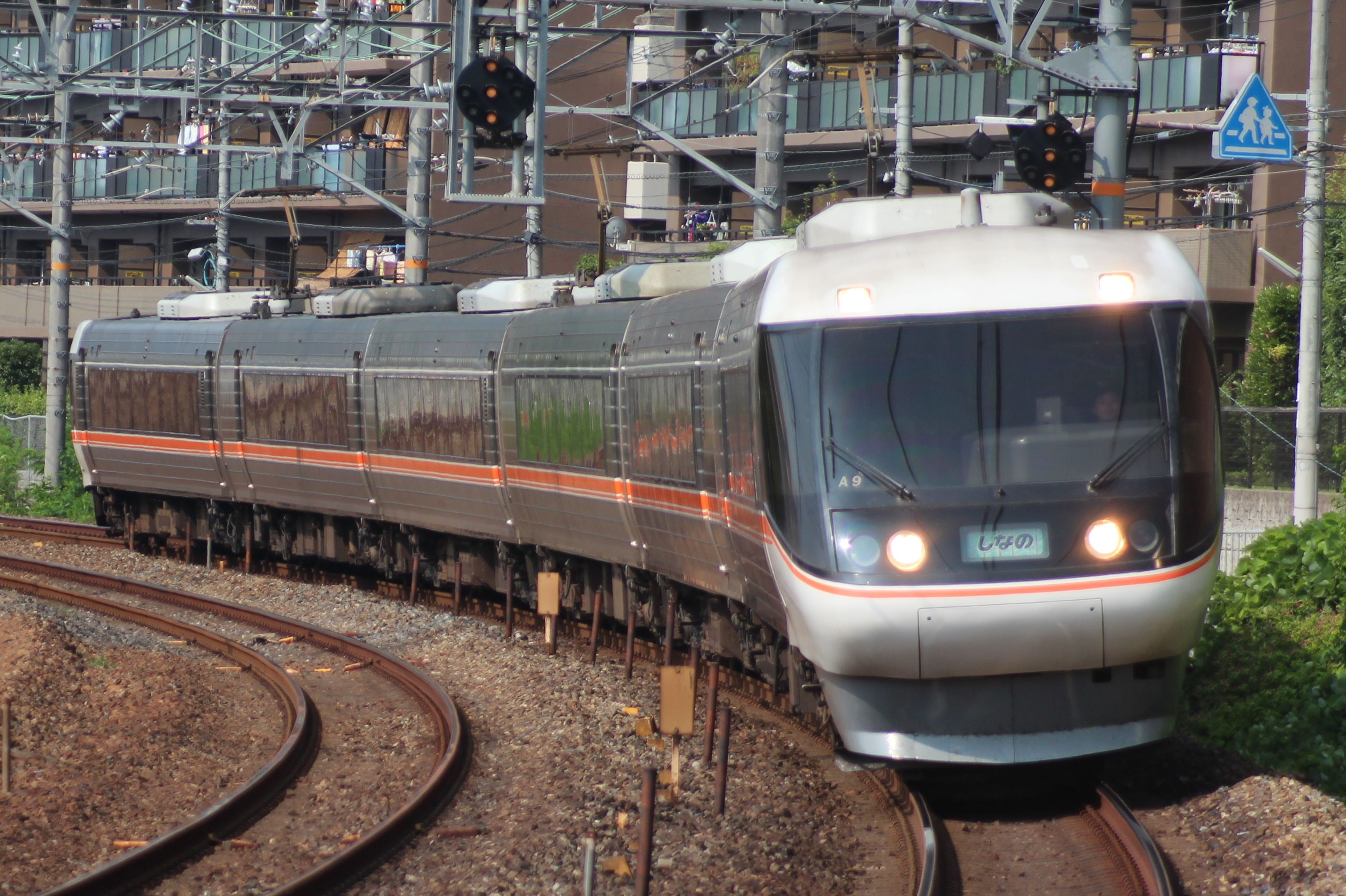
383 series tilting EMU

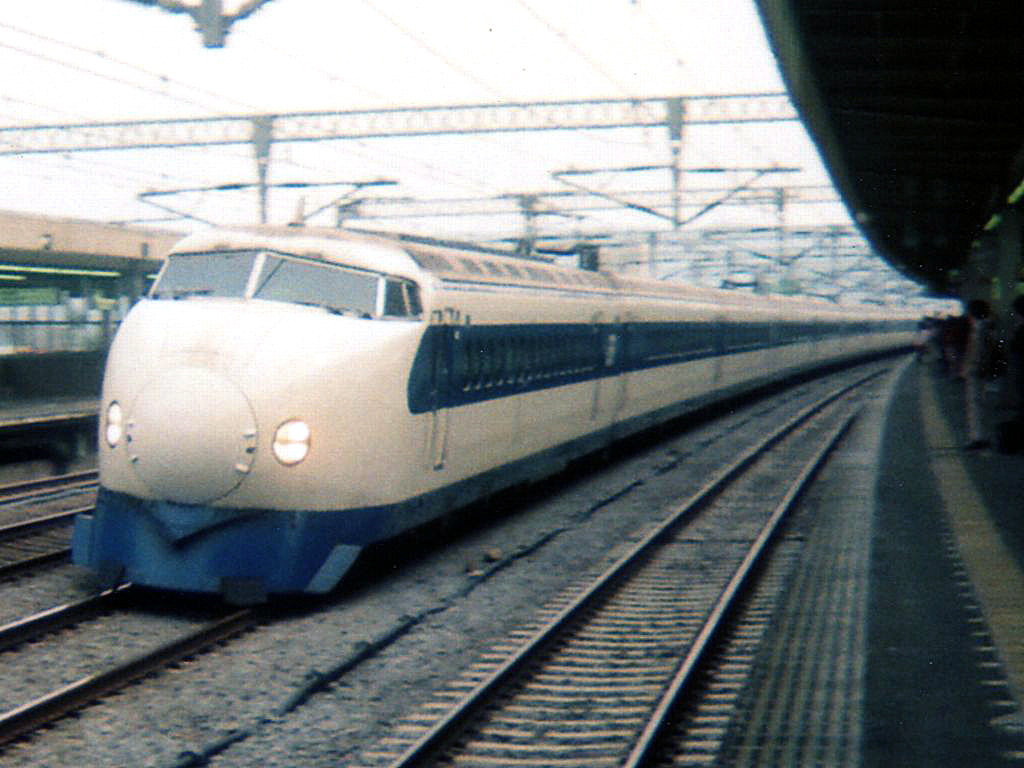
0 series shinkansen

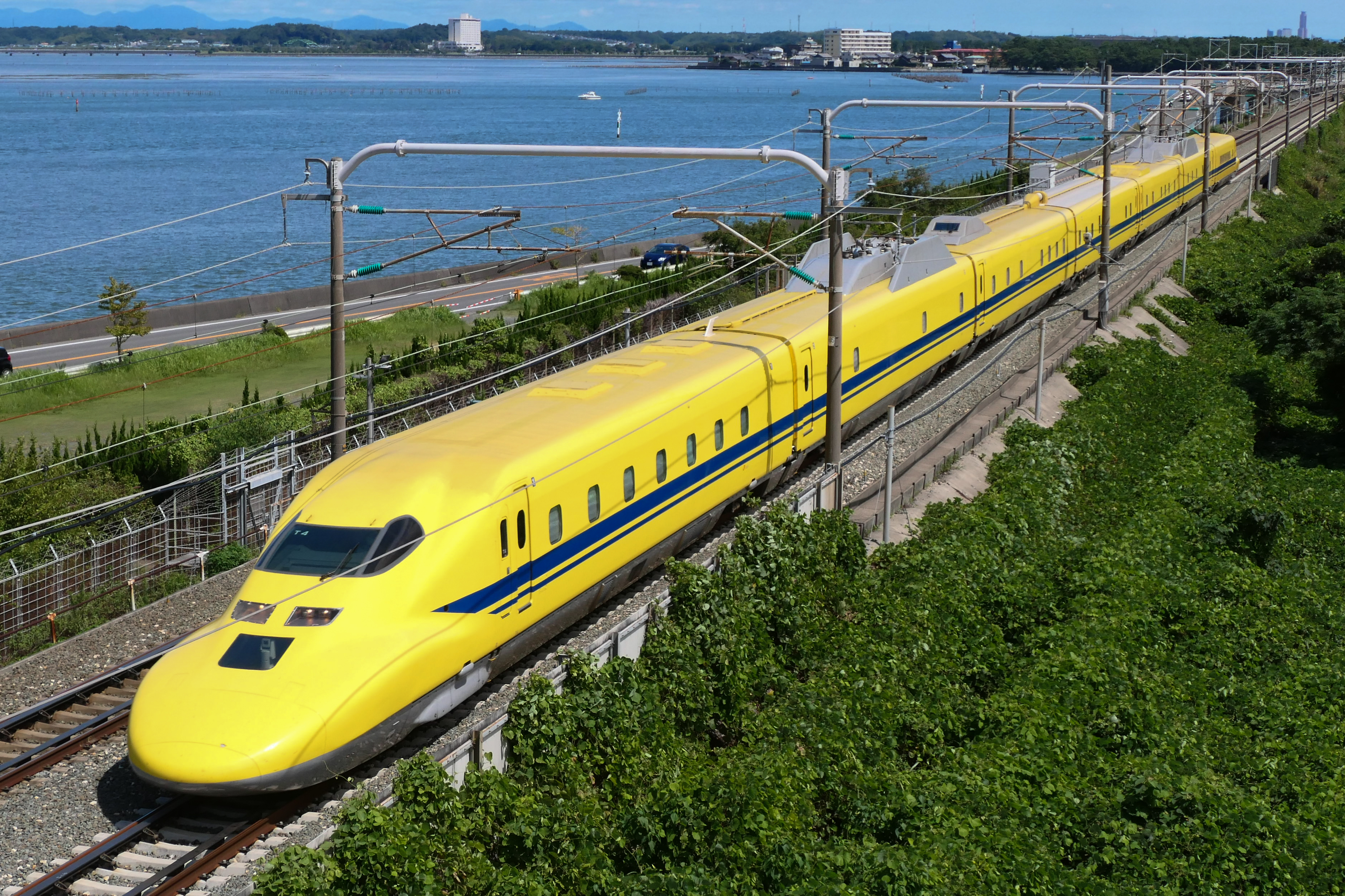
Doctor Yellow Shinkansen

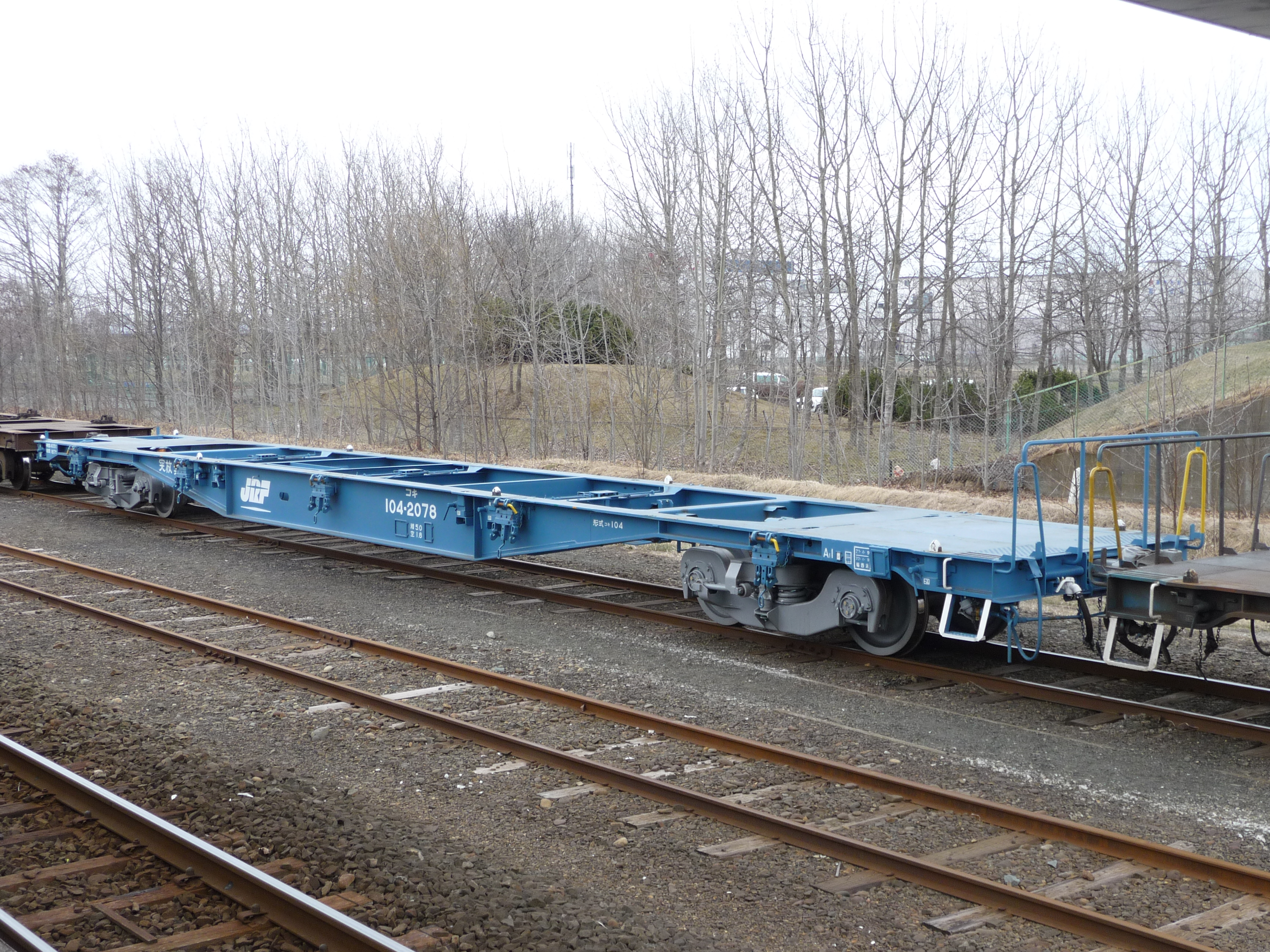
container carrier car koki104

=== Major private railway corporation ===
Production for the following private railways include:

- Hanshin Electric Railway
- Keihan Electric Railway
- Keihin Electric Express Railway
- Nishi-Nippon Railroad
- Odakyu Electric Railway
- Tokyo Metro
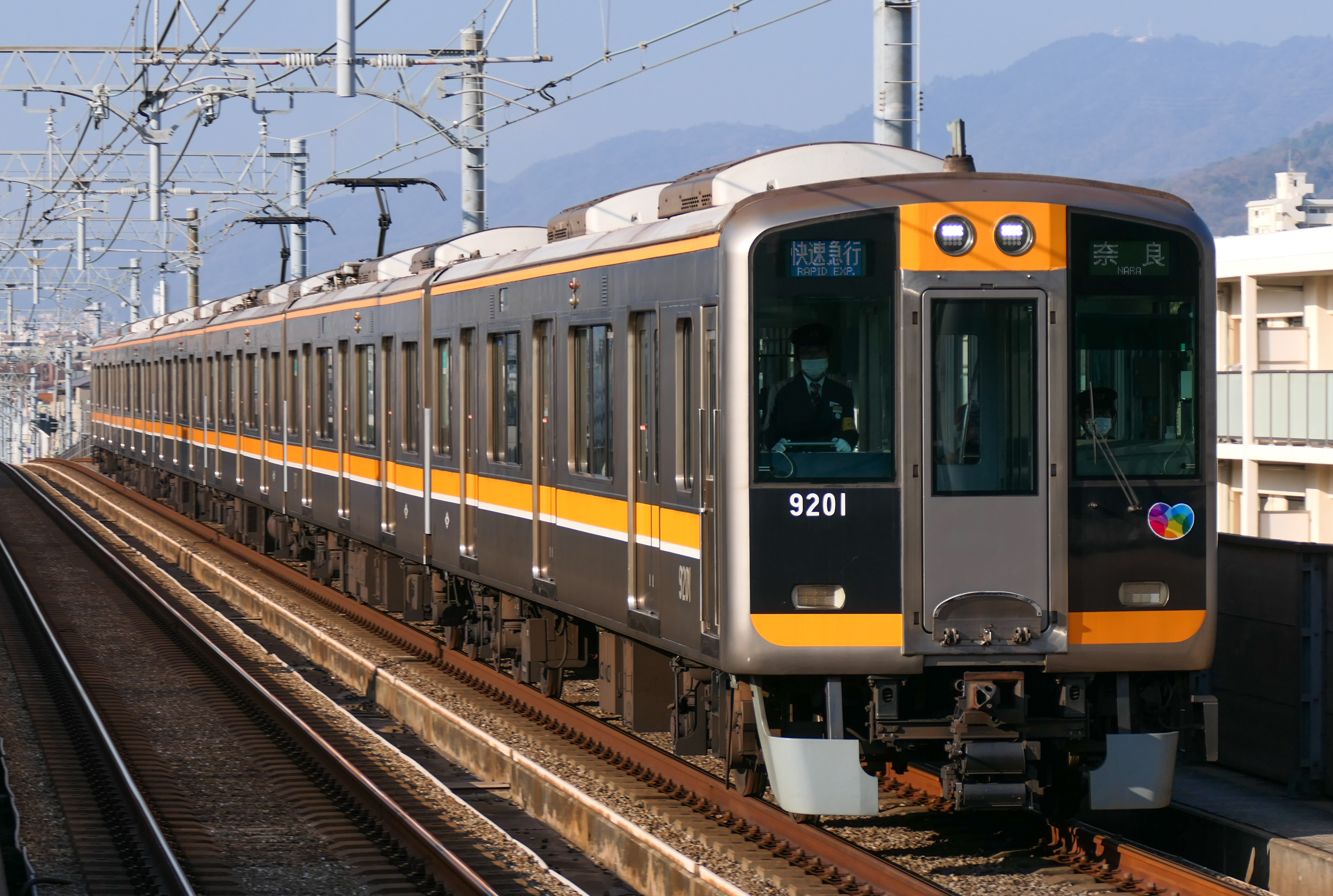
Hanshin Electric 9000 series EMU

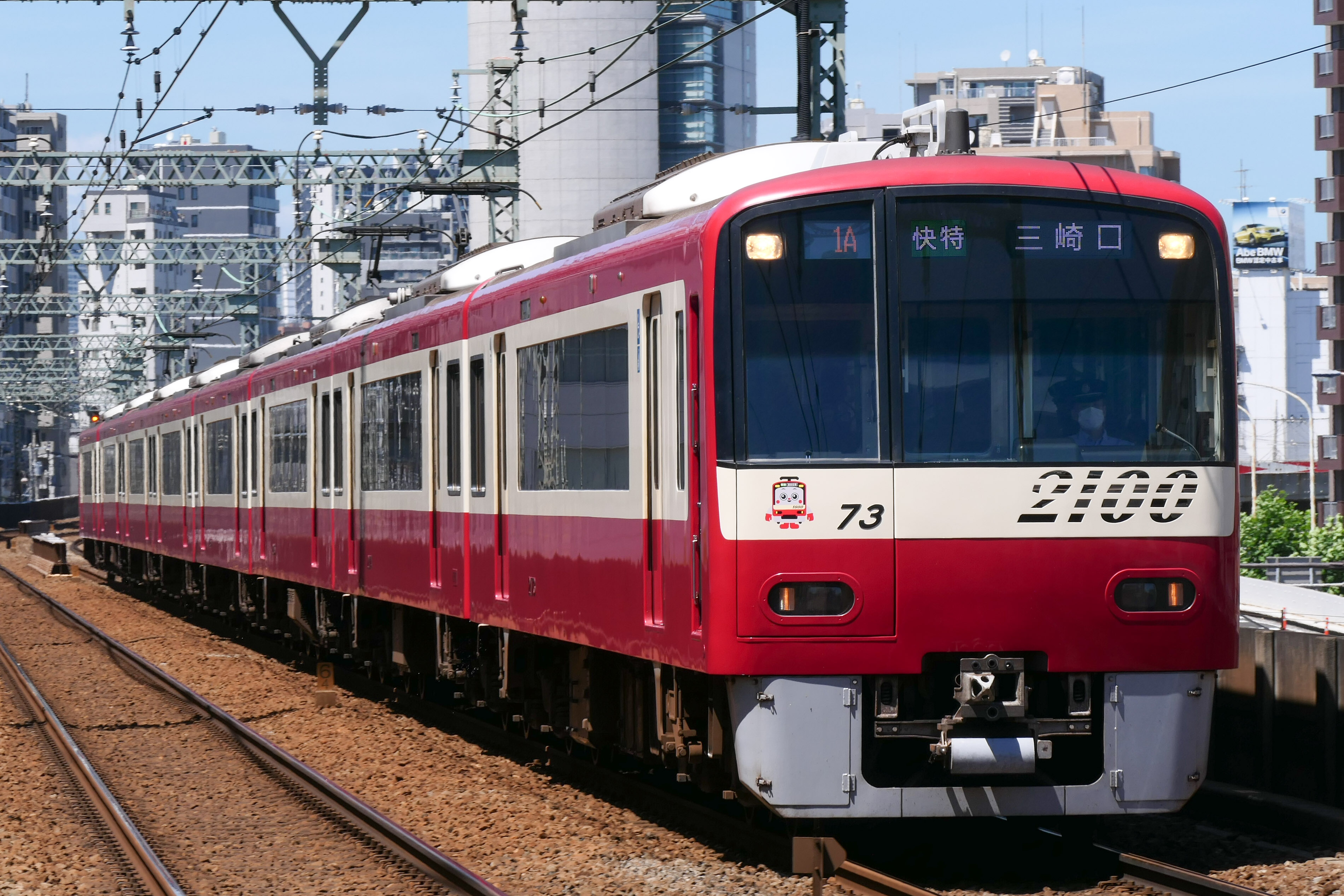
Keihin Electric Railway (Keikyu) 2100 series

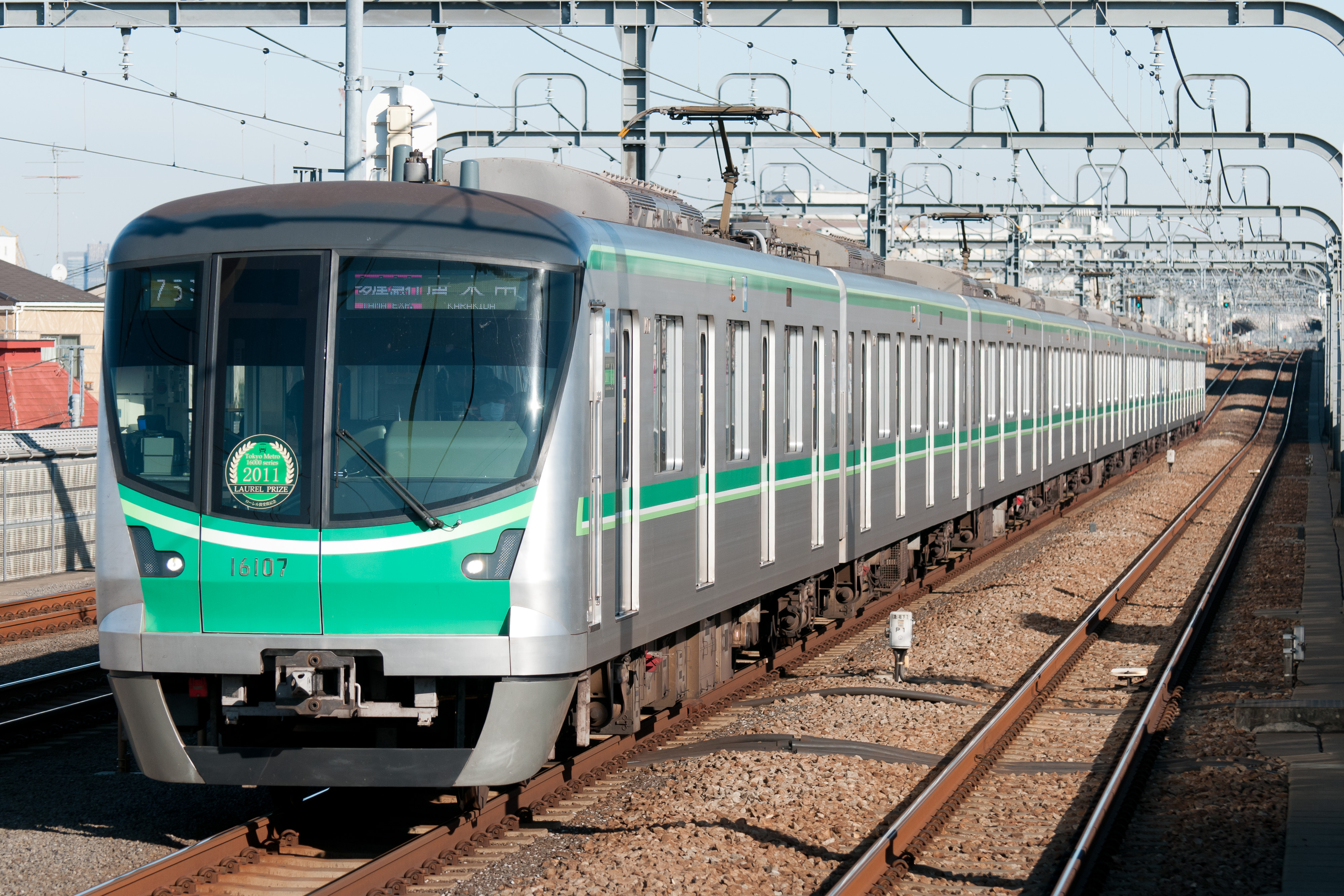
Tokyo Metro 16000 series EMU

=== Other railway companies in Japan ===
- Hokushin Kyuko Electric Railway (All cars)
- Kobe Electric Railway (All cars)
- Metropolitan Intercity Railway Company (All cars)
- Saitama Railway
- Sanyo Electric Railway (All cars)
- Semboku Rapid Railway
- Tokyo Waterfront Area Rapid Transit (All cars)
- Osaka Metro (30000 series)

=== Public transportation bureaus ===
- Fukuoka City Transportation Bureau
- Kobe Municipal Transportation Bureau (All cars)
- Osaka Municipal Transportation Bureau
- Sapporo City Transportation Bureau (All subways, some tramways)
- Sendai City Transportation Bureau
- Tokyo Metropolitan Bureau of Transportation
- Yokohama City Transportation Bureau
  - 4000 series
  - 10000 series
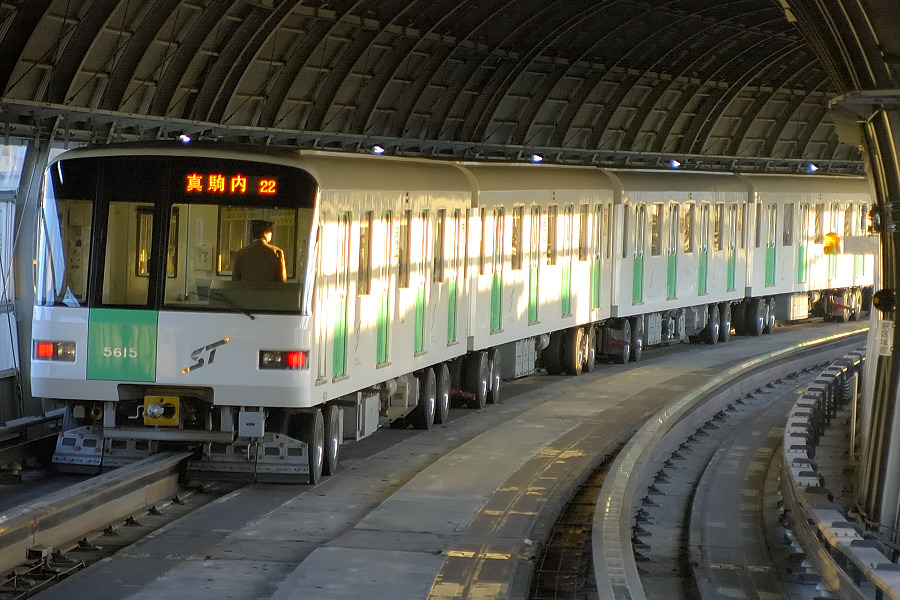
Sapporo Municipal Subway

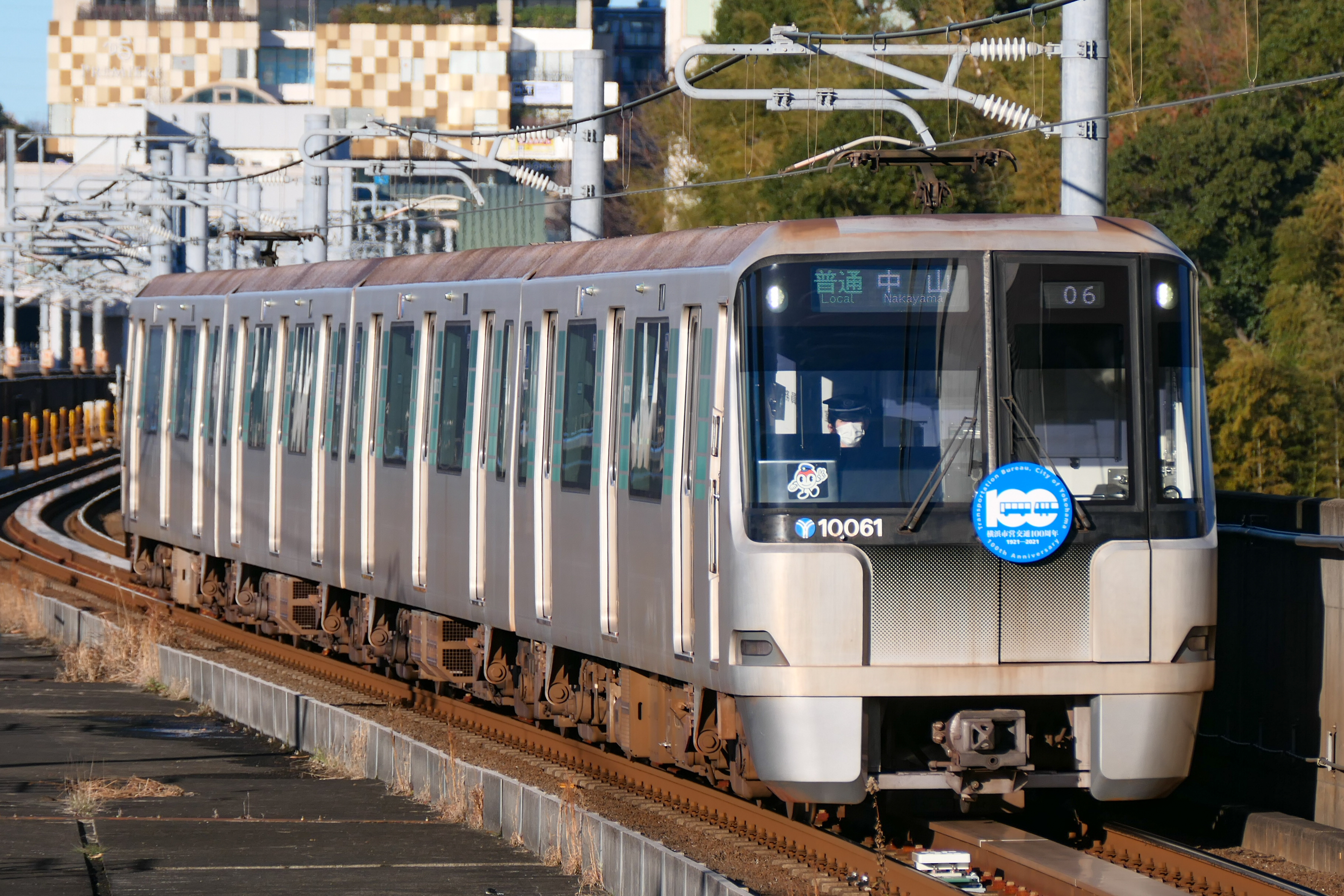
Yokohama Municipal Subway

=== Monorails & AGTs ===
Production for Monorails and Automated guideway transits (AGT) include:

- Hiroshima Rapid Transit
- Kobe New Transit (All cars)
- Kitakyushu Urban Monorail
- Okinawa Urban Monorail
- Osaka Monorail
- Saitama New Urban Transit
- Tama Toshi Monorail

=== Overseas clients ===
- Dhaka Metro Rail – Green Train
- Chinese Ministry of Railways – Type 6K, Type CRH2
- Hong Kong MTR – SP1900 EMU
- Hong Kong MTR Light Rail – Phase II LRV power cabs/trailers
- Long Island Rail Road – C-3 bilevel cars, M9/M9A cars
- MARC – MARC III bilevel commuter cars (ex-VRE C Cars refurbished by Bombardier Transportation)
- Massachusetts Bay Transportation Authority MBTA Commuter Rail – BTC-4, CTC-4, BTC-4A/4B/4C bi-level commuter cars
- New York City Subway – R62, R68A, R110A, R142A, R143, R160B, R188, R211 and R268 cars
- Metro-North Railroad – M8, M9/M9A cars
- PATH – PA4 and PA5 cars
- Panama Canal Authority – Towing locomotives along with Toyo Denki Seizo K.K. and Mitsubishi Heavy Industries
- Singapore Mass Rapid Transit (MRT) – C151 with Kinki Sharyo, Tokyu Car Corporation and Nippon Sharyo, C751B with Nippon Sharyo, C151A, C151B, C151C and T251 with CRRC Qingdao Sifang
- Keretapi Tanah Melayu – Class 24 Diesel-electric locomotives with Toshiba Corporation
- Korail – Korail Class 1000
- SEPTA – Broad Street subway Class B-IV cars; LRV K Series 9000 and 100 subway–surface / suburban trolleys
- Taipei Metro – C301 with Union Rail Car Partnership, C371 and C381 with Taiwan Rolling Stock Company
- Taoyuan Airport MRT – commuter trains with Taiwan Rolling Stock Company, express trains
- Taichung MRT – Green line EMU with Taiwan Rolling Stock Company
- Taiwan High Speed Rail – 700T
- Virginia Railway Express – C Car bilevel commuter cars, since sold to MARC Train
- Washington Metro – 7000 series cars
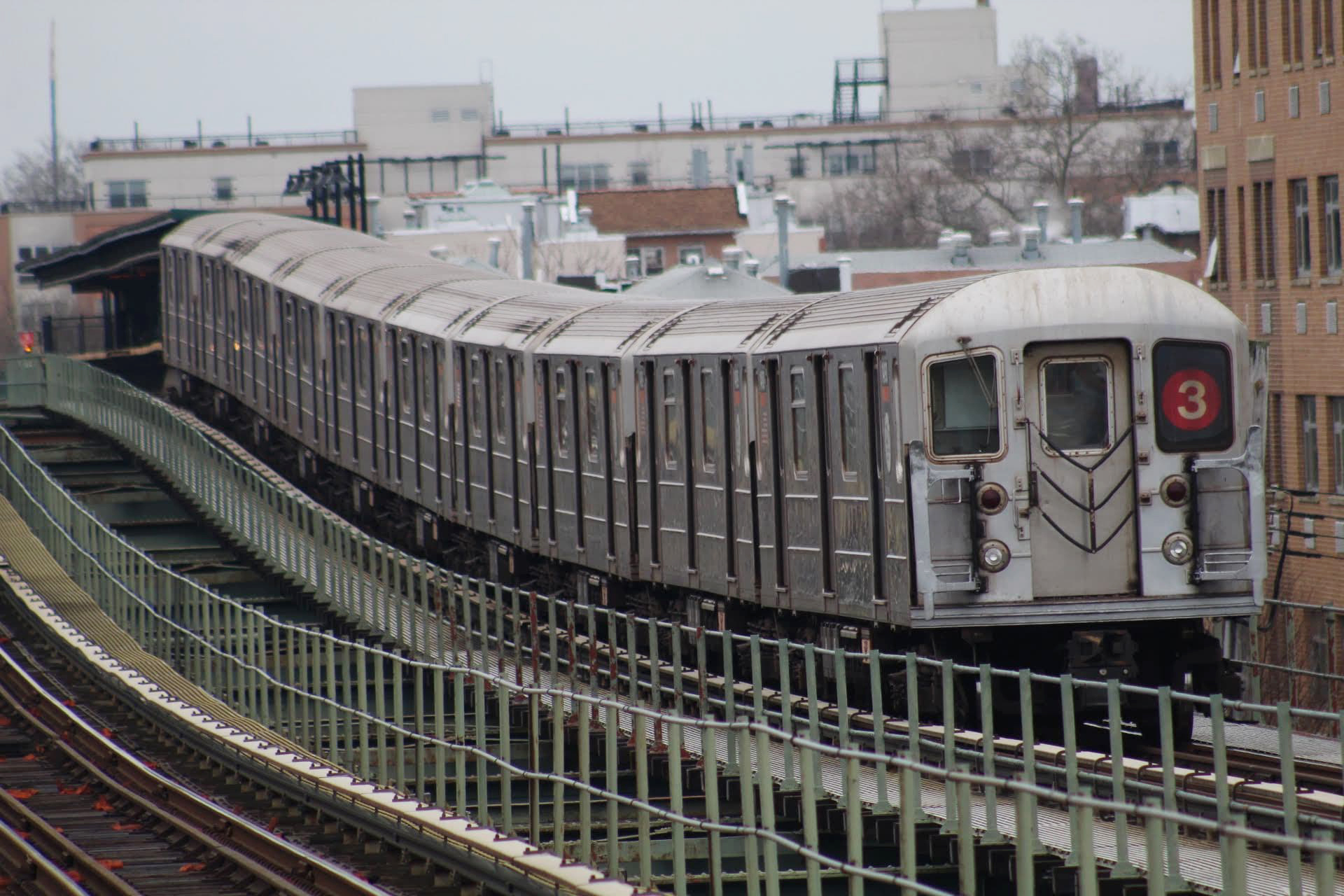
A train of Kawasaki R62 subway cars on the 3 service of the New York City Subway

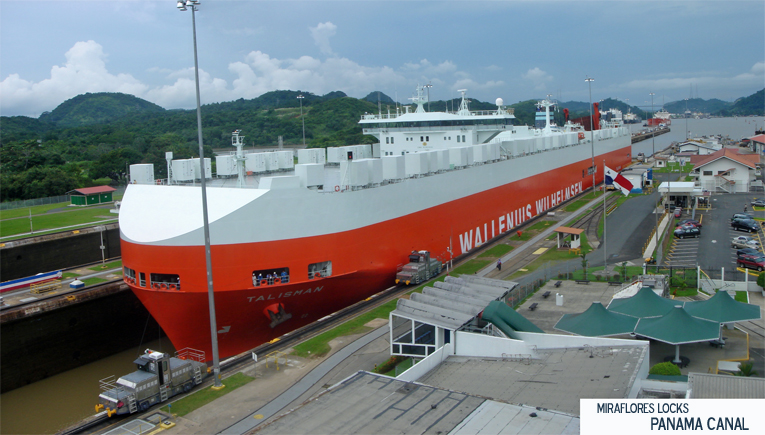
Towing locomotives at Panama Canal

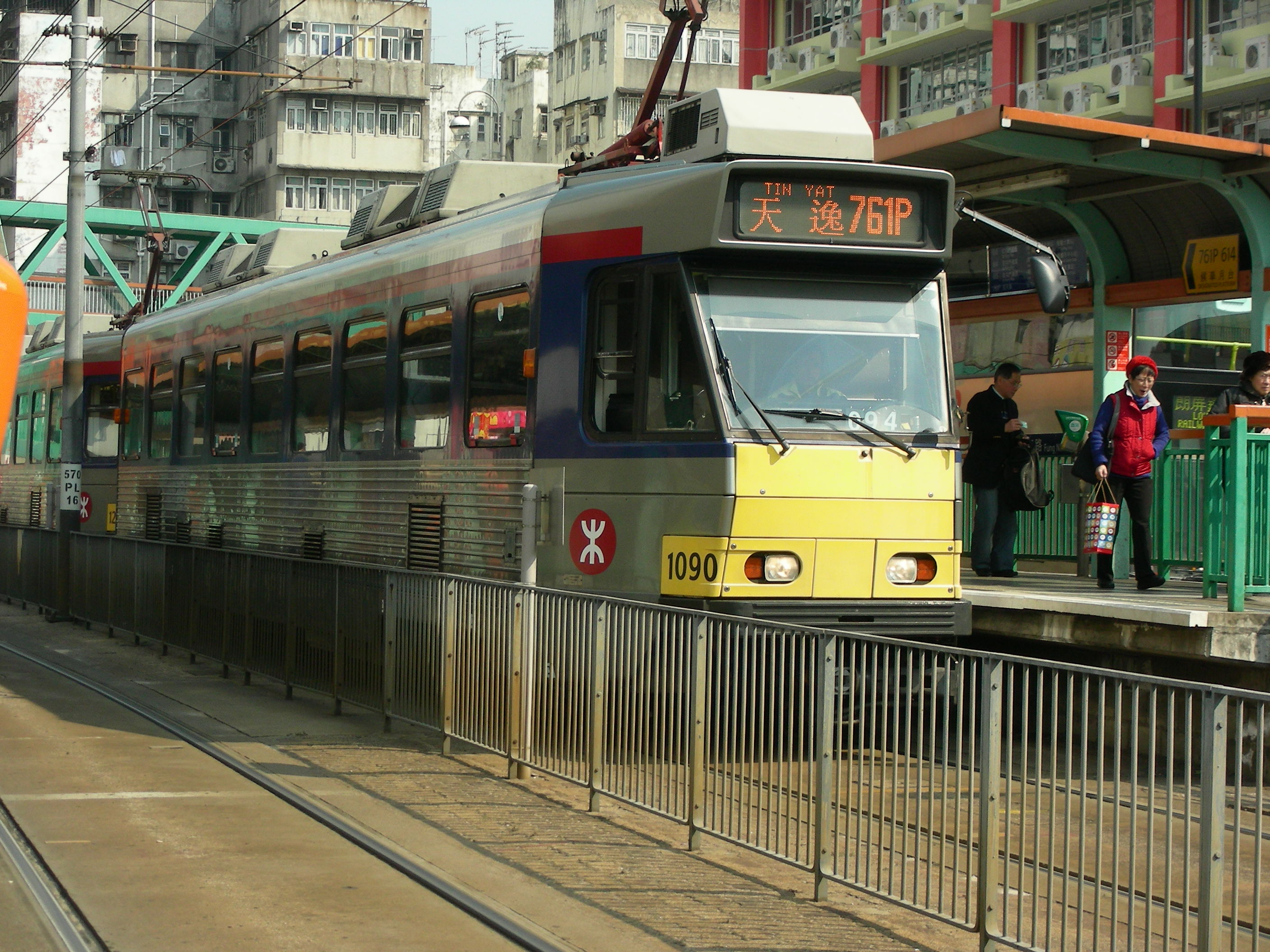
Hong Kong Light Rail Phase II LRV cab car and trailer

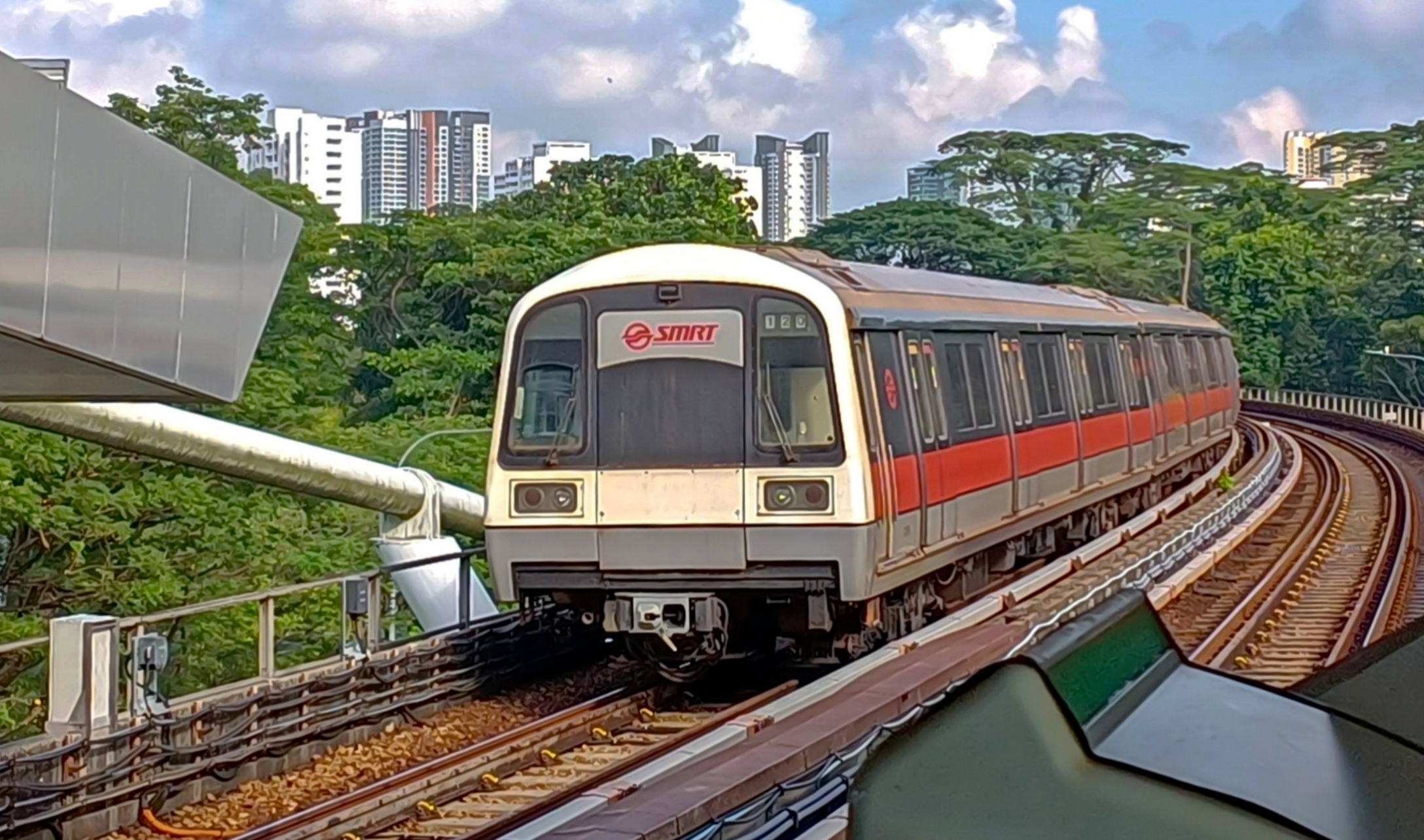
Kawasaki Heavy Industries C151 Train Singapore MRT

Kawasaki Heavy Industries & CRRC Qingdao Sifang C151B Train Singapore MRT

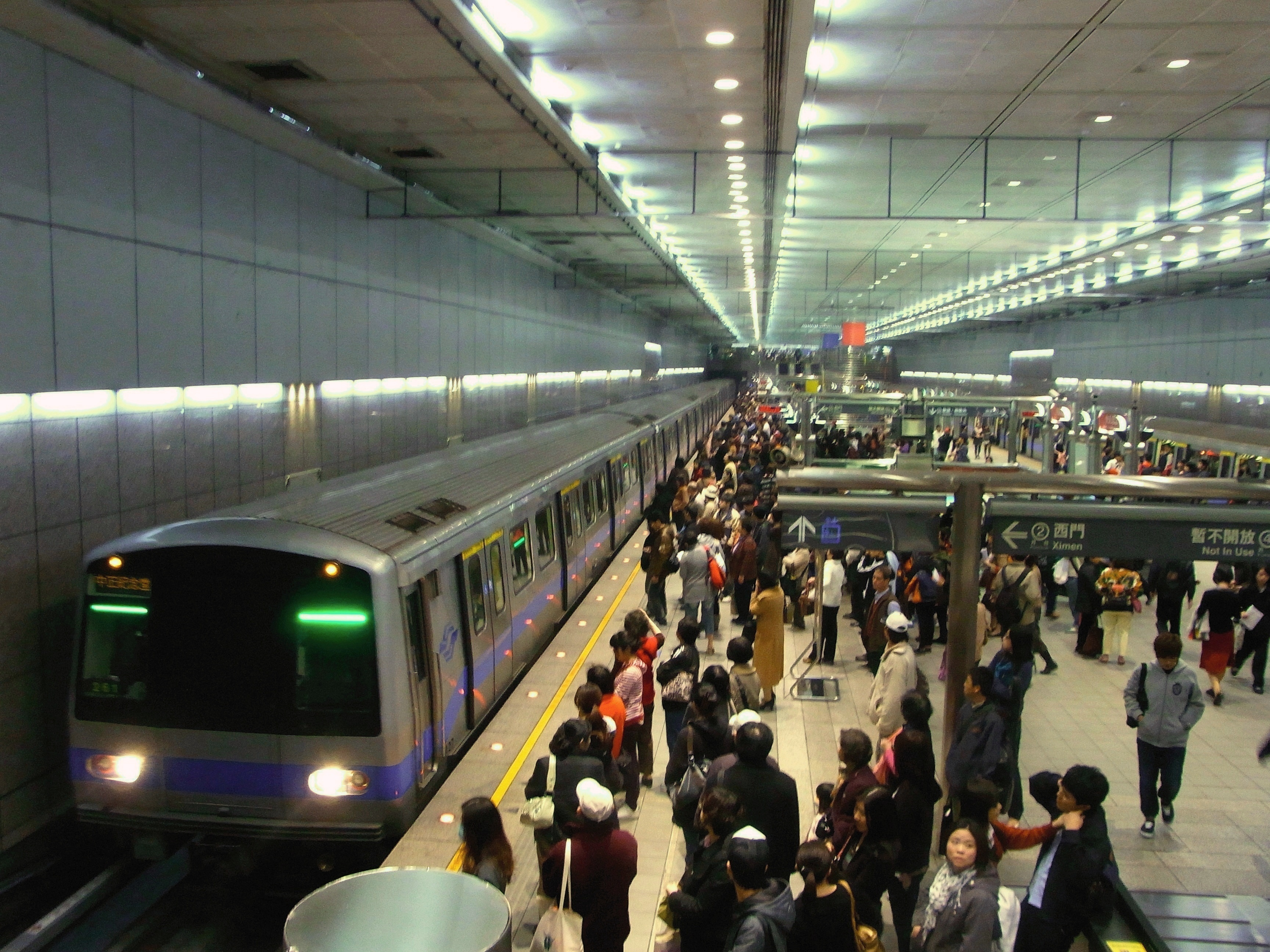
A C371 train on the Taipei Metro Songshan–Xindian line

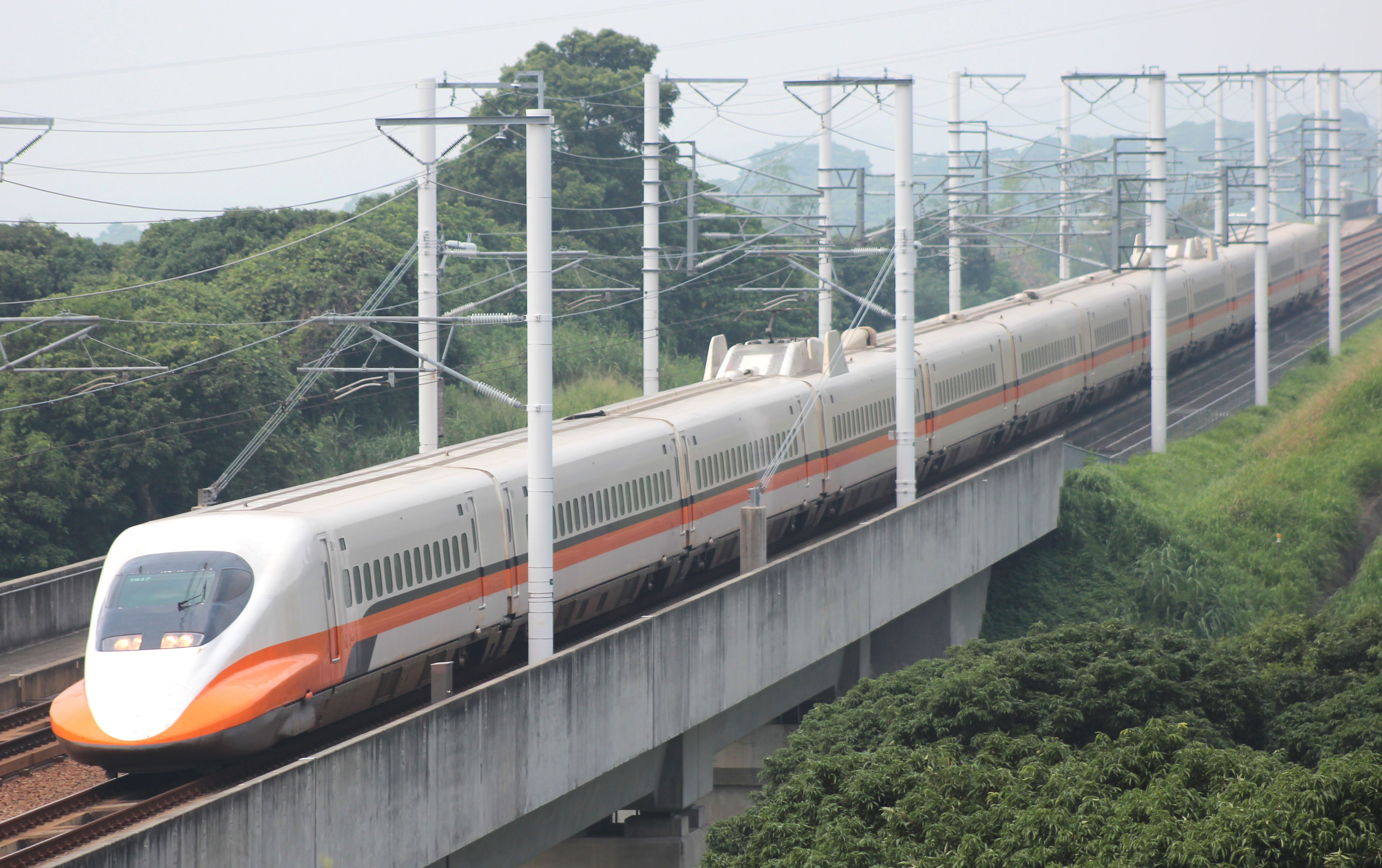
Taiwan Highspeed Rail 700T

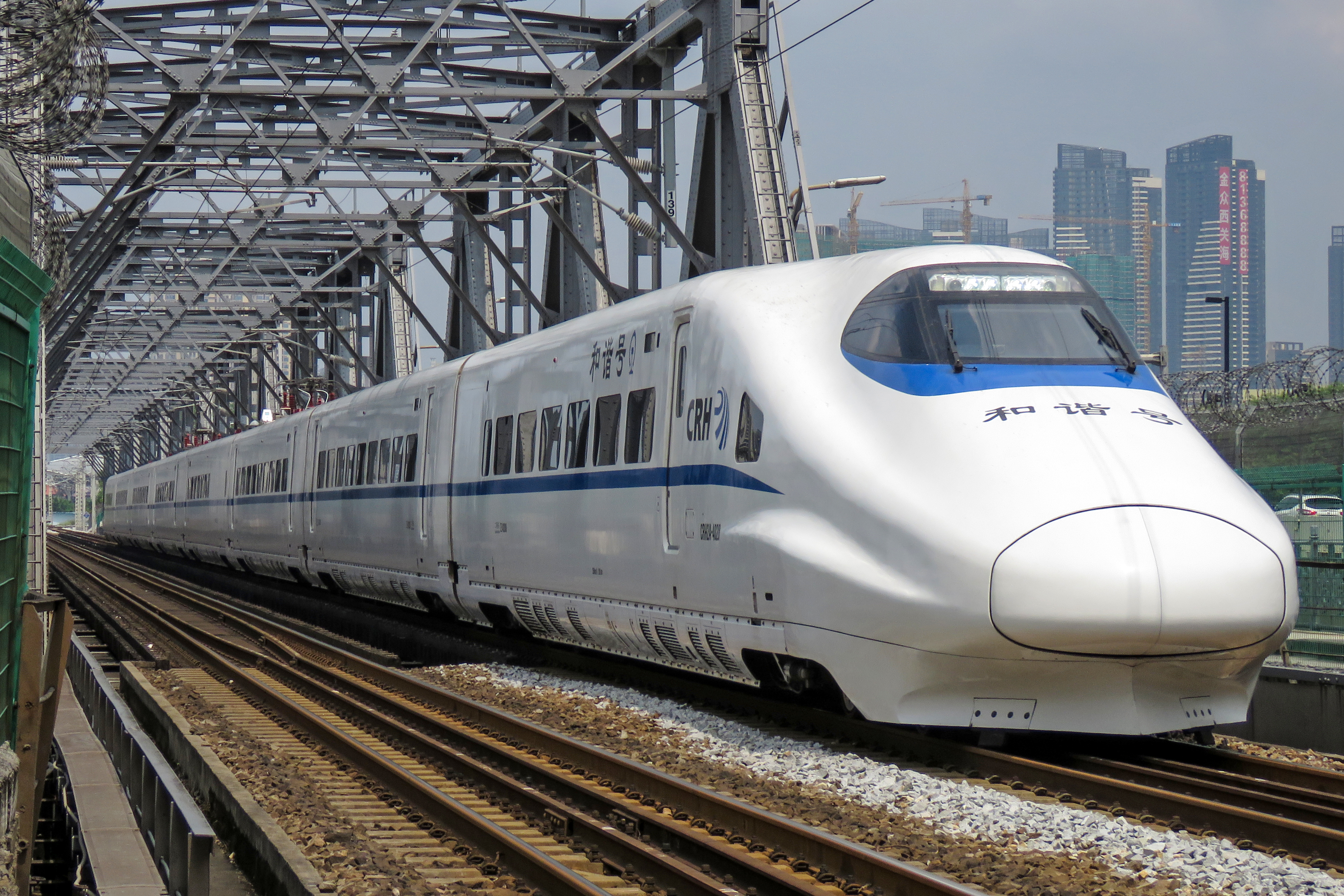
China CRH2

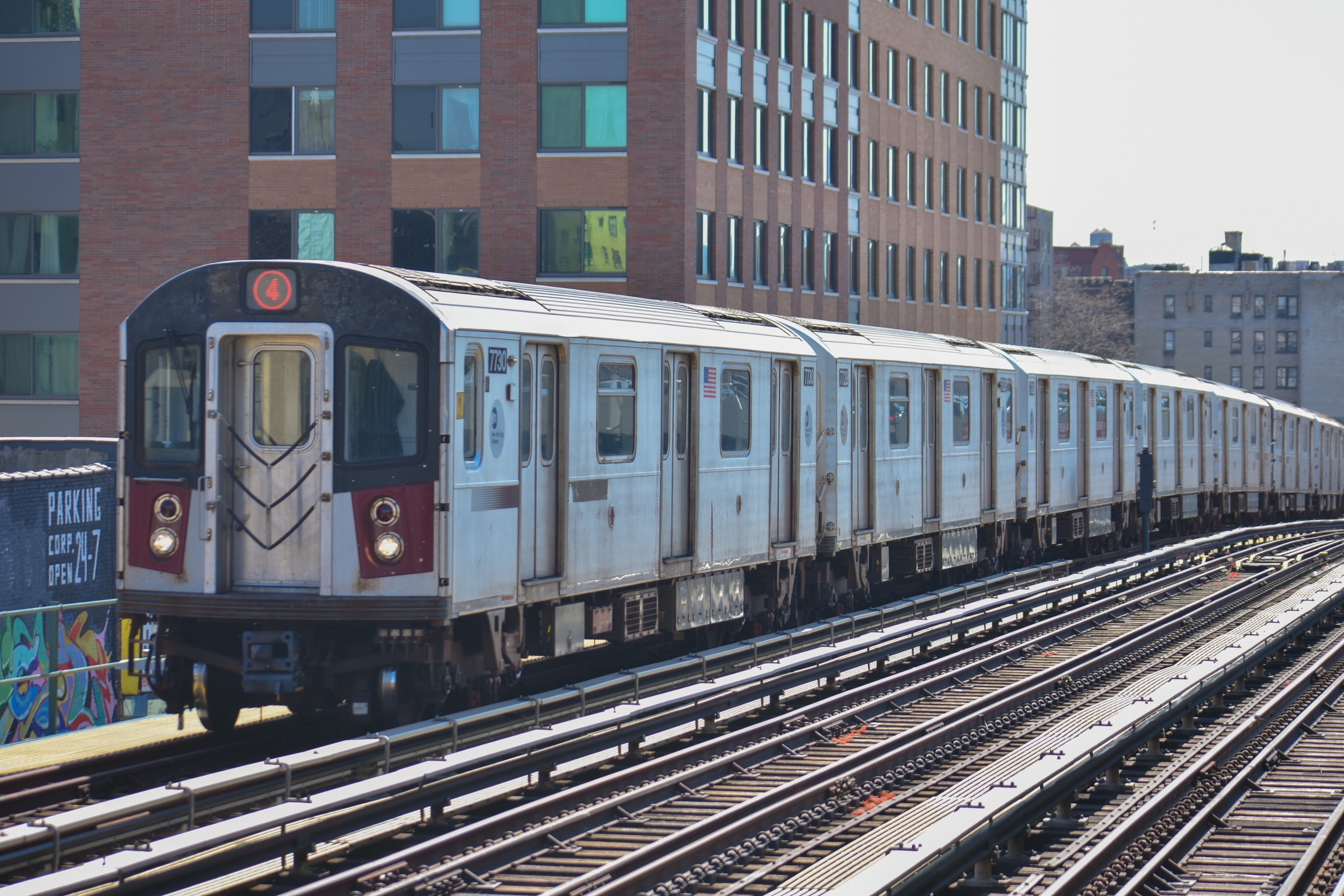
R142A subway cars on the 4 service of the New York City Subway

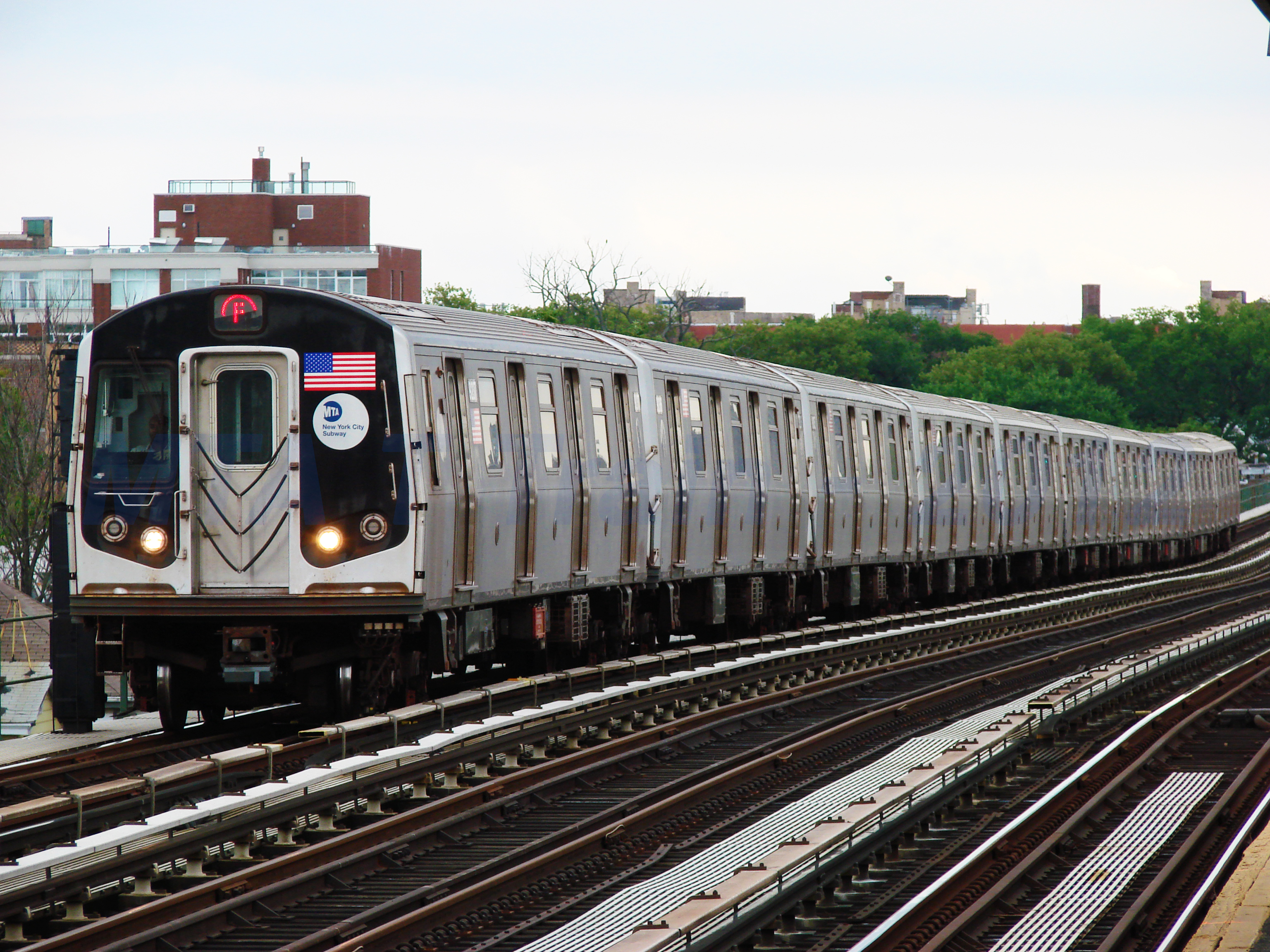
R160B subway cars on the F service of the New York City Subway

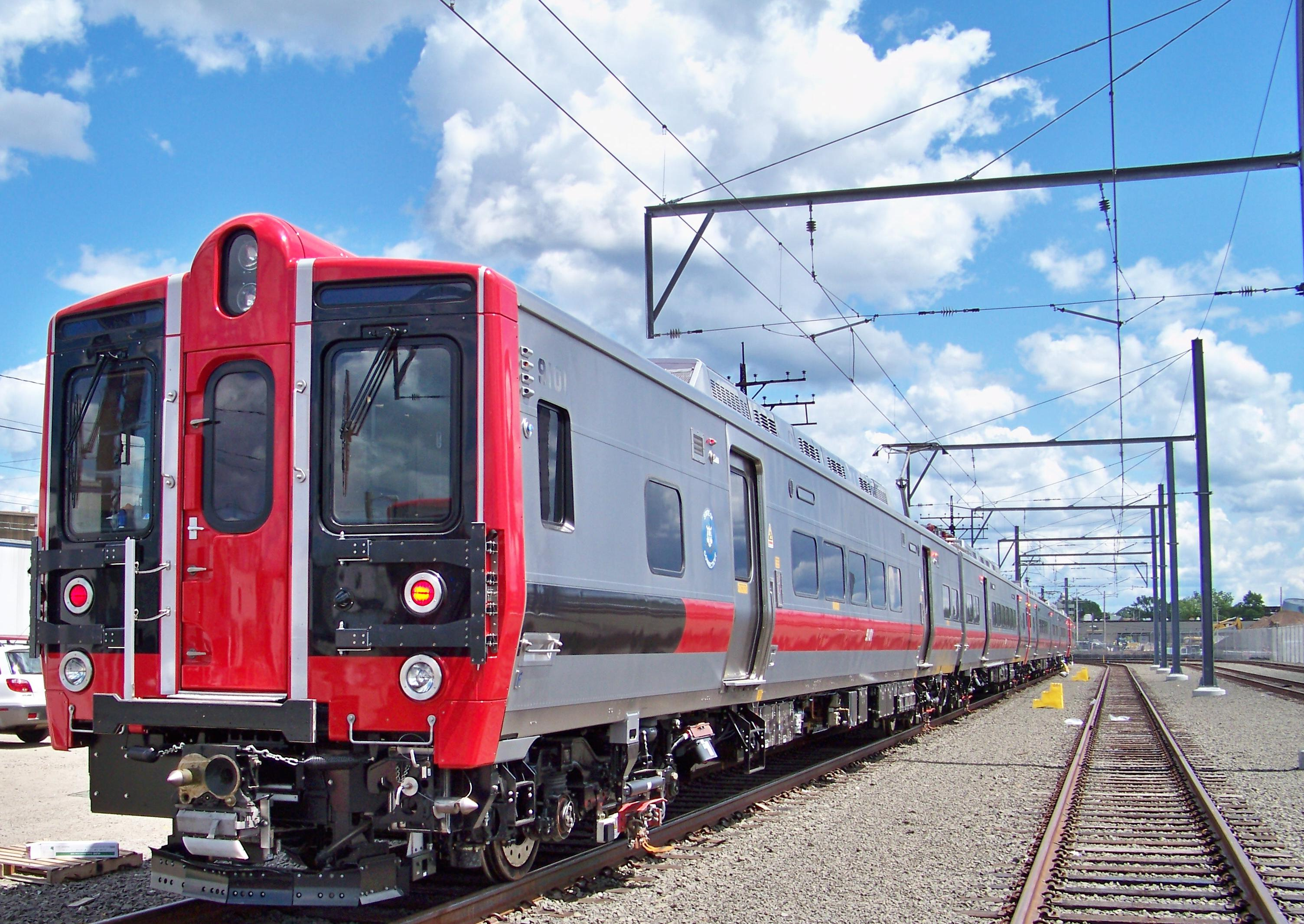
Metro North Railroad M8

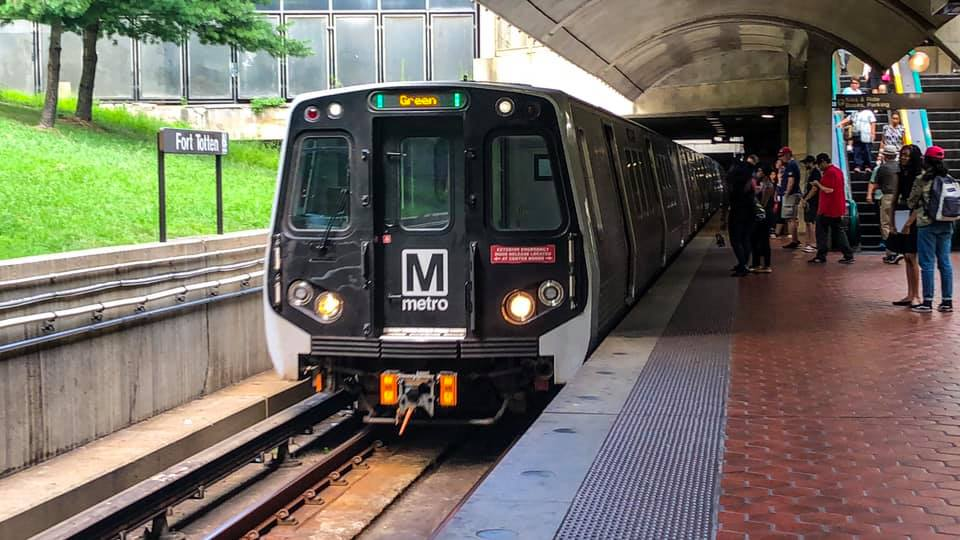
Washington Metro 7000 series

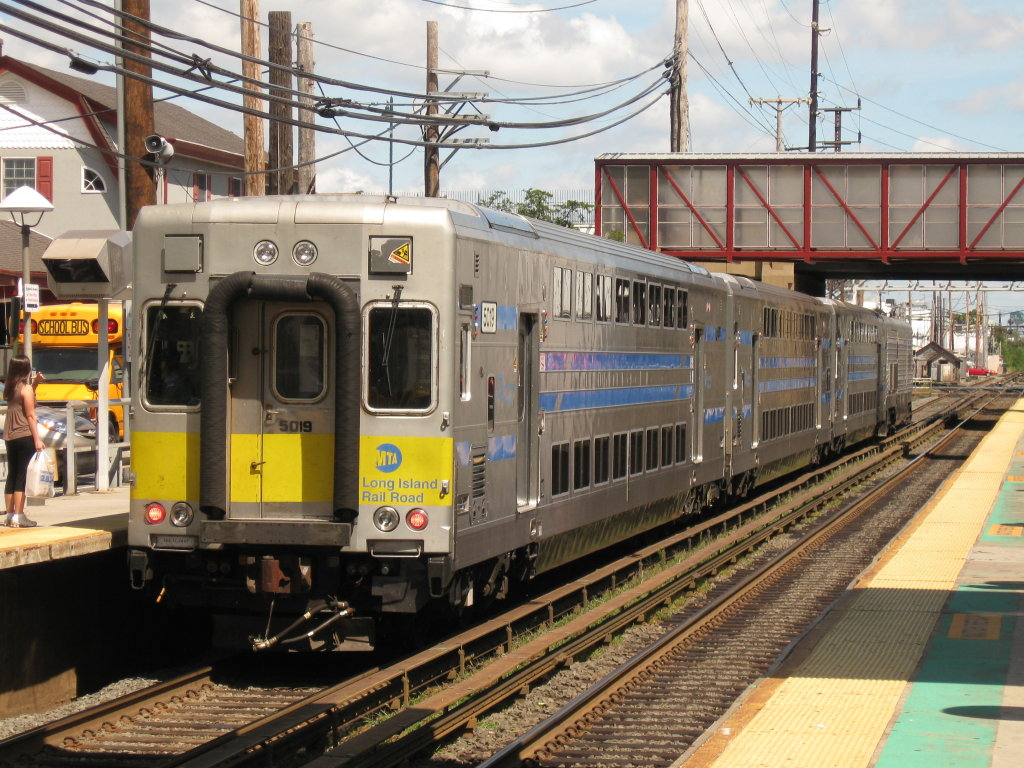
Long Island Rail Road C3 Bilevel

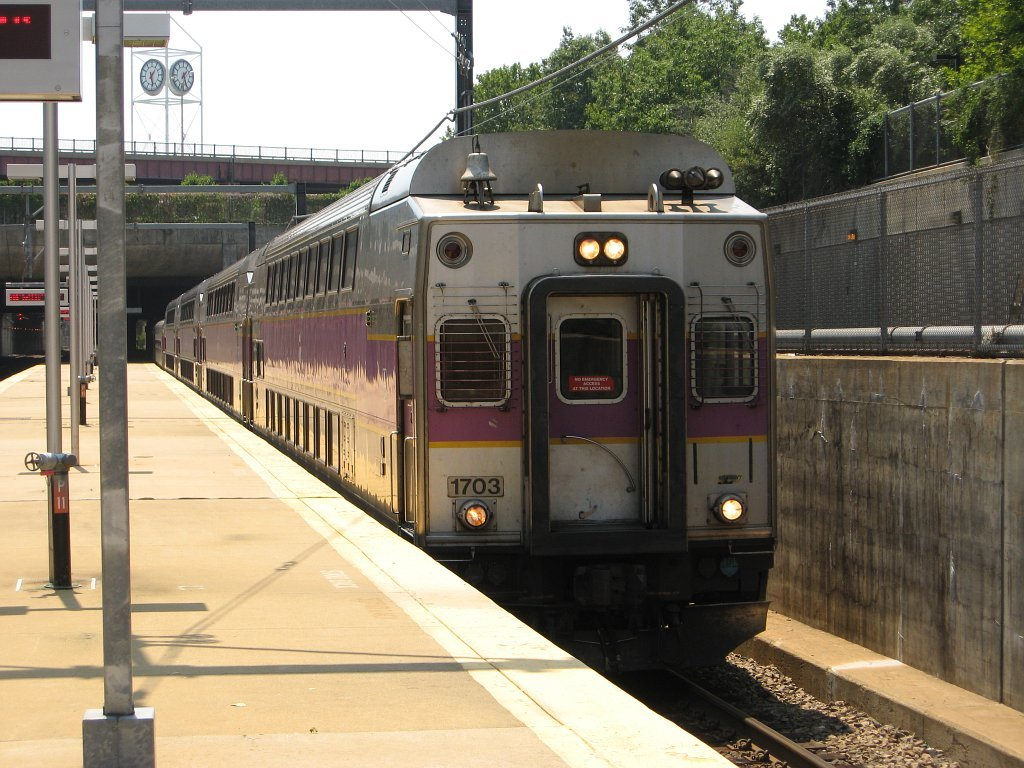
MBTA CTC-4 bilevel cab car
