= JR Freight Class DF200 =

Japanese diesel locomotive class

Class DF200
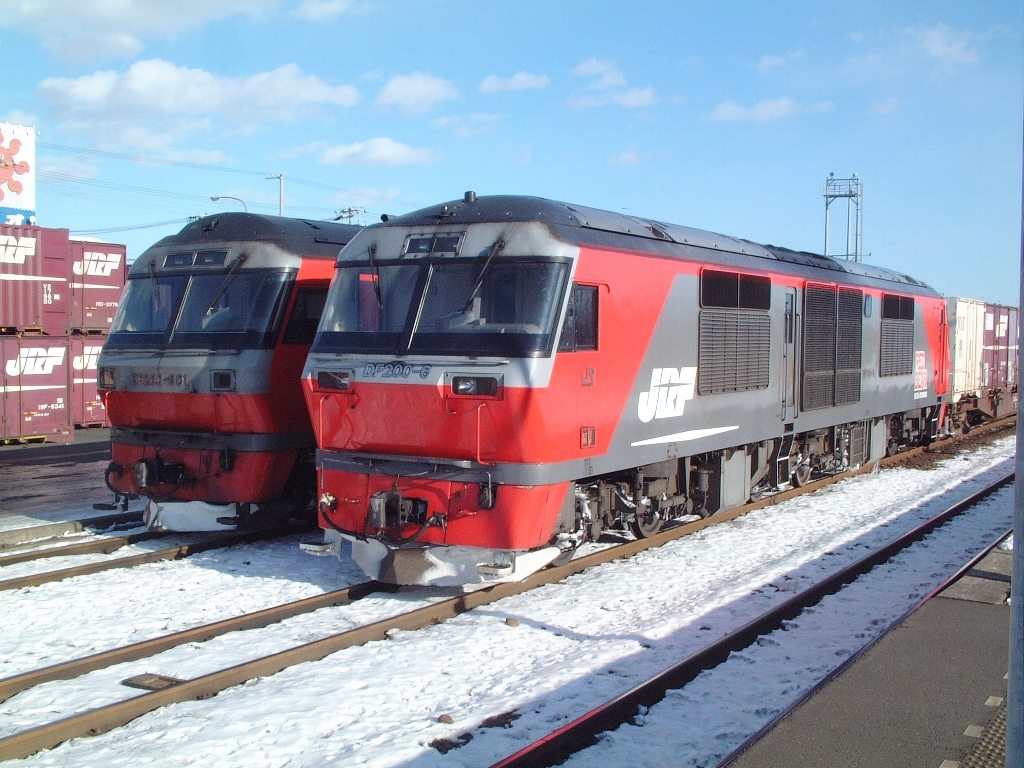
- DF200-901 and DF200-6 in January 2008
Type and origin
- Power type: Diesel–electric
- Builder: Kawasaki Heavy Industries
- Build date: 1992–2013
- Total produced: 50
- Rebuilder: Hitachi Rail
Specifications
- Configuration
  - UIC: Bo′Bo′Bo′
  - Commonwealth: Bo-Bo-Bo
- Gauge: 1,067 mm (3 ft 6 in)
- Bogies: 2-2-2
- Wheel diameter: 910 mm (35.83 in)
- Length: 19,600 mm (64 ft 3 5/8 in)
- Width: 2,944 mm (9 ft 7 7/8 in)
- Height: 4,078 mm (13 ft 4 1/2 in)
- Axle load: 16.0 t
- Loco weight: 96 t (94 long tons; 106 short tons)
- Traction motors: FMT100×6
Performance figures
- Maximum speed: 110 km/h (70 mph)
- Power output: 3,400 hp (2,500 kW) @ 1,800 rpm 3,600 hp (2,700 kW) @ 1,800 rpm (DF200-50/100)
- Tractive effort: 33,390 kgf (73,600 lbf)
Career
- Operators: JR Freight, JR Kyushu
- Number in class: 49 (as of 1 March 2017)
- First run: 1994
- Withdrawn: 1 unit withdrawn in 2012 following accident damage
- Disposition: In operation

The Class DF200 (DF200形) is a Bo-Bo-Bo wheel arrangement diesel–electric locomotive type operated by the Japan Freight Railway Company (JR Freight) and the Kyushu Railway Company.

As of 1 March 2017, JR Freight operates 48 Class DF200s, and JR Kyushu operates one (DF200-7000).

== Background ==
In Hokkaido, where the proportion of electrified sections on trunk lines is low, the Class DD51 had been the mainstay of freight transport since the introduction of "smokeless railways", regardless of whether they ran on electrified or non-electrified sections. After the creation of JR, the increase in freight transportation and the increasing speed of freight trains made the DD51's traction capacity insufficient, requiring trains to run with double heading. Due to the harsh climate in Hokkaido, the cars also became increasingly obsolete. To address these issues, the DF200 was developed.

It was rewarded with Laurel Prize in 1994.

== Variants ==
- DF200-900
- DF200-0
- DF200-50
- DF200-100
- DF200-200
- DF200-7000 (JR Kyushu)

== DF200-900 ==
The pre-production locomotive DF200-901 was delivered in March 1992 for testing. It has two MTU 12V396TE14 diesel engines. DF200-901 was withdrawn from regular service in fiscal 2023.

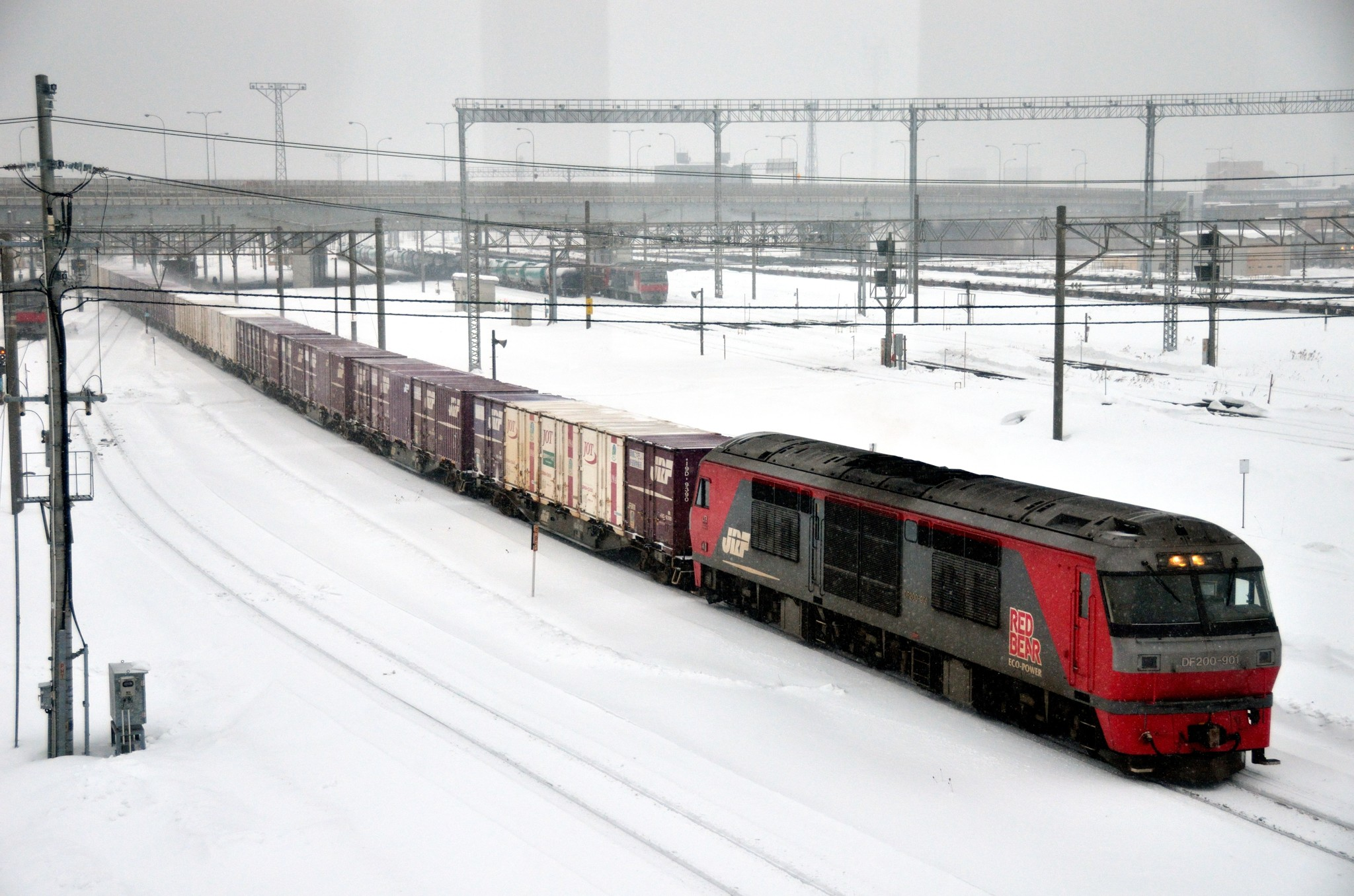
DF200-901 in December 2012

== DF200-0 ==
Full-production batch delivered from 1994. Red "JRF" logos were later replaced by white logos. 12 locomotives were built.

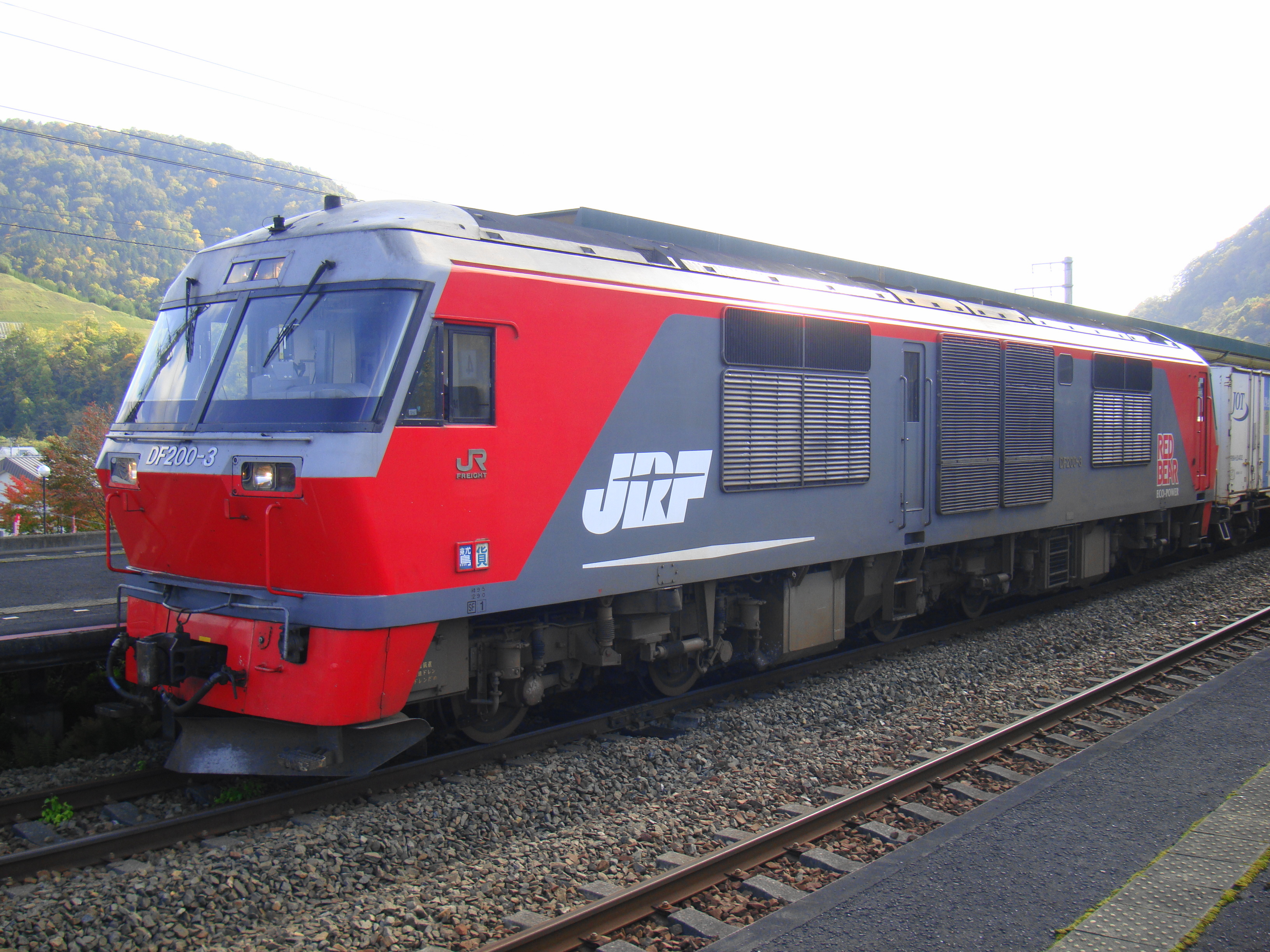
DF200-3 in October 2012

== DF200-50 ==
Batch built from March 2000 with Komatsu SDA12V170-1 diesel engines in place of the earlier MTU engines. External changes include grey front-end skirts, white "JRF" logos, and "Red Bear Eco Power" logos. 13 locomotives were built.

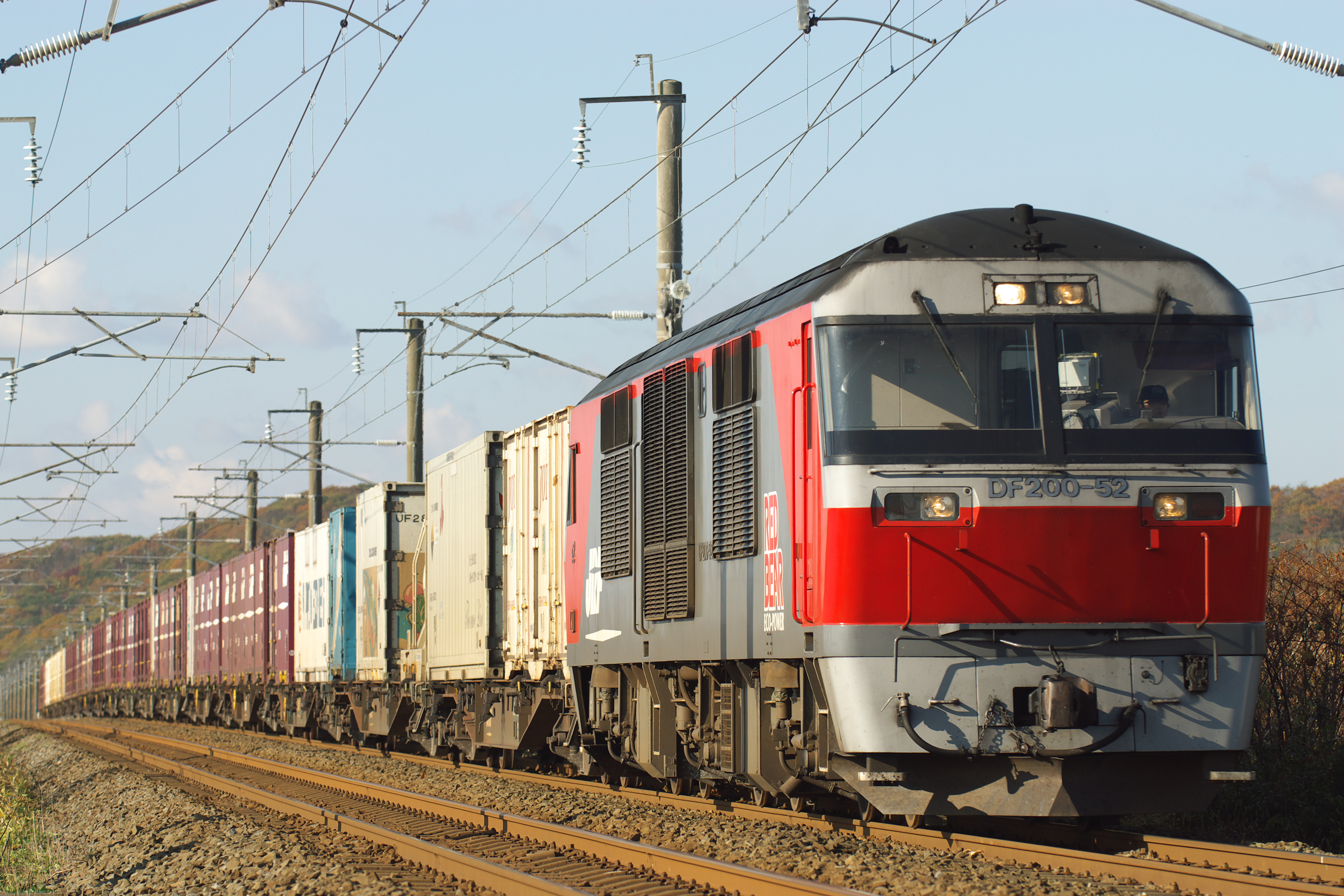
DF200-52 in October 2009

== DF200-100 ==
Batch built from August 2005 to December 2011 with IGBT VVVF inverters. 23 Class DF200-100 locomotives were built.

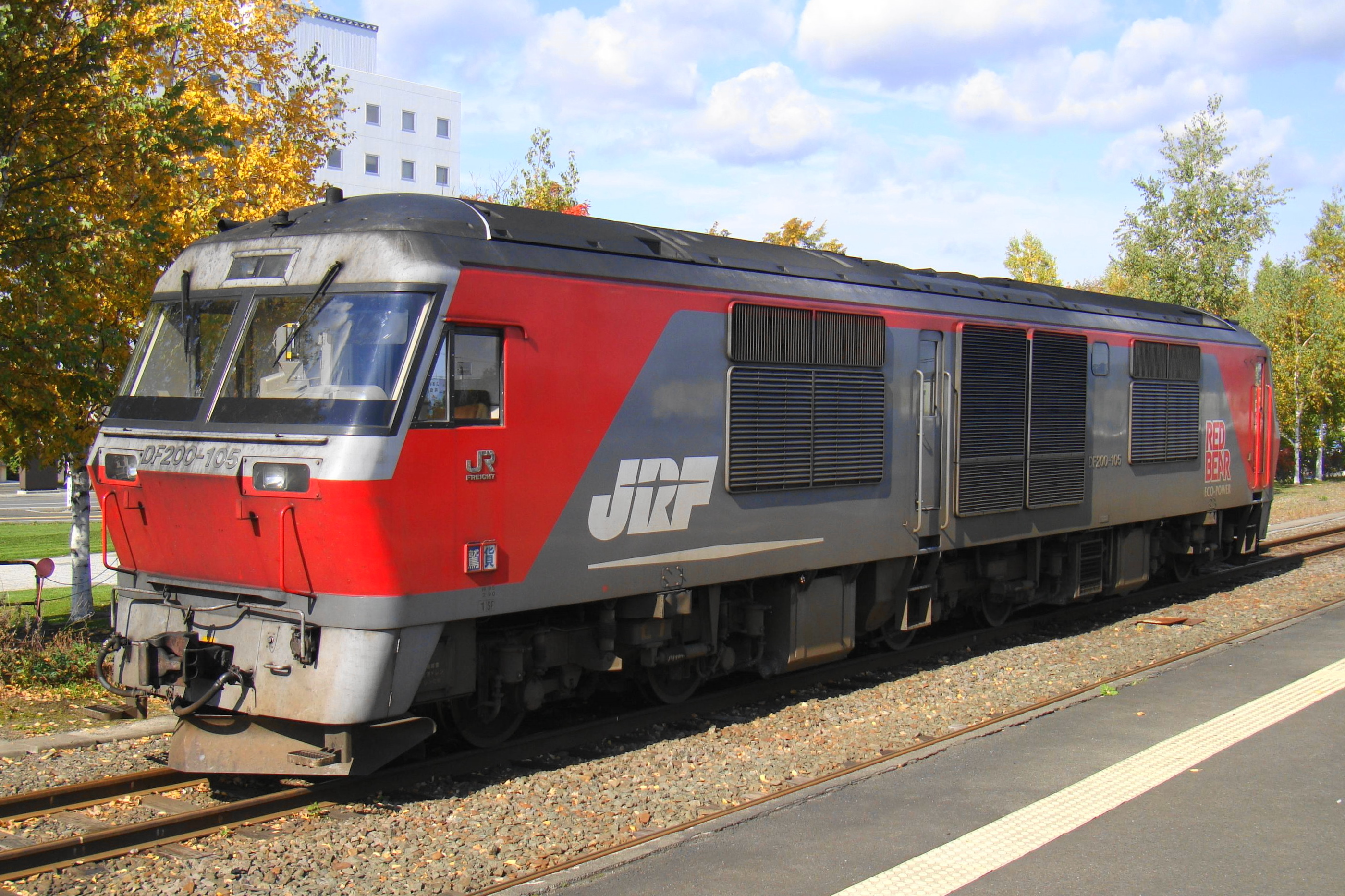
DF200-105 in October 2011

== DF200-200 ==
In 2016, DF200-123 was moved from Hokkaido to Suita Depot in Osaka, where it underwent modifications and renumbering to DF200-223 before being returned to service on the Kansai Main Line in the Nagoya area. This was followed by locomotives DF200-116 and DF200-120, which were similarly modified and renumbered DF200-216 and DF200-220 respectively in 2018.

== DF200-7000 ==
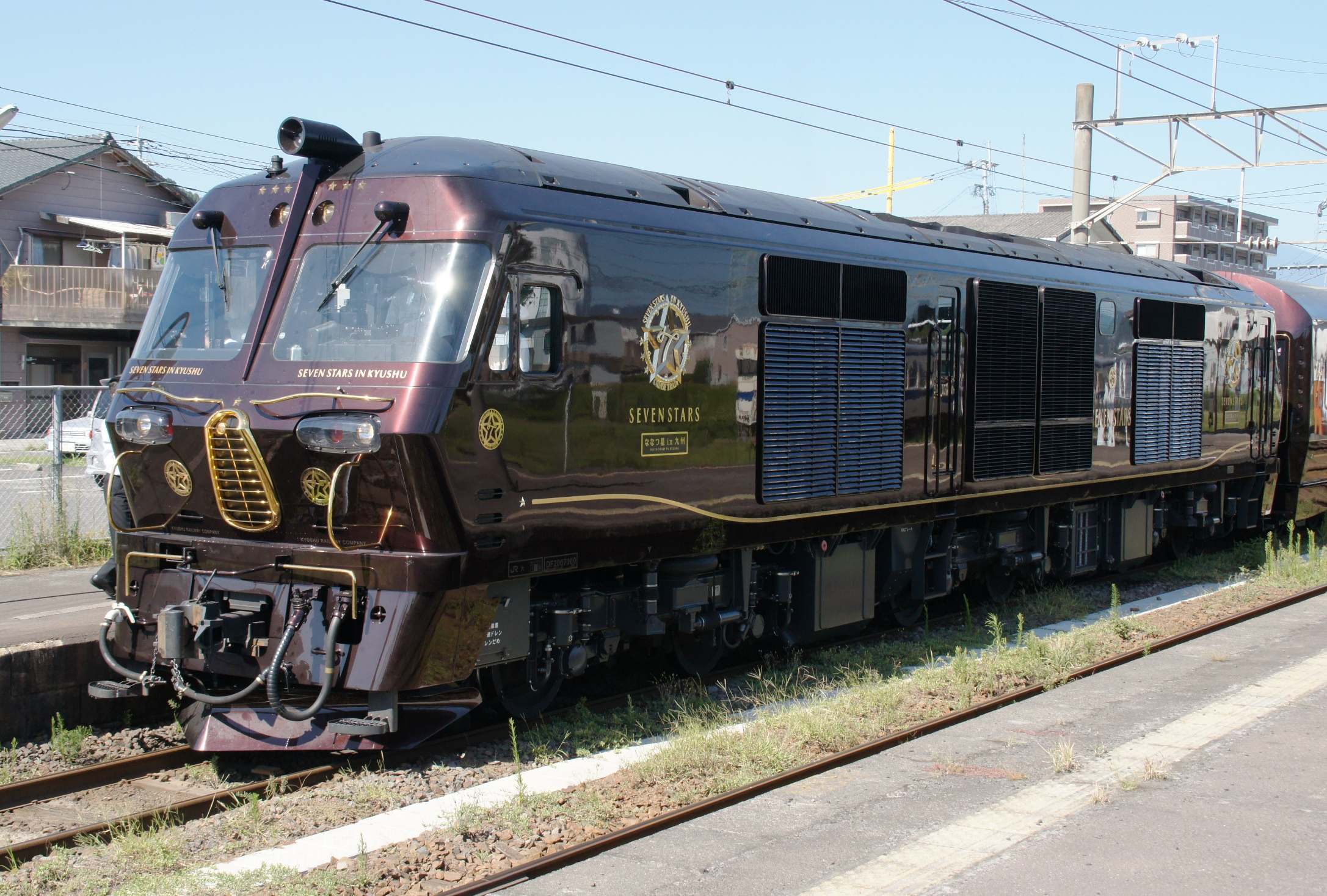
The dedicated Seven Stars in Kyushu locomotive, DF200-7000, in September 2013

A dedicated Class DF200-7000 diesel locomotive was built in 2013 for JR Kyushu's Seven Stars in Kyushu luxury excursion train. Built specially for use in Kyushu and finished in a deep maroon livery, the locomotive was built by Kawasaki Heavy Industries in Kobe, and delivered in July 2013.

== Classification ==
The DF200 classification for this locomotive type is explained below.

- D: Diesel locomotive
- F: Six driving axles
- 200: Diesel–electric locomotive with AC motors
