= ÖBB Class 4030 =

ÖBB 4030
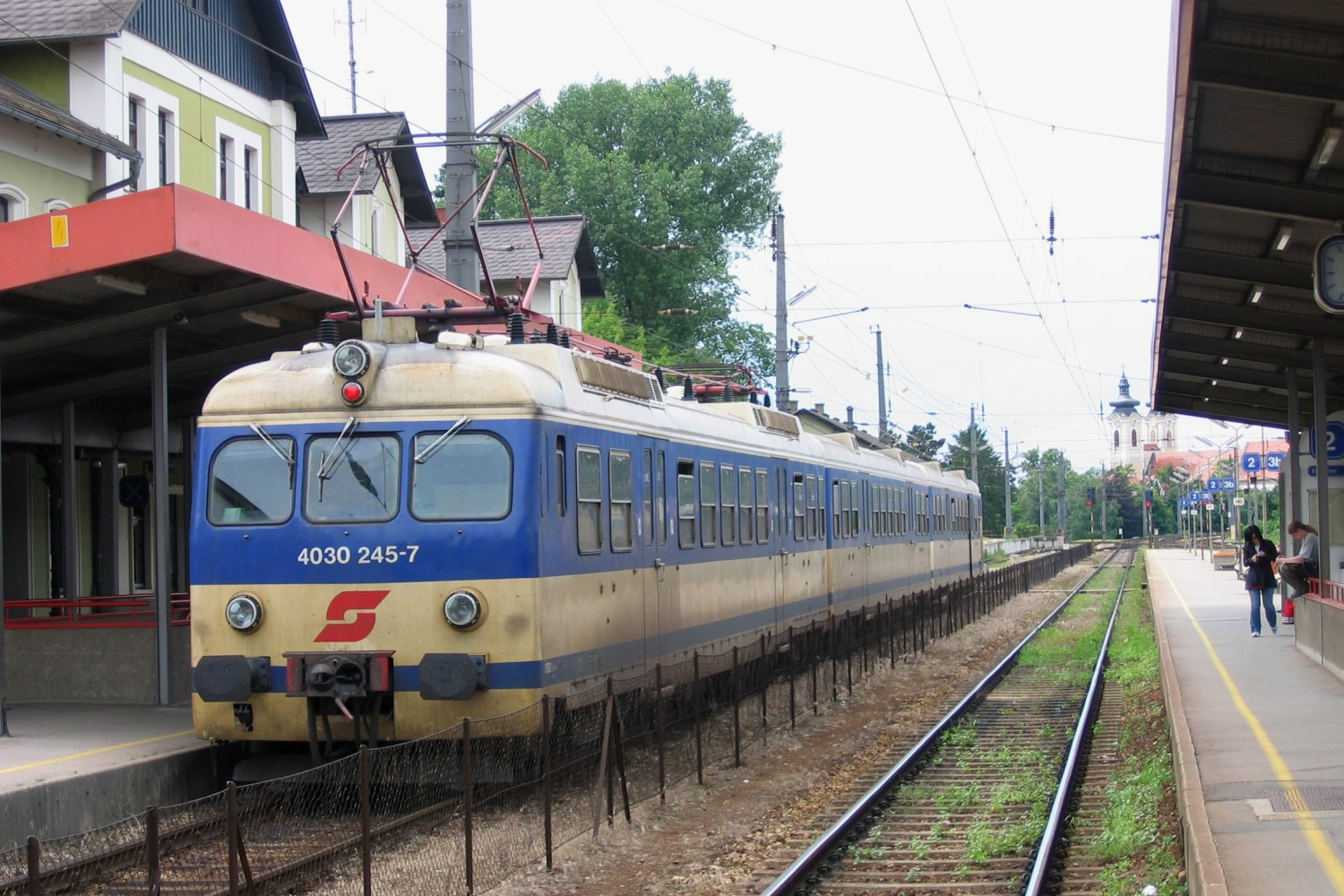
- 4030.2 in Tulln
- In service: 1956–2004
- Manufacturer: SGP, AEG, BBC
- Number built: 72 trainsets
- Operators: ÖBB

Specifications
- Maximum speed: Service: 100 km/h (62 mph)
- Power output: 1000 kW (continuous)
- Tractive effort: 99 kN (starting), 48kN (continuous)
- Electric system(s): 15 kV 16.7 Hz AC
- Current collector(s): Overhead lines
- Safety system(s): Sifa, PZB
- Track gauge: 1,435 mm (4 ft 8 1/2 in)

The Class 4030 of the Austrian Federal Railways (ÖBB) were electric multiple units. In the narrower sense, 4030 was the designation of the railcars, the control cars were designated as series 6030 and the intermediate cars as series 7030. They were used in regional train services from 1956 and, with some adaptations, were used as the first generation of trains for the Vienna Schnellbahn from 1962. Their use in scheduled services ended in 2004.

== History ==
The first series of the 4030 series was built between 1956 and 1960. These trains, designated 4030.0, were delivered as 4-car units. Intended for regional services, they were designed to operate in variable length from 2-car up to 5-car units. The 2nd series was intended for operation on the Vienna Schnellbahn line. When it became apparent that not enough 2nd series trains could be delivered before the opening in February 1962, the last four sets produced in the first series were adapted for operation on Vienna Schnellbahn at short notice by installing a multiple control system and pneumatic door closing device and designated as the 4030.1 series. The 4030.1 and the 4030.2 delivered from 1961 to 75 were 3-car units from the start. They were in operation as single (3-car) or double (6-car) trains. Later, the trains of the 1st series were also shortened to three cars. The designation was changed from 4030.0 to 4030.3 when they were retrofitted with a pneumatic door closing device and multiple control between 1969 and 1982. The surplus intermediate coaches were used as passenger coaches. This was possible without any problems as the couplings and transitions met the usual standards for passenger coaches.

From 1978, the ÖBB 4020 series multiple units were delivered as the 2nd generation of S-Bahn trains. At the beginning of 2000, all 72 class 4030 railcars were still in the ÖBB fleet, but the last sets were taken out of service at the end of 2004. They were taken out of service in connection with the delivery of the 4024 series commuter railcars.

== Preserved vehicles ==
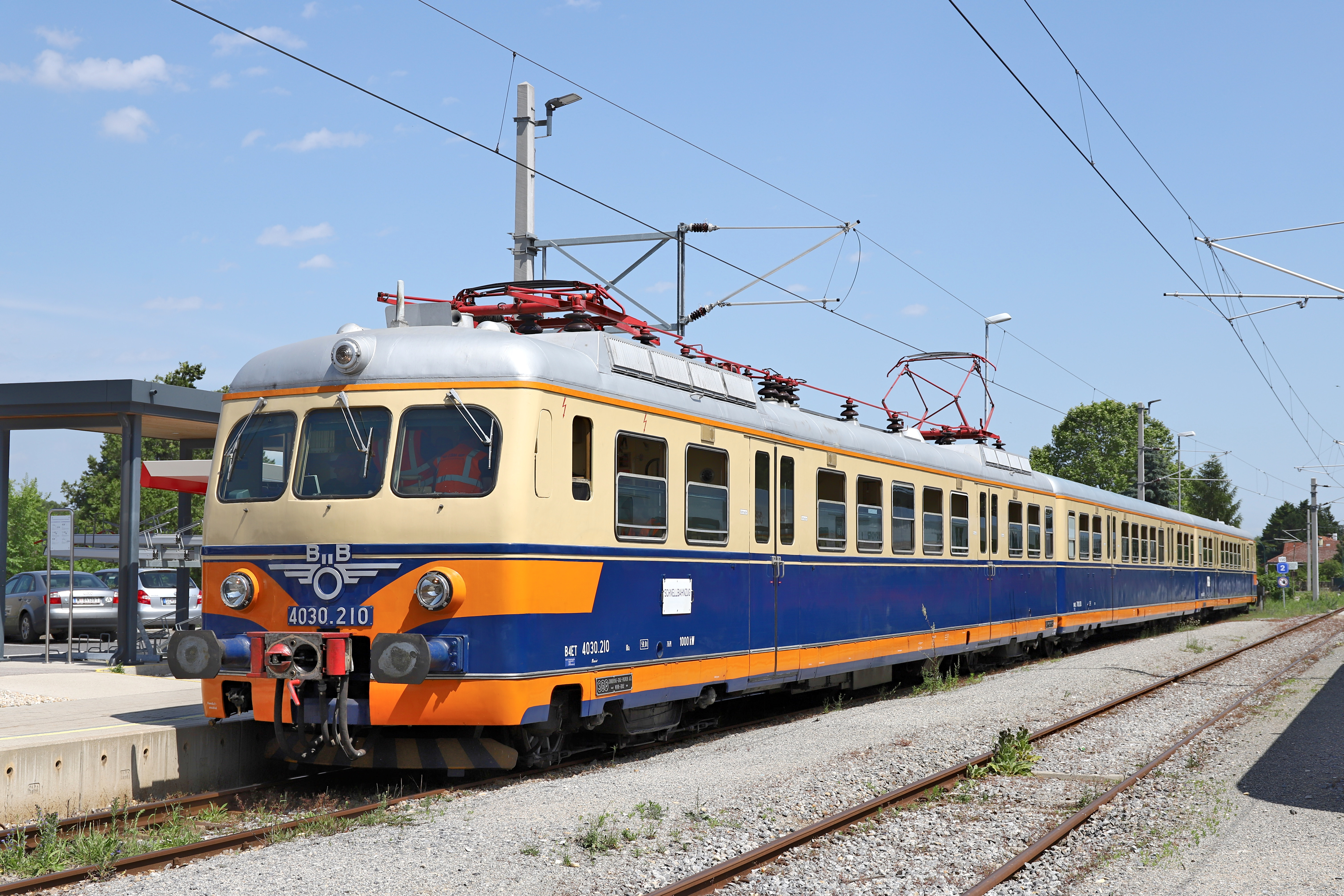
4030.210 in year 2024

4030.210 is the only remaining full trainset. It is legally protected as cultural property.
