= SGP M-222 Flamingo =

M-222 Flamingo
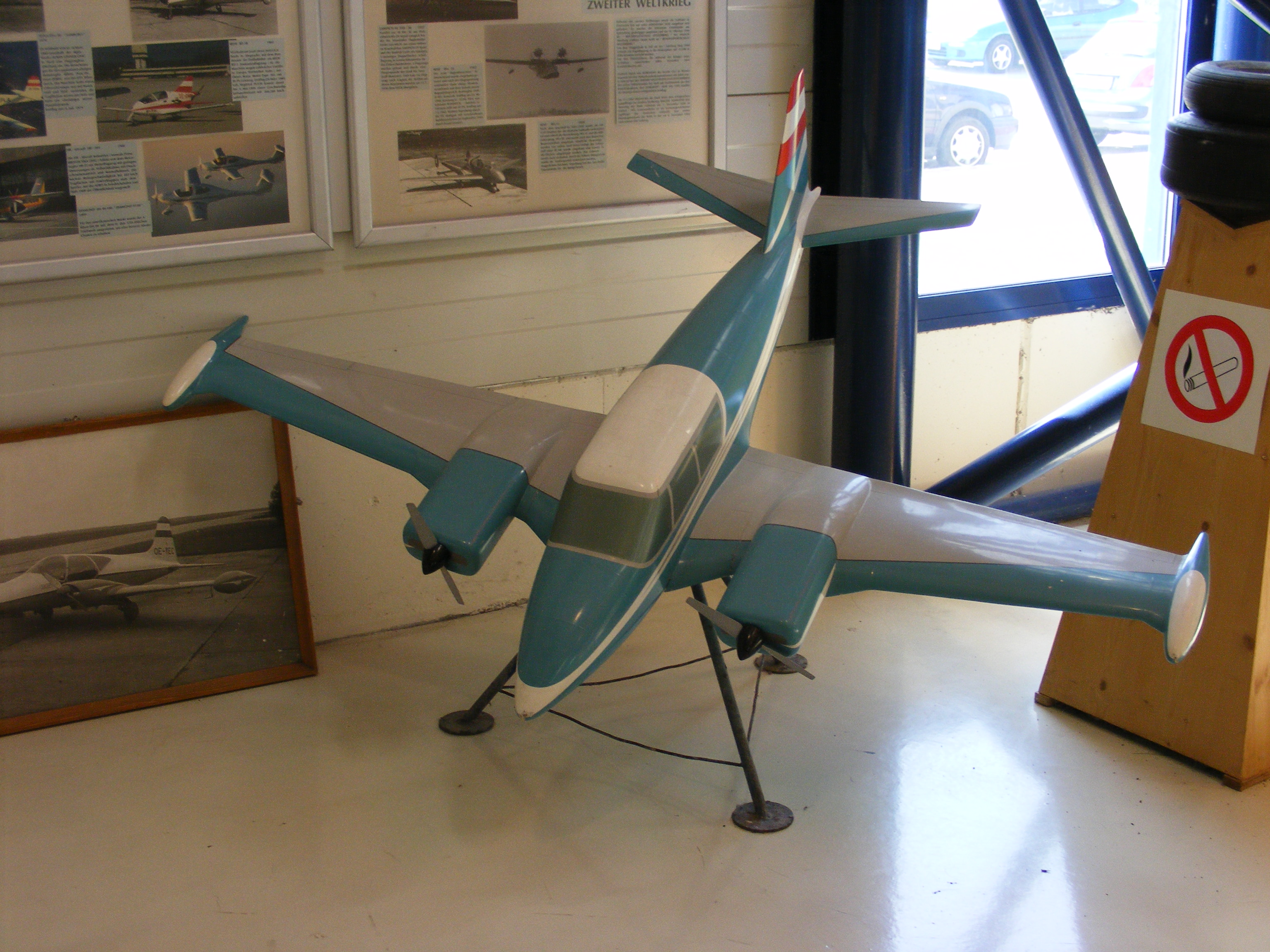
- A model of an SGP M-222 Flamingo

General information
- Type: 4-seat twin engine light aircraft
- National origin: Austria
- Manufacturer: Simmering-Graz-Pauker A.G.
- Designer: Erich Meindl
- Number built: 4

History
- First flight: 15 May 1959

The SGP M-222 Flamingo was an Austrian twin engine, four seat light aircraft, developed with a series of prototypes into the early 1960s. There was no series production.

== Design and development ==
In the 1950s Simmering-Graz-Pauker A.G. (SGP) was a large manufacturing concern but the M-222 Flamingo was their first aircraft. It was a conventional twin engine monoplane, smaller than many but seating four in two rows.

The wings of the Flamingo had a laminar flow airfoil and were made entirely of wood. The first prototype was powered by 150 hp (112 kW) Lycoming O-320 flat-four engines but later aircraft had 200 hp (150 kW) Lycoming IO-360 flat-fours. These were conventionally mounted ahead of the leading edge in long cowlings with their propeller shafts, driving two-blade airscrews, centred above the wing upper surface. There were fuel tanks in the thin wings, with more fuel in wing tip tanks. Unusually, the Flamingo was fitted with both flaps and airbrakes. The flaps were of the camber changing type, to increase lift at low speed; they were split into three sections on each wing and slid rearwards and downwards on concealed rails. The airbrakes were wing mounted spoilers for losing speed. Like the wings the empennage was all-wood; the cantilever tailplane was set low on the fuselage.

The Flamingo's fuselage had a welded steel tube structure, skinned forward with light alloy and aft with laminated plastic. Its two rows of seats were enclosed under a three part canopy which merged at the rear into the raised fuselage. There was a wide door on either side for cabin access and a separate baggage space behind the seats. It had a retractable tricycle undercarriage with the mainwheels, fitted with brakes, behind the engines. The nosewheel was steerable. The undercarriage, like the flaps and airbrakes, were hydraulically powered.

The first prototype flew for the first time on 15 May 1959 but was lost in a fatal crash during single engine tests on 2 August 1959. Development work continued on a second aircraft which first flew in 1960 and a third followed in 1962. The fourth aircraft, now renamed the Simmering-Graz-Pauker SGP.222 was intended as a production prototype and demonstrator and appeared at the 1964 Hamburg show, though it turned out to be the last of the line. It incorporated several changes in response to the lengthy development trials. The wing leading edges had breaker strips added and there were new fillets in this edge at the root and on the outboard side of the engine cowlings. The ailerons were mass balanced and fitted with ground adjustable trim tabs, and the upper hinge gaps sealed with fabric. The most obvious external changes were to the empennage where the horizontal tail now had positive dihedral and the previously rounded vertical tail had been enlarged and given severe straight taper, assisted by a ventral fin to improve low speed handling. Both elevators and the rudder had trim tabs.

One independent report of this fourth aircraft's handling found it well behaved, stable but responsive with a docile stall and brisk climb. It received its Austrian and FAA Type Certificates early in 1964. After US certification the designation SGP.222VS (VS being German for US) was briefly used but this was later changed to SGP.222A. At the end of 1964 the programme was terminated and the three surviving examples scrapped.

== Specifications (second prototype) ==
Data from Jane's All the World's Aircraft 1962–63

General characteristics

- Crew: One
- Capacity: Three passengers
- Length: 8.80 m (28 ft 10 in)
- Wingspan: 11.90 m (39 ft 1 in)
- Height: 3.05 m (10 ft 0 in)
- Wing area: 18.38 m^{2} (197.8 sq ft)
- Aspect ratio: 7.68
- Empty weight: 1,250 kg (2,756 lb) equipped
- Max takeoff weight: 1,900 kg (4,189 lb)
- Fuel capacity: 380 L (100.4 US gal, 83.6 Imp gal)
- Powerplant: 2 × Lycoming IO-360 4-cylinder, air-cooled horizontally opposed, 150 kW (200 hp) each
- Propellers: 2-bladed

Performance

- Maximum speed: 330 km/h (210 mph, 180 kn) at sea level
- Cruise speed: 280 km/h (170 mph, 150 kn) economical, 65% power
- Range: 1,650 km (1,030 mi, 890 nmi)
- Service ceiling: 6,100 m (20,000 ft) service
- Rate of climb: 7.5 m/s (1,480 ft/min) at sea level
- Wing loading: 103 kg/m^{2} (21 lb/sq ft)
- Power/mass: 160 W/kg (0.096 hp/lb)
- Landing speed: 105 km/h (65 mph; 57 kn)
- Landing run: 135 m (443 ft) using brakes
- Take-off run: 300 m (985 ft) to 15 m (50 ft)

== See also ==
Aircraft of comparable role, configuration, and era

- Aero Ae 45
- Beagle B.206
- Beechcraft Baron
- Britten Sheriff
- Cessna 310
- Let L-200 Morava
- Piper Aztec
