= ÖBB Class 4020 =

Train of the Austrian Federal Railways

ÖBB 4020
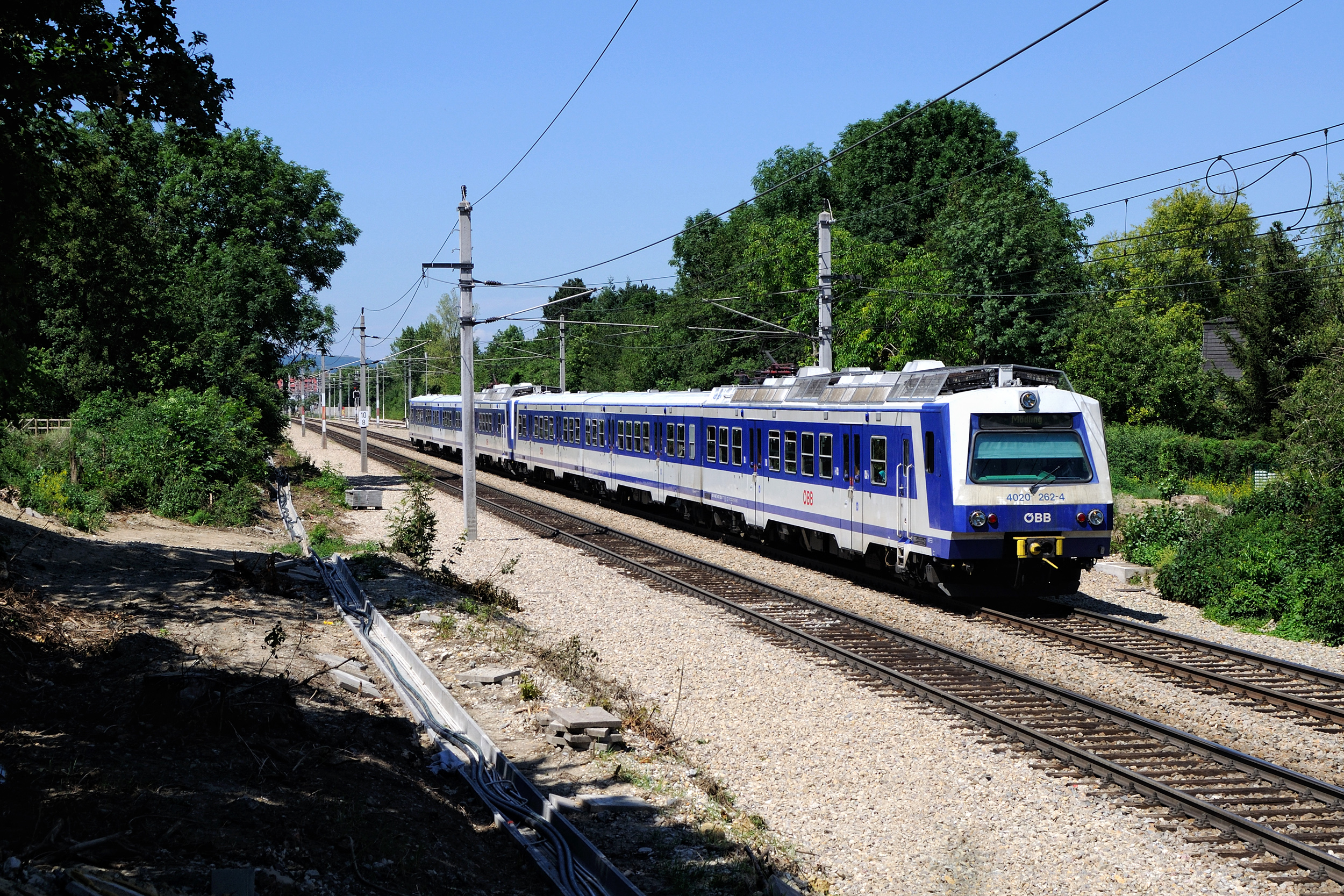
- 4020 262 in Perchtoldsdorf
- Stock type: Electric multiple unit
- In service: 1978 – 2026
- Manufacturers: Mechanical part: SGP, Electrical equipment: BBC, Siemens ELIN
- Constructed: 1978–1987
- Number built: 120 trainsets, 07/2024 still 29 in passenger service
- Capacity: 184 (56+64+64)
- Operator: ÖBB

Specifications
- Train length: 69,400 millimetres (2,730 in)
- Car length: 23.3 m (76 ft 5 5/16 in) (rail-/control carriage); 22.8 m (74 ft 9 5/8 in) (intermediate carriage)
- Width: 2,872 mm (9 ft 5 1/16 in)
- Height: 3,750 mm (12 ft 3 5/8 in)
- Floor height: 1150 mm
- Maximum speed: 120 km/h (75 mph)
- Acceleration: 0.7 m/s/s (1.6 mph/s)
- Electric system: 15 kV 16.7 Hz AC
- Current collection: Pantograph
- Braking systems: Wave disk brakes Resistance brake, wheel disk brakes, additional block brake
- Safety systems: Sifa, PZB90
- Coupling system: Automatic center buffer coupling type Scharfenberg (at Cab ends) Mechanical close coupling via coupling rods
- Track gauge: 1,435 mm (4 ft 8 1/2 in)

The ÖBB class 4020 of ÖBB are electric multiple units (EMU) developed by Simmering-Graz-Pauker. In the narrower sense, 4020 is the designation of the railcars, the control cars are referred to as series 6020 and the intermediate cars as series 7020. They are the second generation of Vienna S-Bahn trains and were also used throughout Austria in regional transport. Operation in scheduled services began in October 1978, the sets were manufactured by Simmering-Graz-Pauker in Graz.

== History ==
=== Background ===
In the mid-1970s, ÖBB decided to procure new vehicles for local transport in metropolitan areas, in particular for the Vienna rapid transport system. After several test runs with EMUs from other railways (including the DB 420 series), ÖBB ordered a total of 120 three-car sets of the 4020 series from SGP in several series for use on the Vienna express line and for regional transport in conurbations such as the Tyrol-Inn Valley and the greater Linz area. The design of the 4020 series was based on the concept of the older 4030 series, but otherwise broke completely new ground: the 4020 series railcars were equipped with thyristor control and mixed-current motors, powerful electric resistance brakes and cradle less bogies with air suspension. As was customary at the time, the electrical equipment was supplied by the BES consortium, consisting of the companies Brown-Boveri, ELIN, and Siemens under the leadership of Siemens. The electrical company responsible for the electrical commissioning was indicated on the factory plate of each vehicle. Johann Benda, who had previously designed the 4010 series railcar trains, was also responsible for the design of these vehicles.

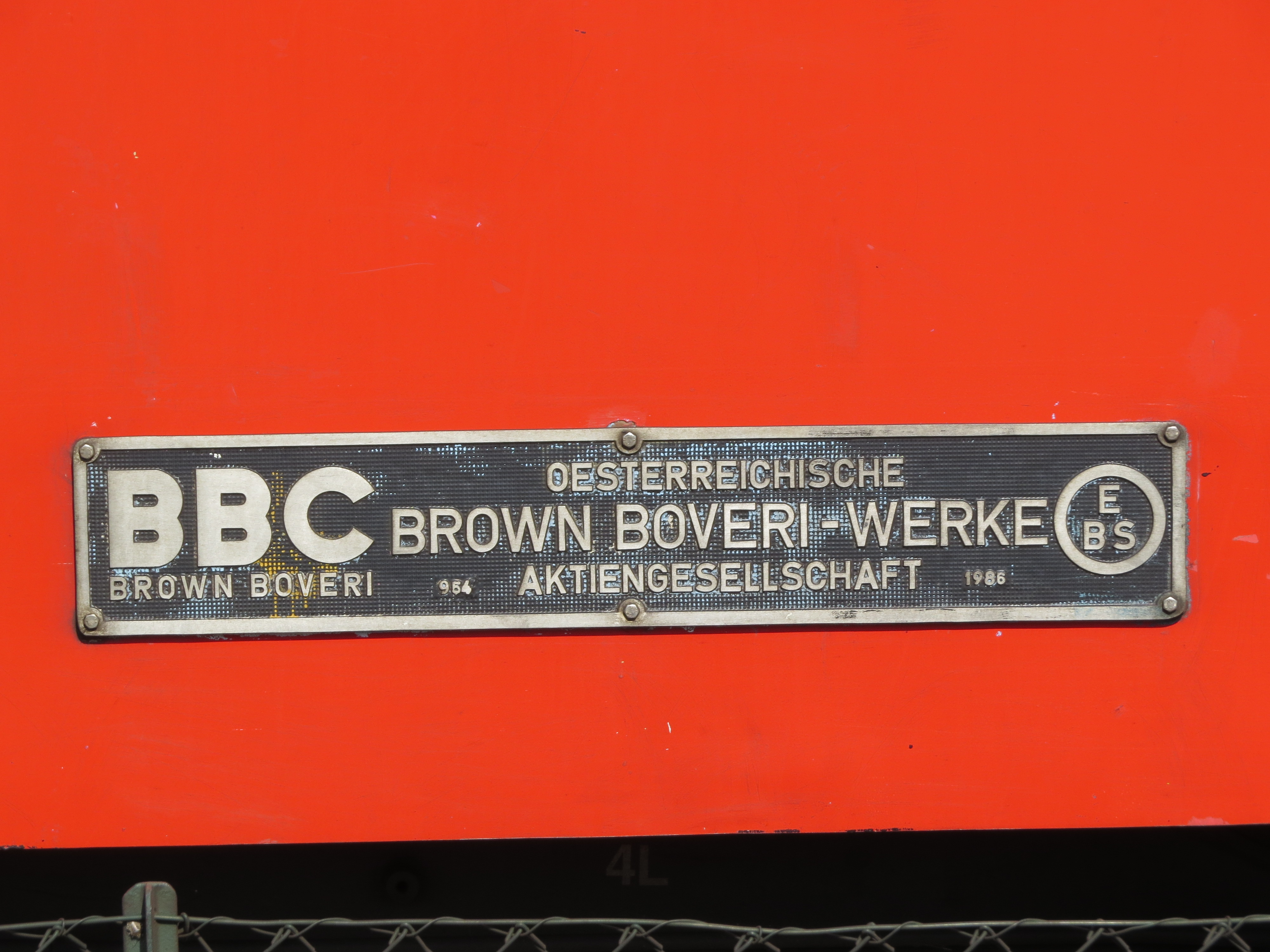
Brown, Boveri & Cie builder's plate

==== Service entry ====
After the first test runs in October 1978, the railcars were used for the first time in scheduled service on the later S80 line from December 1978. After test runs in Tyrol, they were used for the first time on the main line from spring 1979, primarily in the direction of Stockerau.

After commissioning the first series (4020.01-40), it became apparent that the rotary compressors adopted from the 4030 series were not sufficient to supply compressed air to the very high-consumption air suspension, which is why screw compressors were used from unit 4020.41 onwards. However, the problems with the compressed air supply could only be permanently eliminated with the use of heavy piston compressors from unit 4020.81 onwards. Later, all rotary compressors were replaced by piston compressors.

==== Conversions ====
With the reopening of the Suburban line in 1987, railcars 4020 095 to 100 were equipped with a door area monitoring system with light barriers for unaccompanied operation.

Railcar 4020 006, which was involved in an accident in Süßenbrunn in 1991, was the first railcar to undergo a main overhaul, during which some of the modifications from the main overhaul carried out from 1993 onwards were tested. Due to the absence of the other two 4020 series vehicles involved in the accident during the long overhaul, one of the two accident sets, 4020 056, was also used as a two-car set in the following months. This ran on the S80 line or as a regional train between Gramatneusiedl and Wampersdorf.

In the years from 1993, all railcars underwent a major overhaul, which was recognisable both technically and externally by the change of paintwork. However, some of the work had already been carried out on all railcars without the main refurbishment.

From 2002, the railcars that had already been rebuilt at this time were fitted with an emergency brake override (EBO), while the others received them during the subsequent main upgrade.

From 2011, a train formation monitoring system had to be installed for a trial operation without train attendants in double traction, as train separations had occurred that were not indicated to the train driver due to rail misconduct.

For permanent one-man operation, the door handles and door control system were modified again from 2016, and TSI-compliant warning systems were also installed.

== Details ==
=== Differentiating between the individual vehicles ===
The 4020 series are three-part units, each consisting of a motor car (4020), intermediate car (7020) and control car (6020). The vehicles also bear the class designations B4hET (4020), B4hTl (7020) and B4hES (6020). Each of these carriages is equipped with two wide entrances with centrally closing swing-sliding doors with pneumatic opening aid on each side of the carriage.

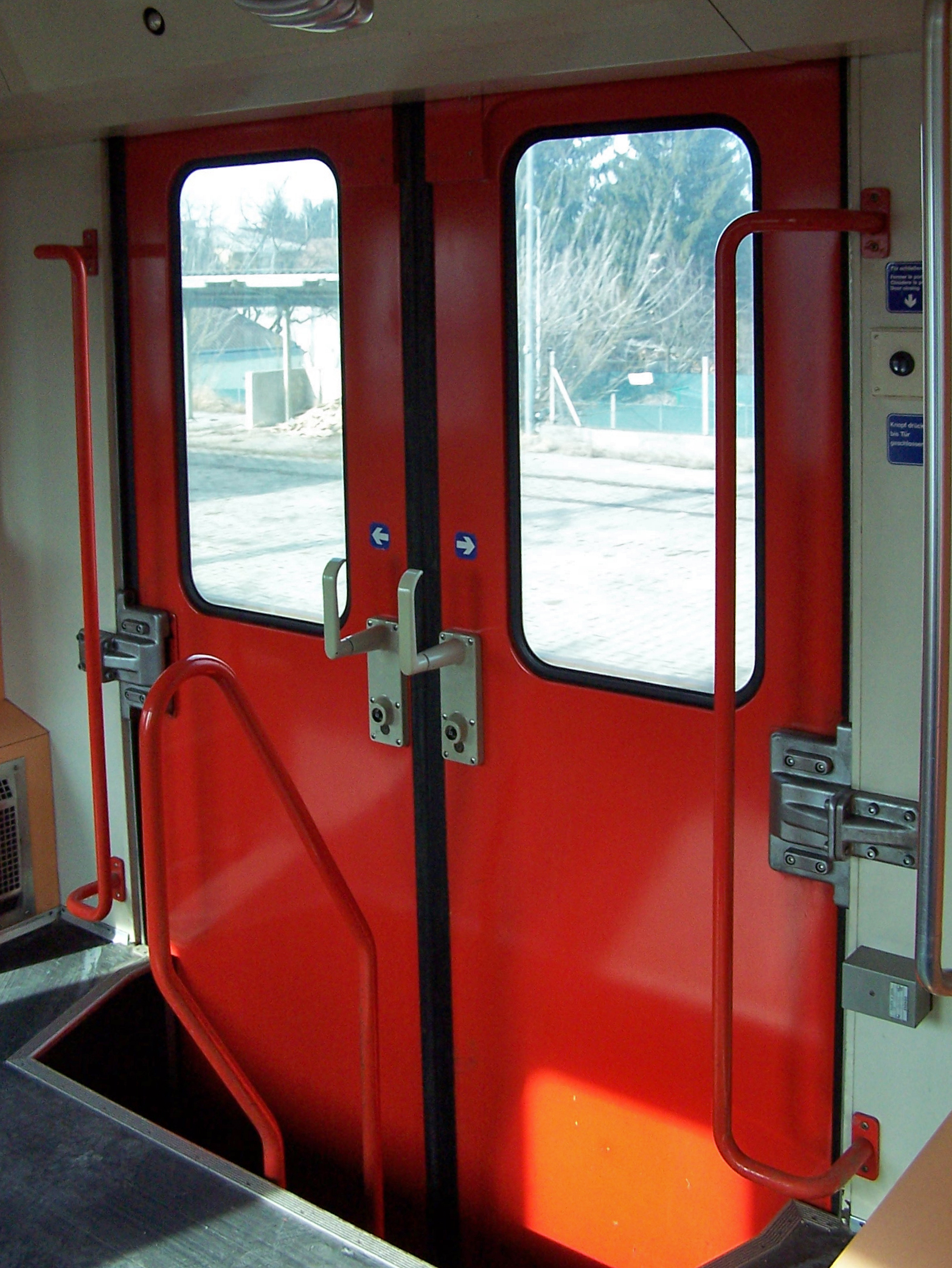
An image of the doors photographed from the interior of the carriage

=== Equipment ===
The open-plan interior includes wide, soft bench seats in a 2+2 arrangement. In the past, the low seats without headrests were often criticized, as the predecessors of the 4030 series were already equipped with headrests from the beginning of the commissioning of the 4020 series, as they were retrofitted for use as a replacement for locomotive-hauled regional trains outside Vienna. However, the seat covers and the headrests retrofitted from 1993 have already been replaced several times with new ones, and the neck rests on the ends of the first headrests were also removed.

The Vorarlberg 4020 sets with the numbers 100 - 120 had tables above the dung bin, but these were partially removed.

The green wall panels of the first series (4020.01-40) were replaced by the manufacturer in the newer series by the orange ones previously tested in the factory on unit 4020.19. The modified headlight arrangement and the different paintwork with a blue roof, which were also present on the 4020.19, did not prevail. In addition, units 4020.01 to 40 had access steps, which were omitted from unit 4020.41 onwards.

The boarding compartments are very large with a width of up to 2600 mm to allow passengers to change quickly. The entrance doors are double-leaf swing and sliding doors and are air-operated. They have a clear width of 1400 mm. The doors are opened and closed centrally from the driver's cabs. Only after release can they be opened by passengers by briefly pulling the snap handle. There are two steps in the door area. Originally, the vehicles had side-selective door control without automatic door closing; the doors were closed by the driver after dispatch (similar to the Vienna subway). In order to prevent the passenger compartment from cooling down during the longer turnaround stops, a button was attached to each door with which the door could be closed.

The windows in the open-plan compartment are 1180 mm wide and are made of safety glass. The passenger compartment in the railcars is ventilated via air ducts in conjunction with the intake from the machine fans. The non-powered carriages are ventilated via roof fans. The passenger compartments are heated by resistance heaters, which used to be infinitely adjustable by the passengers or could be set to continuous operation. The heat output is now controlled by a thermostat, but can still be regulated by the driver if necessary. The driver's cabs are heated with hot air heating. They also have large front windows with tinted glass and a roller curtain. The driver's cabs are also equipped with a hotplate and a refrigerator compartment (6020 only).

=== Toilets ===
The original plan was to convert the toilets to a closed system as part of the main upgrade. However, when the toilet's were moved to the end of the intermediate coach on the railcar side, only the conversion was prepared on most trains. As the newer vehicles in the 4024/4124 series only have one toilet per set, the second downpipe toilet was removed from some of the vehicles without replacement. There are stickers on the toilet doors of most sets stating that the toilet remains closed due to hygienic conditions in the conurbation. However, this is not usually the case, as the driver would have to open or lock it at the last stop before the city limits.

=== Modernization ===
Many details of the units were modernized as part of the main improvements carried out from 1993 onwards: The roller conveyor displays for destination indication with their characteristic blue lettering on a white background were replaced by matrix displays. The interior roller conveyors with the line layout were also removed and all roller conveyor displays were removed from the 2000s onwards, as the control units were not compatible with those of the matrix displays. The doors of all sets were fitted with door area monitoring systems with light barriers, which had previously only been installed on the sets used on the suburban line in Vienna. From now on, a starting interlock also prevented the train from starting with the doors still open, which was necessary for the expansion of one-man operation. The interior was modernized and the paintwork slightly changed (grey-white instead of ivory). From then on, the seat covers were patterned blue/purple, the previously blood-orange door areas and the brown luggage racks and dung bins were traffic lane purple. From 2004, units 4020 281, 283, 294, 296, 297, 299, 300 and 310 to 320 were also repainted in the red/grey diagonal design intended by ÖBB for local transport at that time, which also involved a change to the interior in gray/blue (instead of purple) and new lettering and pictograms. However, some were sparingly modernized and received grey luggage racks and seat frames, but no grey wall cladding. Units 4020 215 and 233 were repainted in the diagonal design a few years after their main upgrade. For this reason, they also retained the interior design of the first modernization. They were also the only sets to carry all 3 liveries. (ivory, gray-white and diagonal design)

From the end of 2002, all sets were also equipped with an emergency brake override (Nahverkehrs-NBÜ) and reclassified as series 4020.2 (the order numbers were raised by 200).

In order to minimize maintenance costs on the one hand and improve visibility for the driver on the other, the trains were equipped with LED headlights between 2014 and 2015.

In 2016, the original door handles were replaced with others and electronic door sensor edges were retrofitted due to requirements for train attendant-free operation. In this context, a visual and acoustic door closing warning was also installed, which is active for every opening and closing process. However, the warning tone previously used to announce the forced closing of all doors was retained.

To increase safety, the intermediate carriage of the 4020 310 (7020 310) set was converted in 2023 and fitted with interior and exterior cameras on a trial basis. According to the interior stickers, this was for scientific purposes.

In September 2023, unit 4020 242 was converted into a disco train to mark the 100th anniversary of the ÖBB company. The seats were removed in 7020 and disco equipment, disco balls, etc. were installed during the special trips.

== Technique ==
=== Running gear and brake ===
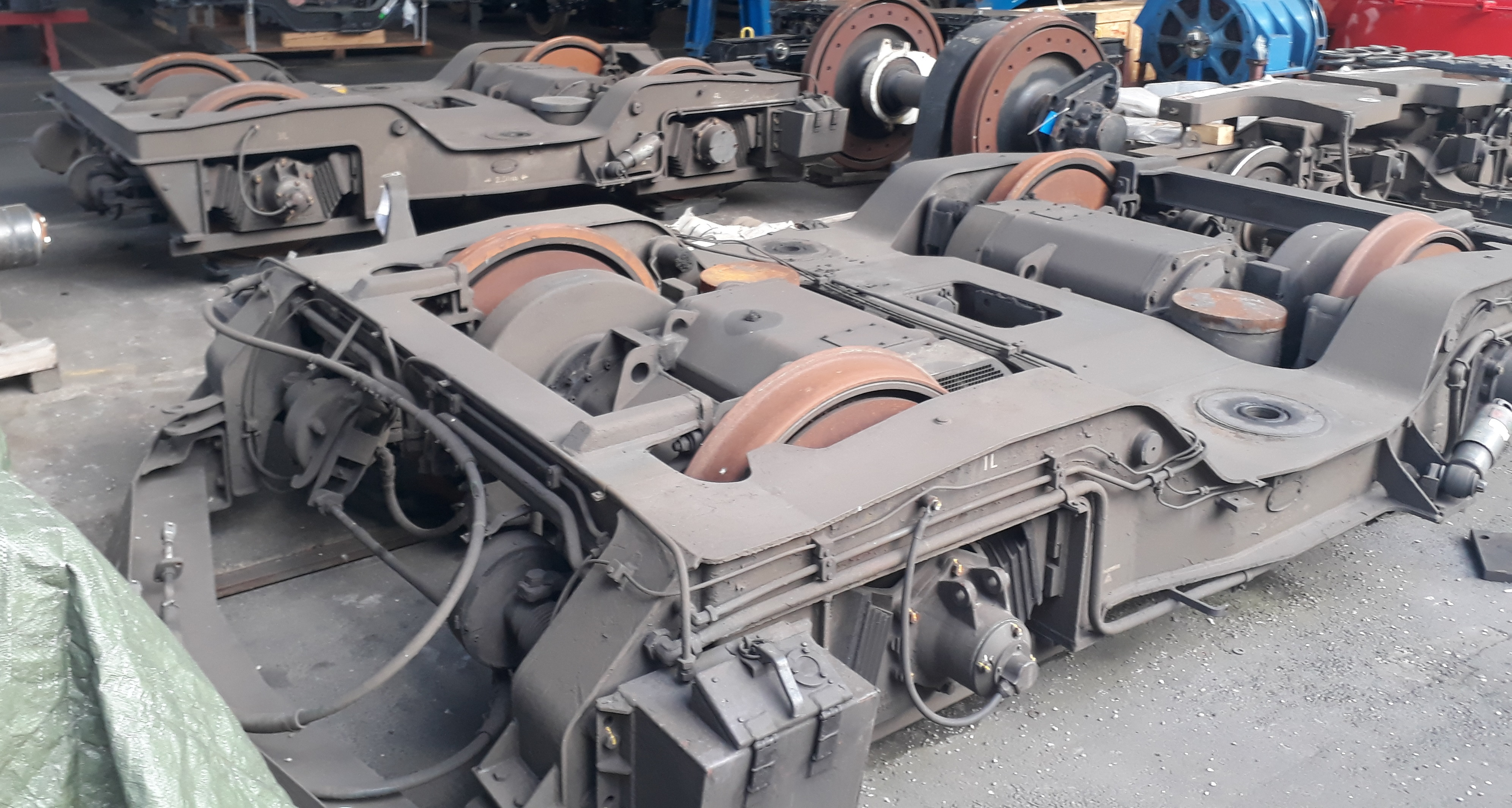
Removed bogies from the Class 4020

Completely new bogies were developed for the units. The motor bogies have a closed frame. The braking and tractive forces are transmitted by a rubber-mounted bogie pivot. The frames of the running bogies are designed as open H-frames; a tractive force link is used for power transmission. The driving wheelsets are braked by wheel disk brakes. There are also block brakes on the driving wheelsets, which have only been used as anti-skid brakes since the main upgrade in 1993. The wheelsets are each fitted with two shaft disk brakes. In addition to the mechanical brakes, the railcars also have an externally excited, thyristor-controlled electrodynamic high-performance resistance brake, which is actuated in addition to the compressed air brake, whereby the brake control primarily accesses the electrodynamic brake. The braking energy generated is converted into heat in the air-cooled braking resistors located on the roof.

The suspension of the bogies to the wheelsets is provided by rubber elements, while the car body is supported on the bogies by air bellows. The air bellows absorb all longitudinal and transverse forces and ensure a constant floor height regardless of the load on the carriages. At the same time, the air pressure of the bellows is used to pre-control the load-dependent brake. A universal Oerlikon railcar brake is used as the braking system. This is a high-performance brake with automatic load-dependent braking. The control valves of this type do not have a control reservoir; instead, a spring preloaded to 4.85 bar serves as a reference. Together with the FVE 751 driver's brake valve, they are also equipped for a directly controlled electropneumatic brake. As a rule, the pneumatic brake is therefore controlled via the three ep control lines, with the air brake of the control and intermediate carriage being controlled first. If this is not sufficient, the air brake of the railcar is also applied. The function of the ep brake is constantly monitored via a safety loop. If this fails, the pressure in the main air line is immediately reduced accordingly, but the electrodynamic brake is then suppressed due to the risk of overbraking. Each bogie has four brake cylinders with a size of 10” for the disc brakes. The motor bogies also have four 8” brake cylinders for actuating the additional block brake. Since the main upgrade, all wheelsets have had axle-selective (previously bogie-selective) electronic wheelslip control. All compressed air equipment is located centrally on a compressed air frame on the respective vehicles.

=== Electric equipment ===
Each railcar is equipped with a contactless thyristor control system; the braking and tractive force is infinitely variable. The vehicle control system ensures smooth acceleration and braking. Thanks to this and other innovations such as automatic travel and brake control (AFB) with automatic start-up, the locomotive driver can devote more time to observing the route and his work is made easier compared to older vehicle control systems. Conventional switching operations are avoided, the power converter consists of an extinguished and an unextinguished bridge. The control electronics, which were supplied by AEG, are located in the driver's cab of the railcar.

The railcar is driven by four mixed-current traction motors with an output of 300 kW each. This achieves a starting tractive force of 117 kN. The electrodynamic brake achieves a braking force of 100 kN. The traction motors are housed in the bogie frame in a tatz bearing design and are supported by rubber layer springs. The motors are ventilated by a combination of self-ventilation and forced ventilation. They are driven on one side by a helical-toothed spring-mounted large wheel.

Two type VI half-scissor pantographs and a compressed air quick-action switch as the main switch are located on the railcar above the rear bogie; the primary voltage transformer and the overvoltage arrester are also located there. Between 1994 and 1997, the second half-scissor pantograph was removed as part of the installation of a parking circuit, which makes it possible to change the driver's cab without lowering the pantograph. The fans for the transformer and the traction motors as well as the braking resistors for the electric resistance brake are still housed on the roof. The other parts of the electrical equipment are located under the carriage floor between the bogies. These are the transformer with the oil coolers, the rectifier bridges of the power rectifier with the respective fans, the battery and equipment box, charger, air compressor and their air tanks.

The intermediate and control cars are supplied with energy for heating and battery charging via a train busbar, and there is also a battery busbar for the safe supply of the ep brake. The control commands are transmitted within the train set via multiple cables, between multiple-controlled multiple units via the electrical contacts on the Scharfenberg coupler. This makes it possible to control up to four railcars from one driver's cab.

== Use ==
=== Current use ===
Nowadays, the use of railcars is manageable and concentrates on the Vienna metropolitan area and individual extensions of the Vienna express line. Their share in this network now only accounts for a small proportion of the total number of trains in operation, but the railcars are still indispensable, especially as replacement sets or booster trains. From 2005 to 2017, almost all units of the 4020 series were used by the Vienna S-Bahn.

As planned, the railcars are only used on local services. With the timetable change in December 2023, the rotations of this series were rescheduled. The planning, which previously only comprised nine circulation days and was concentrated on a few lines, which resulted in a rather high proportion of unscheduled operations, was abandoned. The new timetable requires 28 trainsets daily and includes almost all rapid transit lines whose vehicles are provided from Floridsdorf. Series 4020 railcars are also running again as planned on some regional train and regional express connections.

If there is a shortage of vehicles, all available trainsets are used.

== Retirement ==
Railcar 4020 065 was withdrawn after an accident at Sierndorf on the Nordwestbahn on November 3, 2002, and scrapped the following year.

=== First wave of retirements (2016-2019) ===
In January 2016, two sets (4020 218 and 223) were withdrawn for the first time without any further incidents as they were replaced by 4746 series units. Since the 4746 series entered series production, units have been withdrawn in tranches and replaced by 4746 series units.

In 2017, five (211, 213, 222, 224, 226) were sold to Ferotrans, leaving for Romania in July 2017.

Since spring 2019, the sets that had been parked for some time were scrapped in Vienna-Jedlersdorf. Decommissioned sets were continuously transferred to Vienna-Jedlersdorf and subsequently scrapped. The first was the blue/red mixed set 4020 252/7020 315/6020 315, the second set 4020 269, other sets followed.

=== Reactivations (2019-2020) ===
Due to problems with the newly commissioned 4746 series trains and the leasing of several sets to the German ODEG as well as a shortage of railcars, several 4020 series units that had already been decommissioned have been reactivated since 2019. This began with the 4020 228, followed by the 4020 240 and 207. Further sets followed as more sets were needed due to the expansion of local transport services. However, this reactivation of the railcars ended at the beginning of 2020.

=== Second wave of retirements (2020-2023) ===
From the timetable change on December 13, 2020, numerous units were withdrawn and in some cases scrapped. One reason for the decommissioning was the purchase of new 4746 series multiple units. Another reason was the end of the approval of traction units without PZB90 on-board equipment on 1 January 2022. As some multiple units (as can be seen in the info box) are not equipped with this on-board equipment, they will be decommissioned as a result.

On 9 January 2021, unit 4020 207 was used for the last time. This was followed around two months later by 4020 250 and 256, and in the same month, on 31 March, five more sets were decommissioned. These were the sets 4020 212, 215, 221, 232 and 280. 4020 264 was taken out of service on 19 April 2021.

On May 1, 2021, 4020 238 and 240 were the last units with green wall cladding to be used in passenger service. In the same month, the three railcars 4020 295, 253 and 290 were taken out of service, followed by 4020 274 on June 2. On July 9, 2021, unit 4020 260 was retired. Despite a now noticeable shortage of traction units, unit 4020 255 (the second oldest 4020 at the time) was taken out of service on August 3, 2021, and 4020 275 two days later. Shortly before the timetable change in December 2021, unit 4020 273 was withdrawn after the 130th railcar of series 4746 had been approved for passenger service. On 15 November 2022, 35 of the original 120 units were still in active service. The oldest unit still in service at this time was unit 4020 242, which was commissioned in 1981. 4020 301 was withdrawn with the timetable change in December 2022. In April 2023, numerous sets parked in Vienna-Jedlersdorf and Floridsdorf were transferred to Romania for scrapping.

After the set 4020 242 was converted into a disco train and is therefore no longer used in local transport, it has been parked, but is still in the fleet as a disco train. The sets 4020 287, 298 and 317 were finally withdrawn in 2023, leaving 29 units still in passenger service in 2024.

The last 29 sets will be retired by July 3, 2026.

== Cult status ==
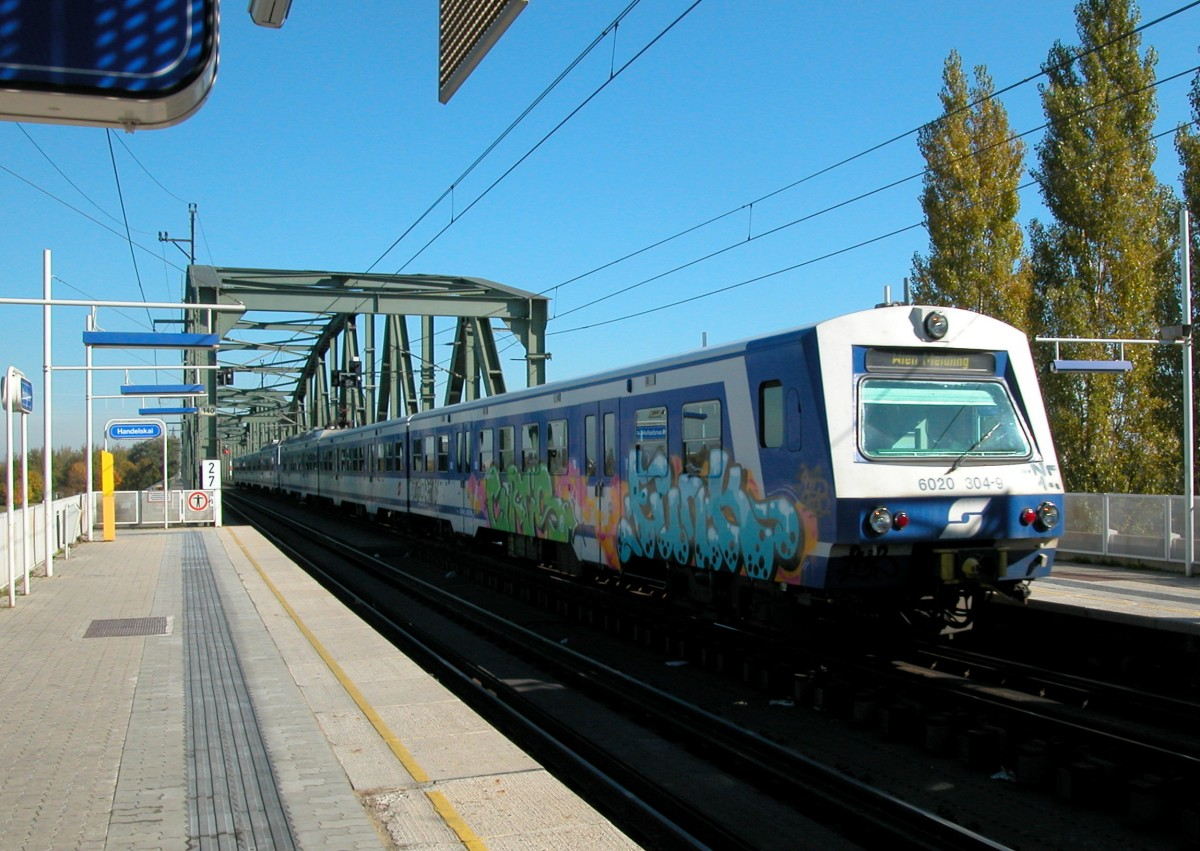
A 6020 control car decorated with graffiti, in service on the S1 at Handelskai station, 2010

During its operation the ÖBB 4020 gained something of a cult status amongst Vienna's graffiti artists. The first Class 4020 was painted with graffiti in November 1989 at Floridsdorf, but it is unclear if the train subsequently went into service before being cleaned. With its increasing withdrawal from service from 2016, graffiti artists began to specifically target the remaining rolling stock with increased intensity, including attempts to paint trains which, until 2019, operated through Wien Hauptbahnhof.
