= Let L-200 Morava =

Two-engine touring and light passenger aircraft of the 1960s

L-200 Morava
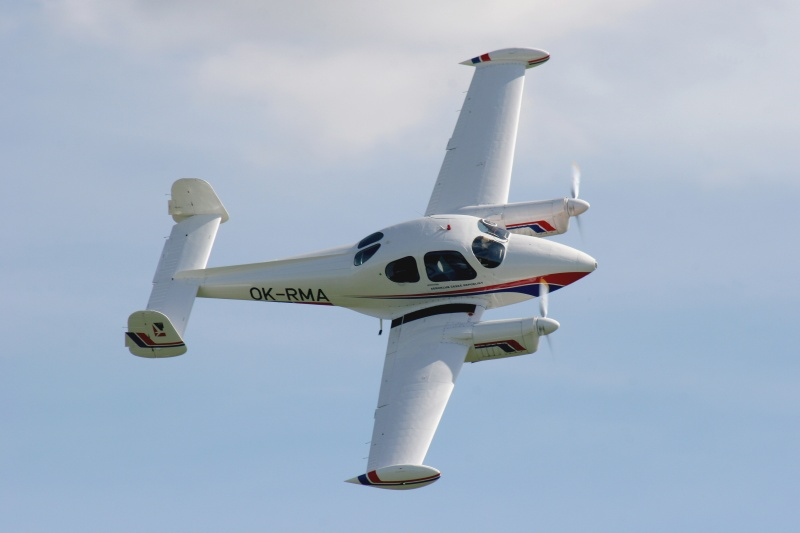

General information
- Type: Touring / utility aircraft
- Role: civilian and light transport roles
- Manufacturer: Let
- Designer: Milan Křeček, Czech aircraft manufacturer Let Kunovice
- Status: In service with private individuals
- Primary users: Czechoslovakia USSR, Poland
- Number built: 367

History
- Manufactured: 1957-1964
- First flight: 9 April 1957

The Let L-200 Morava is a two-engine touring and light passenger aircraft of the 1960s, designed and produced by Let Kunovice in the Czech Republic.

== Development ==
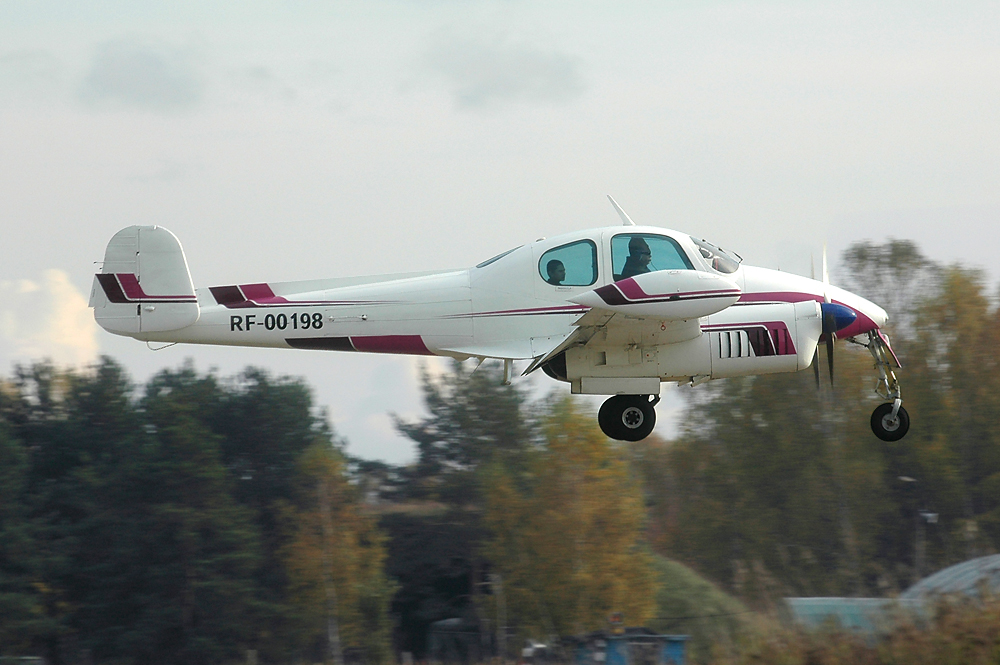
Let L-200D Morava on landing

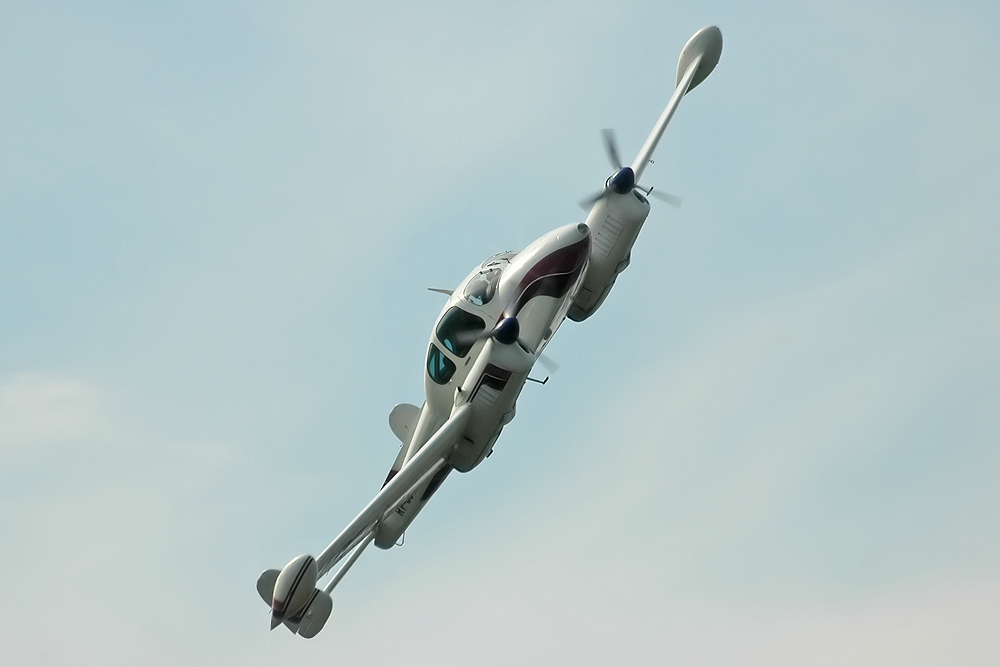
Let L-200D Morava banking

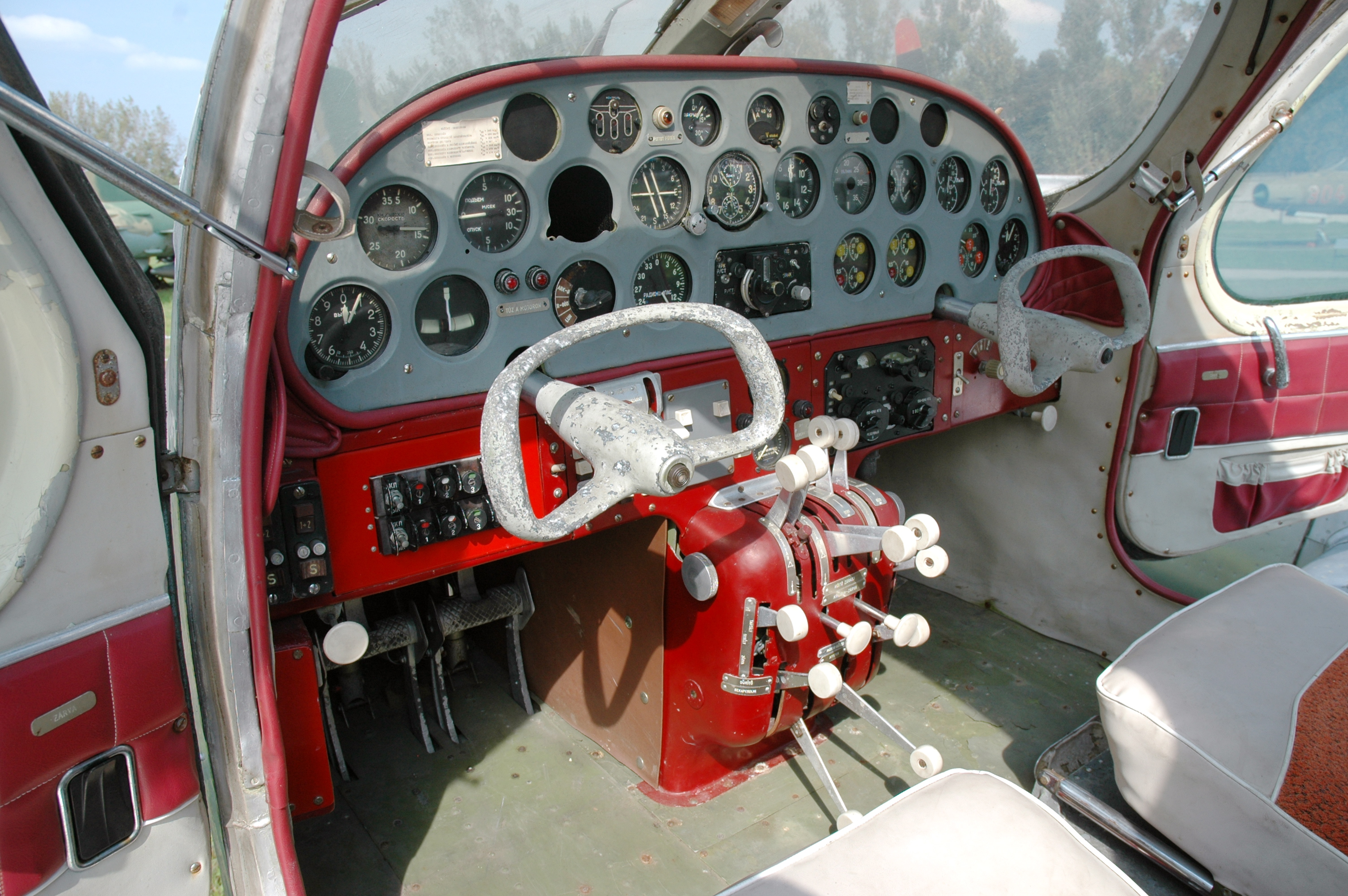
cockpit of L-200D Morava

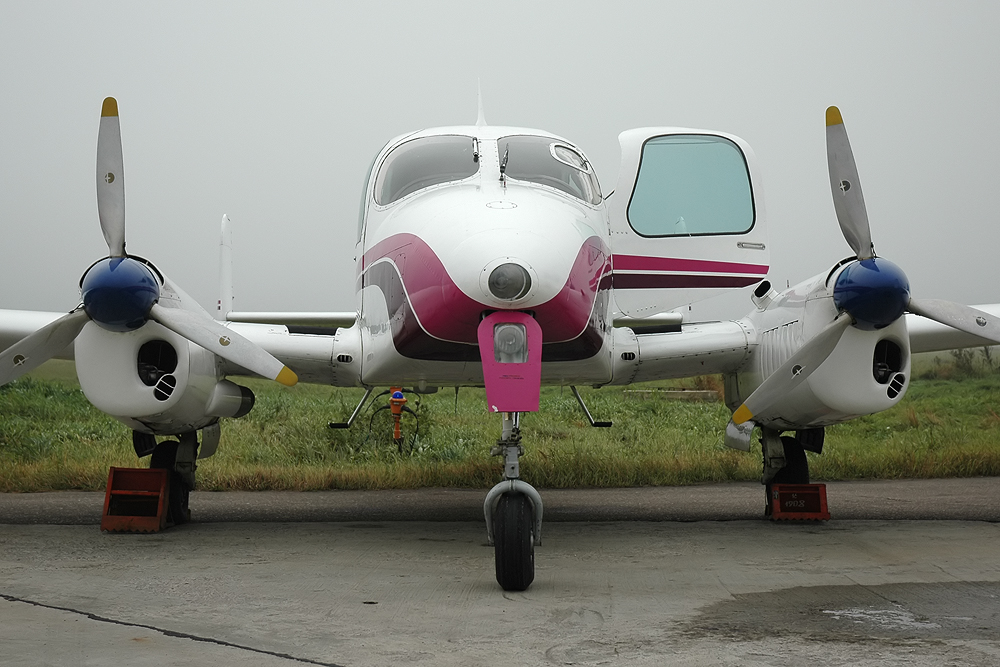
Let L-200D Morava at Kubinka air base

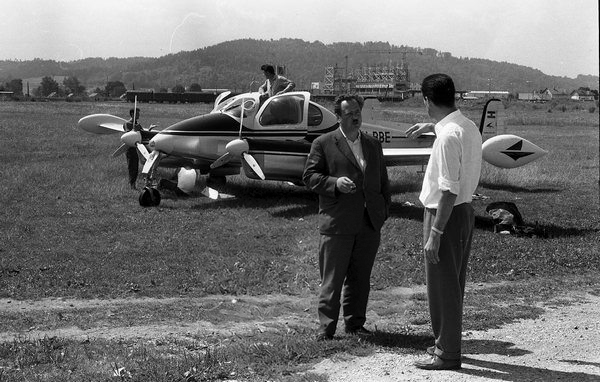
Representatives of the Ljubljana company Libis handed over to the representatives of the Zagreb company Pan-Adria the first of a series of five aircraft Morava L 2000D - LIBIS 1964

The Let L-200 Morava light twin-engine transport was preceded in production at the Let factory by the license-built Aero Ae 45. In 1955 the newly created design team led by Ladislav Smrcek of the Czechoslovak State Aircraft Factory decided to proceed with a proprietary design for a more modern twin with seating capacity of five and powered by a pair of then new 210 hp Avia M 337 engines, but as they were not yet available, the prototype made do with the less powerful Walter Minor 6-III engines of 160 hp each. While maintaining similar characteristics of western twin engine aircraft of the time, updated features of the Morava included twin tails, standard thermal wing de-icing equipment and inverted inline engines.

Three prototypes were built. The first, designated XL-200 (OK-LNA) made its maiden flight on 9 April 1957. It was followed in flight testing by the second prototype (OK-LNB) while the third was used for static testing. The aircraft sported clean, elegant lines. During the same year the factory built a run of 10 pre-production L-200s, one of these aircraft undergoing government flight testing in 1958. The program was successful, and the airplane was ordered into full-scale production. One L-200 was converted into a prototype of the M-337-powered production model L-200A. This aircraft incorporated minor changes, consisting mostly of new two-blade V-410 propellers, a cockpit lowered by 43mm, a modified tailfin design as well as longer engine nacelles. It was completed in 1959 and shown at the Paris Air Show in July of that year. The aircraft underwent government trials in the fall of 1959, having been fitted with M-337 engines. The trials once again proved successful and were completed the following July. The first production L-200A took to the skies in February 1960.

L-200B and C models were not produced. The second production variant was the L-200D, modified according to Soviet Aeroflot demands. It was fitted with new three-blade propellers V-506 of a smaller diameter and some minor improvements, such as dust filters. It also received more comprehensive navigation equipment. The prototype (OK-NIA) was converted from the L-200A prototype in 1960 and tested in 1961-1963.

In all, 367 L-200s were built by 1964, including 3 prototypes and 197 L-200D (eight L-200A and the L-200A prototype were converted to L-200D as well). 5 aircraft were manufactured from parts by Libis in Yugoslavia.

A further development was 6-place L-210 (also known as L-201; registration OK-PHB), converted from one L-200D in 1966, powered with 245 hp M-338 engines, but it was not ordered by the airlines and was not produced.

== Operational Service ==
The pre-series aircraft L-200 were distributed for testing: 5 to the Czechoslovak airline Agrolet (OK-MEA - MEE), 2 to the Czechoslovak Air Force and 2 to Aeroflot in the Soviet Union.

Aeroflot, which used them as air taxis, was the largest single user of Moravas – 68 L-200A and 113 L-200D, with final deliveries taking place in 1966. In the 1970s however, the Soviet Union sold or withdrew its aircraft from use, in favour of indigenous designs.

About 100 Moravas were used for civilian purposes in Czechoslovakia by aeroclubs Svazarm (about 50), the airlines Agrolet (from 1969 Slov-Air) and Czechoslovak Airlines (45) and by businesses, such as Škoda. 20 were used by the Czechoslovak Air Force (16 of which L-200A), among others, for training. About 50 were sold to Poland, where they were used mostly as air ambulances and in aeroclubs. Some other countries had smaller fleets of Moravas.

During the Cold War Era, not many light aircraft were exported from behind the Iron Curtain. 144 L-200A were exported to 15 countries. They were used in Australia, Argentina, Cuba, Hungary, West Germany, Great Britain, Egypt, India, Italy, Poland, South Africa, USSR and Yugoslavia. The L-200D was exported to Bulgaria, Cuba, Egypt, France, Hungary, GDR, Great Britain, India, Indonesia, Italy, Poland, Switzerland, Sweden, Soviet Union and Yugoslavia.

A small number of Moravas are still used (as of 2008), mainly in the Czech Republic, Slovakia, Poland and Ukraine.

== Operators ==
Australia

- Ansett ANA

Bulgaria

- Bulgarian Air Force

Cuba

- Cuban Air Force

Czechoslovakia

- Czechoslovak Air Force
- Czech Airlines
- Government of Czechoslovakia
- Slov-Air

Hungary

- Hungarian Ambulance Services
- National Hydrological Service
- Hungarian Police – from 1960 until 1978

Soviet Union

- Aeroflot

Yugoslavia

- Federal Aviation Service

== Specifications (L-200D) ==
Data from Jane's All The World's Aircraft 1966–67

General characteristics

- Crew: 1
- Capacity: 4 passengers
- Length: 8.61 m (28 ft 3 in)
- Wingspan: 12.31 m (40 ft 5 in)
- Height: 2.25 m (7 ft 5 in)
- Wing area: 17.28 m^{2} (186.0 sq ft)
- Empty weight: 1,330 kg (2,932 lb)
- Max takeoff weight: 1,950 kg (4,299 lb)
- Fuel capacity: 420 L (110 US gal; 92 imp gal)
- Powerplant: 2 × Walter M337 air-cooled six-cylinder straight engine, 160 kW (210 hp) each
- Propellers: 3-bladed Type V506 constant-speed, 1.75 m (5 ft 9 in) diameter

Performance

- Maximum speed: 290 km/h (180 mph, 160 kn) at sea level
- Cruise speed: 256 km/h (159 mph, 138 kn) at 2,500 m (8,200 ft) (econ cruise)
- Range: 1,710 km (1,060 mi, 920 nmi)
- Service ceiling: 5,700 m (18,700 ft)
- Rate of climb: 6.4 m/s (1,260 ft/min)
- Takeoff distance to 15 m (50 ft): 390 m (1,280 ft)
- Landing distance from 15 m (50 ft): 480 m (1,570 ft)

== See also ==
Aircraft of comparable role, configuration, and era

- Aero Ae 45
- Beagle B.206
- Beechcraft Baron
- Britten Sheriff
- Cessna 310
- Piper Aztec
- SGP M-222 Flamingo
