= Britten Sheriff =

British light aircraft project

Sheriff
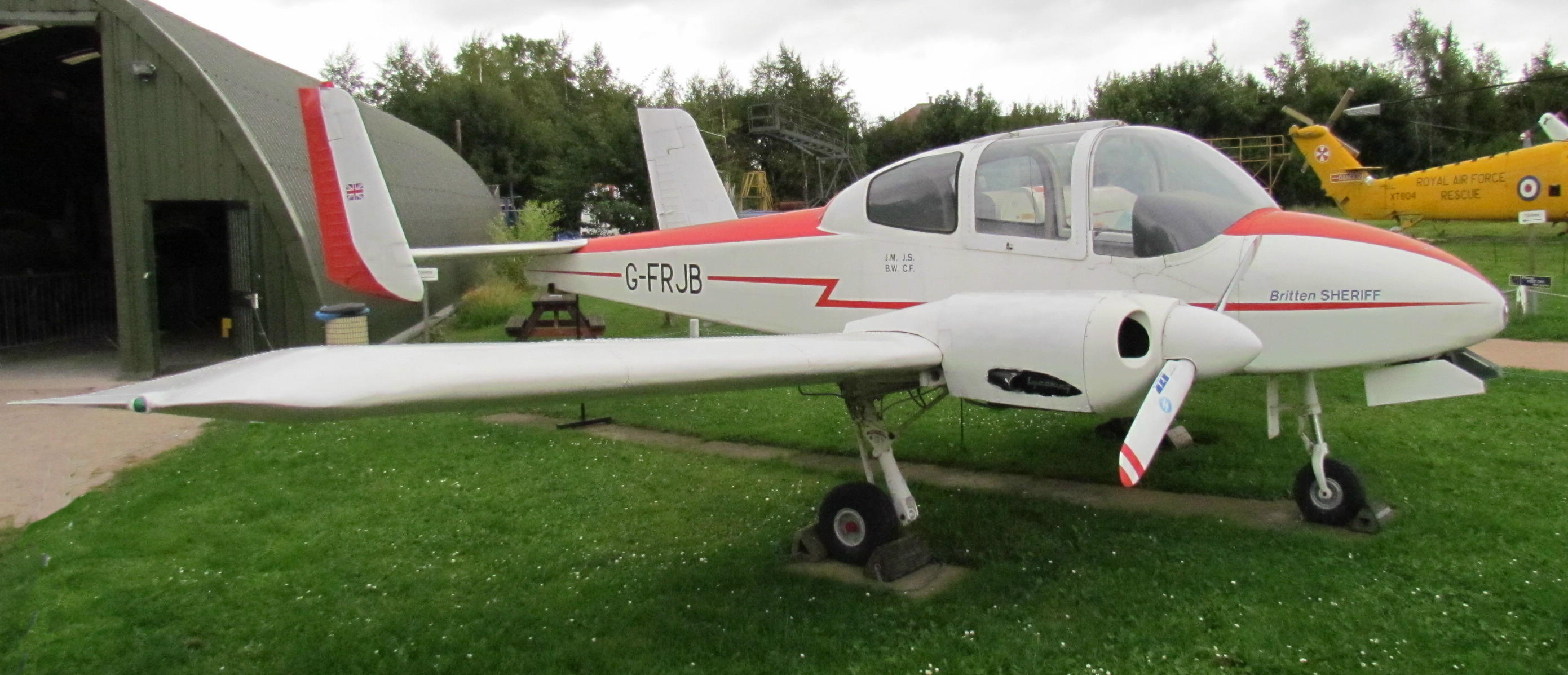

General information
- Type: Civil utility aircraft
- Status: Abandoned project
- Number built: 1 (incomplete)

The Britten Sheriff SA-1 was a light twin-piston engine aircraft developed in the United Kingdom in the 1970s. It was intended to be produced outside of the UK, but the company went into receivership in 1984 and the aircraft was never completed.

== Development ==
Aircraft engineer John Britten, who had been instrumental in founding Britten-Norman, left the company in February 1976. After that, he began development of an economical four-place light twin aircraft, the Sheriff. It was a low-wing cantilever monoplane with twin tails and a tractor engine in a nacelle on each wing. Of all-metal construction (with a fiberglass nose section on the fuselage), it was fitted with fixed tricycle undercarriage and accommodated the pilot and three passengers under a bubble canopy.

Britten planned two versions of the aircraft, a two-place trainer and a four-place touring aircraft. Target price of the trainer was £25,000 and of the touring version was £29,000. By comparison, at that time the price of the Piper PA-34 Seneca was around £58,000. Development was to be in UK with production licences then sold worldwide.

The project team included Denis Berryman (chief designer for the Sheriff and former chief designer at Britten-Norman), Maurice Brennan (formerly of Hawker, Saro and Vickers), Ken Mills (former production director at B-N, and before that chief production engineer at Vickers).

Sheriff Aerospace went into receivership in 1984 with the aircraft said to be nearly complete. Although Centrul National Aeronautic of Romania was interested in producing the aircraft it could not fund development. The prototype (registered G-FRJB) was never completed, and in 1986, was acquired by East Midlands Aeropark at East Midlands Airport. As of 2009 the prototype is preserved there and has since been restored as the only of its type in the world.

== Specifications (4-seater version, as designed) ==
Data from Jane's All The World's Aircraft 1982–83

General characteristics

- Crew: One pilot
- Capacity: 3 passengers
- Length: 6.98 m (22 ft 11 in)
- Wingspan: 10.06 m (33 ft 0 in)
- Wing area: 13.94 m^{2} (150.0 sq ft)
- Aspect ratio: 7.26:1
- Airfoil: NACA 23015
- Empty weight: 855 kg (1,885 lb)
- Max takeoff weight: 1,338 kg (2,950 lb)
- Fuel capacity: 277 L (61 imp gal; 73 US gal)
- Powerplant: 2 × Lycoming O-320-D1A horizontally-opposed four-cylinder piston engine, 120 kW (160 hp) each
- Propellers: 2-bladed fully feathering constant speed propeller, 1.83 m (6 ft 0 in) diameter

Performance

- Maximum speed: 278 km/h (173 mph, 150 kn)
- Cruise speed: 254 km/h (158 mph, 137 kn) at 75% power
- Range: 1,075 km (668 mi, 580 nmi)
- Rate of climb: 6.6 m/s (1,300 ft/min)
- Take-off run to 50 ft (15 m): 456 m (1,496 ft)
- Landing run from 50 ft (15 m): 527 m (1,729 ft)

== See also ==
Aircraft of comparable role, configuration, and era

- Let L-200 Morava
