= Simmering-Graz-Pauker =

Austrian manufacturing company

Coordinates: 48°10′43″N 16°24′16″E

Simmering-Graz-Pauker AG
- Company type: Public
- Industry: Conglomerate
- Predecessor: Grazer Maschinen- und Waggonbau-Aktiengesellschaft; Maschinen- und Waggonbau-Fabriks-Aktiengesellschaft in Simmering; Paukerwerk
- Founded: 1941
- Defunct: 1989
- Fate: Acquired by Siemens
- Headquarters: Vienna, Austria
- Products: Steel products, train technologies, rail vehicles and engines, marine systems, ship-building, energy systems

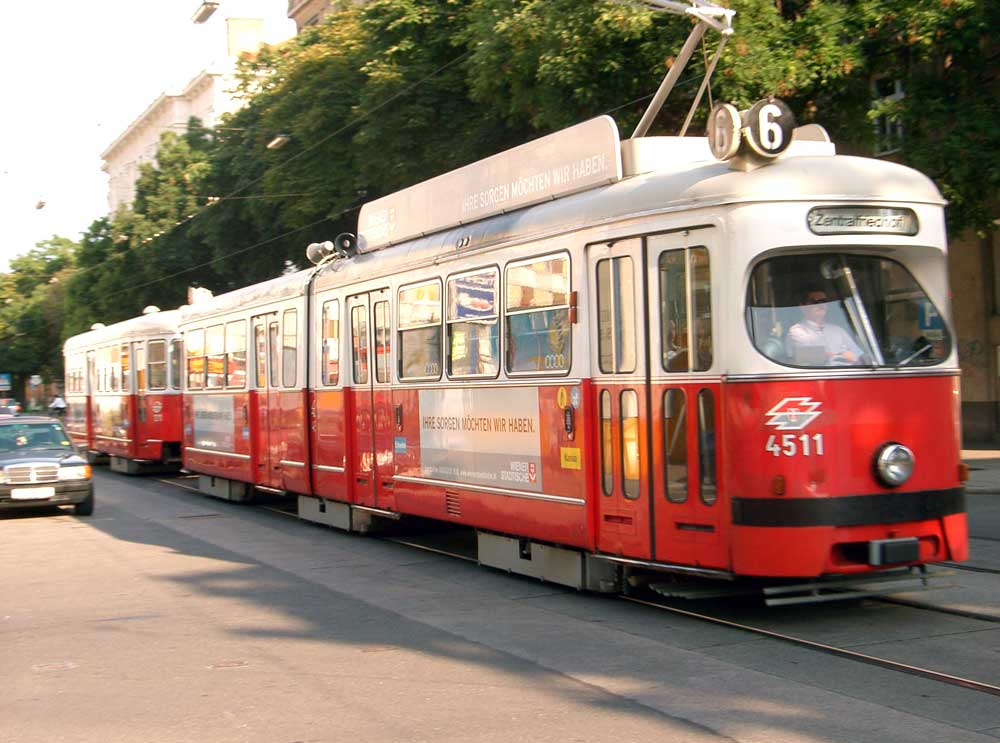
A Vienna tram built by SGP

Simmering-Graz-Pauker AG (SGP), founded as Simmering-Graz-Pauker AG für Maschinen-, Kessel- und Waggonbau, was an important Austrian machine and engine factory, manufacturing: machinery, boilers and rail vehicles. It was established in 1941 through the merger of Simmering machinery and rolling stock company with the Graz machine and rolling stock company and the Paukerwerkstraße Corporation from Vienna. It was separated in 1989 into two divisions; SGP-VA Energie- und Umwelttechnik for power systems and SGP Verkehrstechnik for rail vehicles. The former became part of the Austrian Industries Technologies company and later became Austrian Energy & Environment, while the rail business was acquired by Siemens in the 1990s. It traded as Siemens SGP Verkehrstechnik before being fully merged into Siemens Austria in 2009.

== History ==
After World War II the company was majority owned by the state and had a wide network of international offices and subsidiaries in Asia, South America and Europe with several thousand employees. The company experienced rapid growth until the mid-1980s.

SGP ceased to exist as an independent company in 1989 as part of the restructuring of the state-owned Österreichische Industrieholding (ÖIAG), when the former was renamed as SGP Verkehrstechnik GmbH. In 1992, the Republic of Austria sold 26% of its shares in SGP to Siemens, and in 1993 another 48% of SGP's shares were again sold to Siemens. The company then operated until 1996 as a "Siemens SGP GmbH", later renamed "Transport GmbH Siemens SGP", but this name was dropped after 1 April 2004. Until 30 September 2009 the former factories of SGP were part of Siemens Mobility.

On 1 October 2009, the company was converted to a stock corporation and has since been trading as Siemens AG Austria. On 16 September 2006, the plant in Vienna-Simmering celebrated its 175th anniversary. As part of Siemens, the factories were transformed from full-range suppliers to specialised centers of excellence. The Graz factory is now involved in the design and manufacturing of trucks and other specialised chassis while the factory in Vienna manufactures metro rolling stock and trams. In addition, rail vehicles are being designed and developed at both locations and then manufactured in other plants.

== Products ==
The focus was on energy technology for the construction of turbines and boilers to complete power plants and transportation technology for the construction of diesel engines, carriages and locomotives for the ÖBB, as well as vehicles for the Vienna and Graz transport systems (trams, metro ("Silver Arrow" and "V-wagon"), trains).

=== Aircraft ===
During the 1950s Simmering-Graz-Pauker A.G. developed the SGP M-222 Flamingo, their first aircraft. It was a conventional twin engine monoplane, smaller than many but seating four in two rows.

The first prototype flew for the first time on 15 May 1959 but was lost in a fatal crash during single engine tests on 2 August 1959. Development work continued on a second aircraft which first flew in 1960 and a third followed in 1962. The fourth aircraft, now renamed the "Simmering-Graz-Pauker SGP.222" was intended as a production prototype and demonstrator and appeared at the 1964 Hamburg show, though it turned out to be the last of the line. At the end of 1964 the program was terminated and the three surviving examples scrapped.

From 1985 to 1991 SGP was the parent company of Hoffman Aircraft Limited.

== Images ==
Examples of SGP vehicles

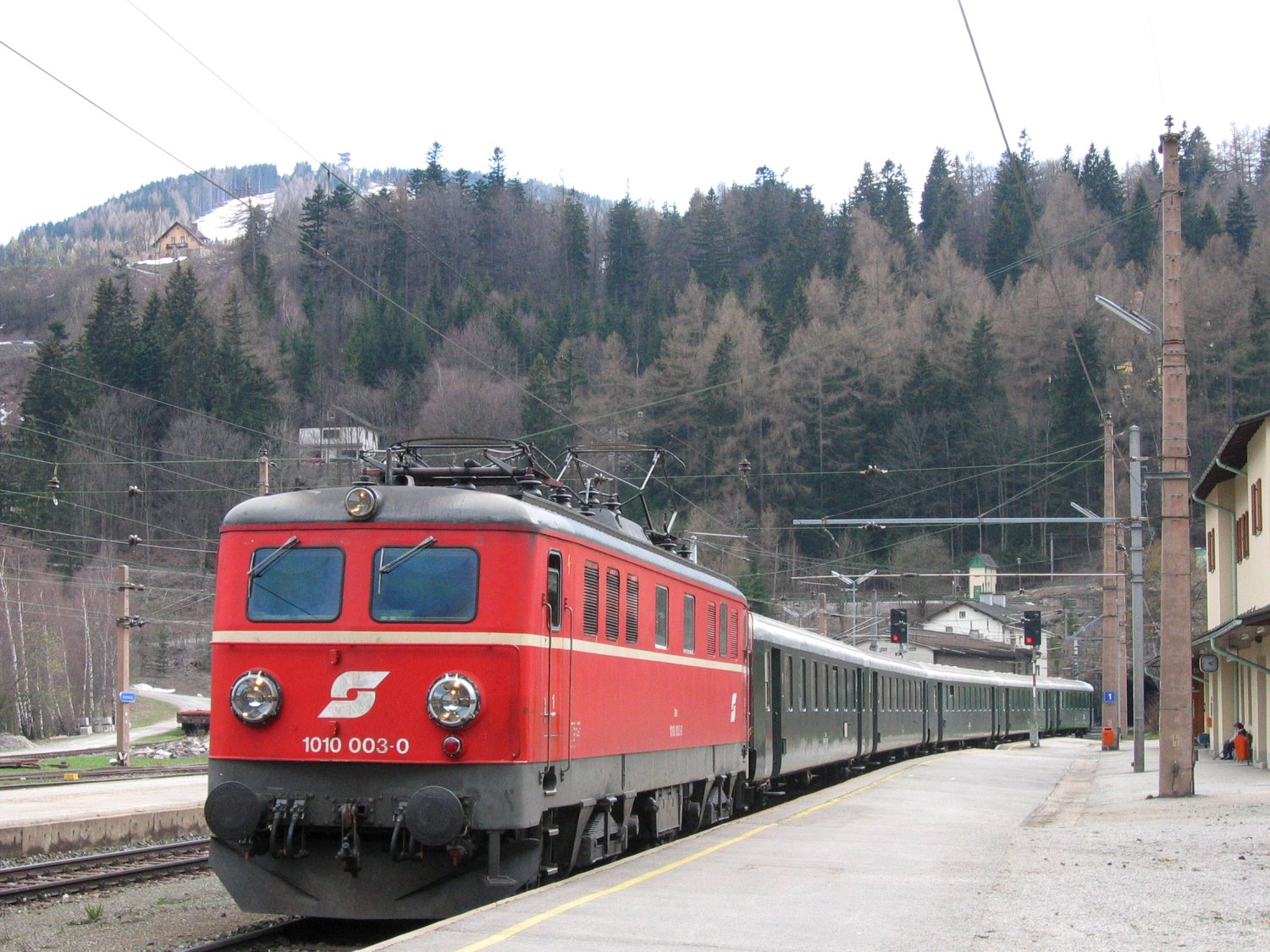
ÖBB electric locomotive 1010 003-0

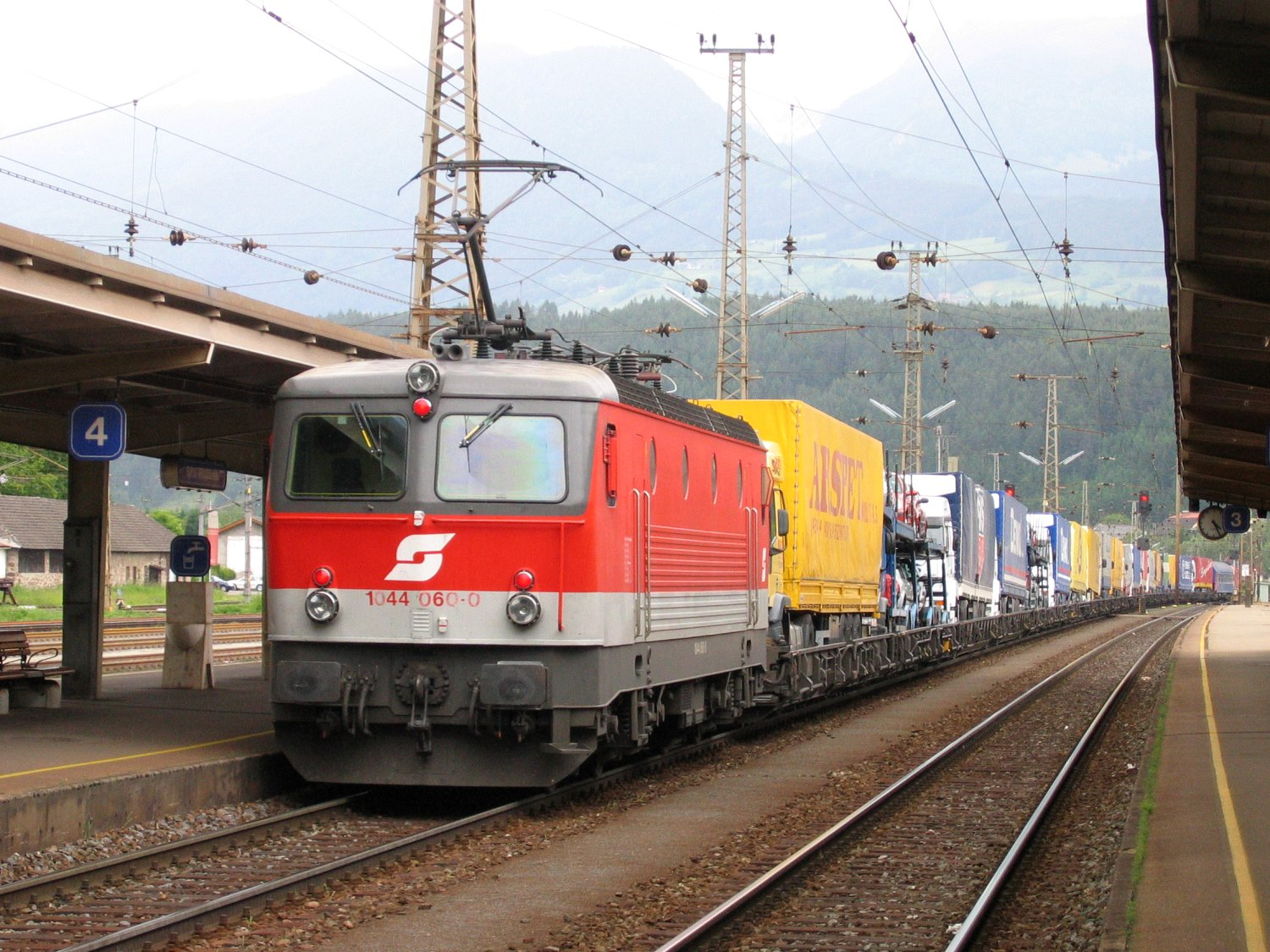
ÖBB electric locomotive 1044 060-0

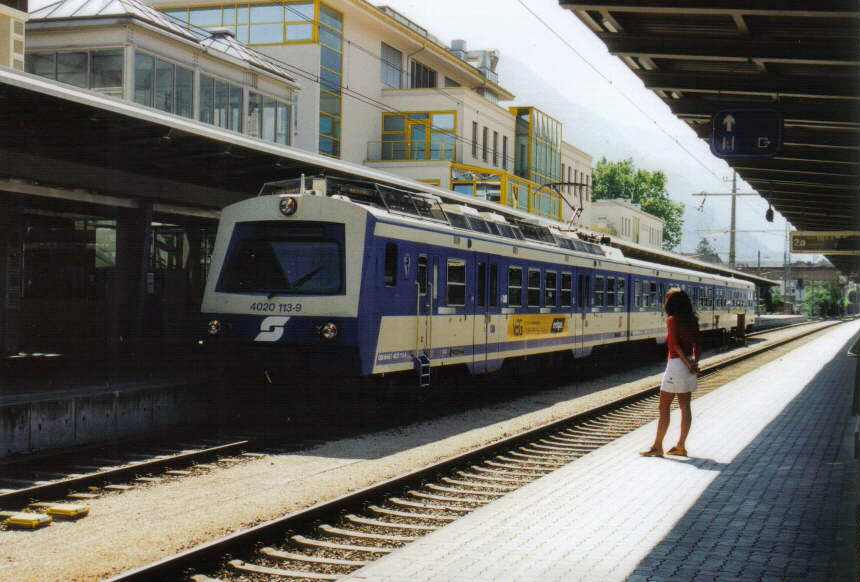
ÖBB class 4020 S-Bahn train

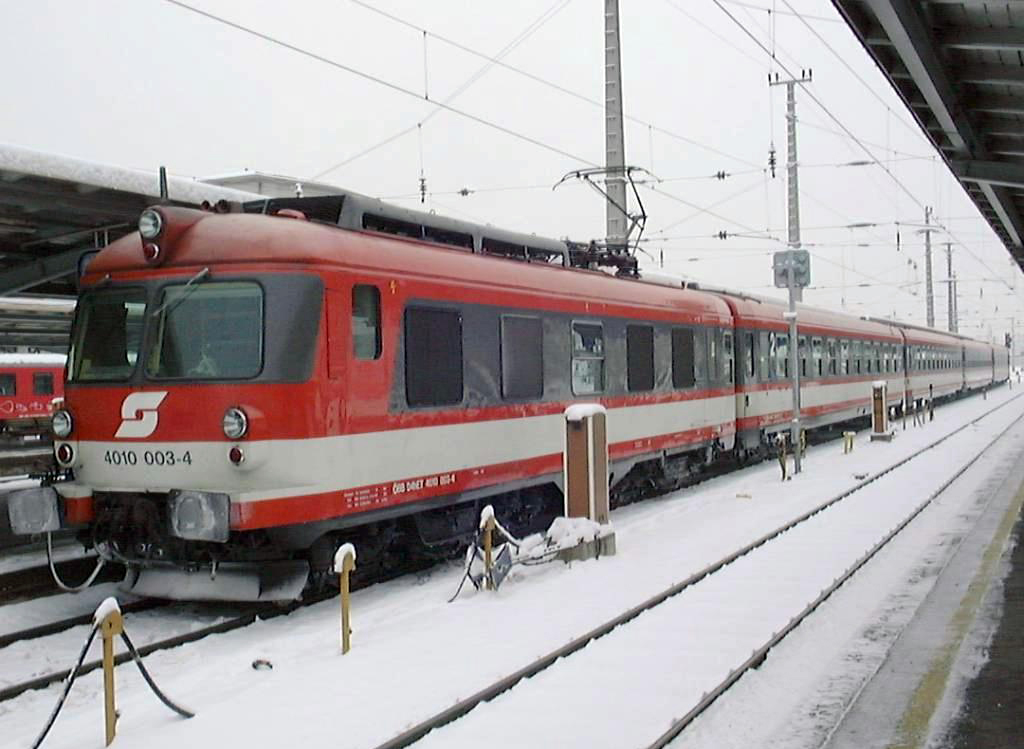
ÖBB class 4010 (modified) train in Graz

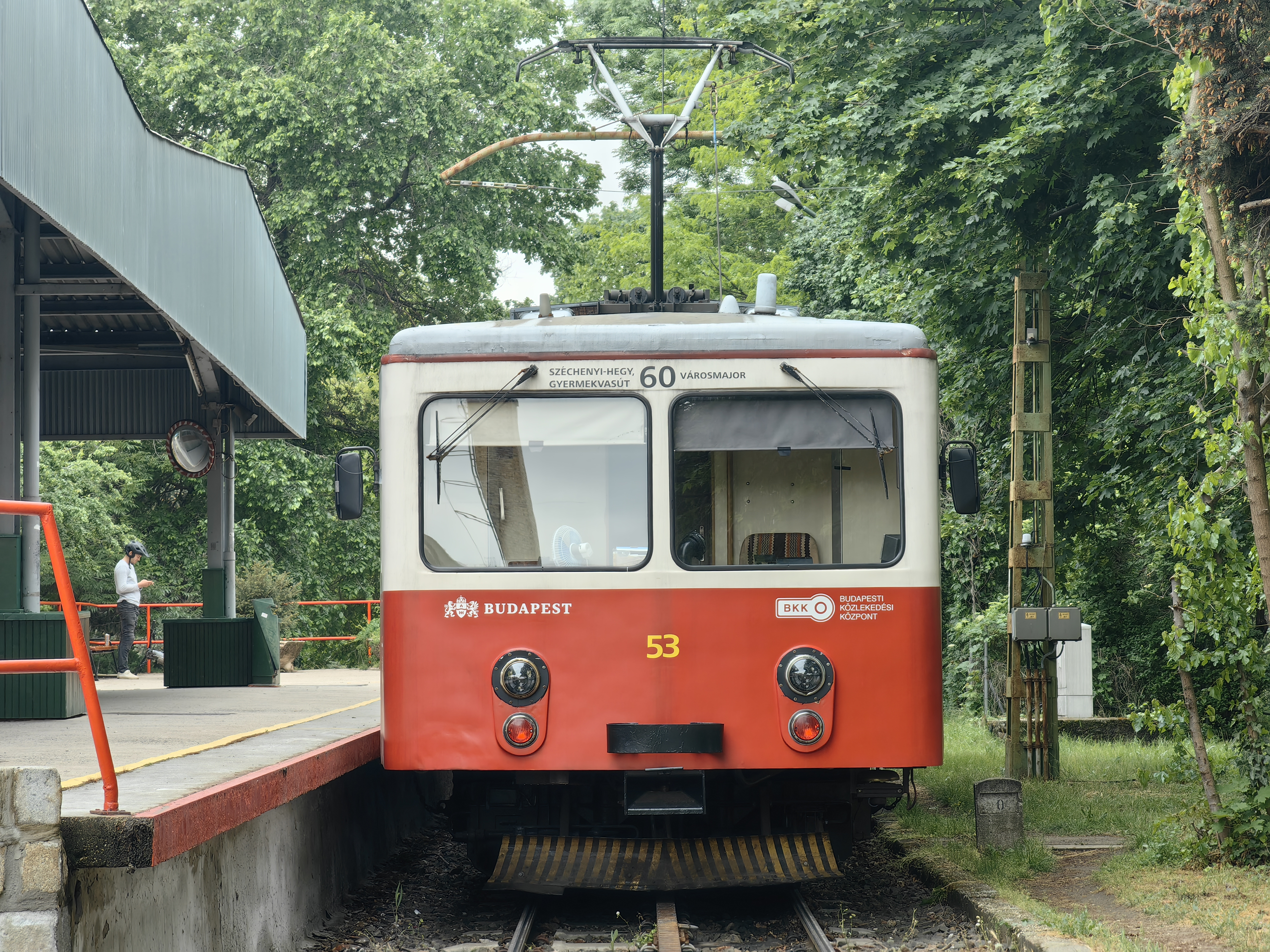
Budapest Cog-wheel Railway multiple unit train

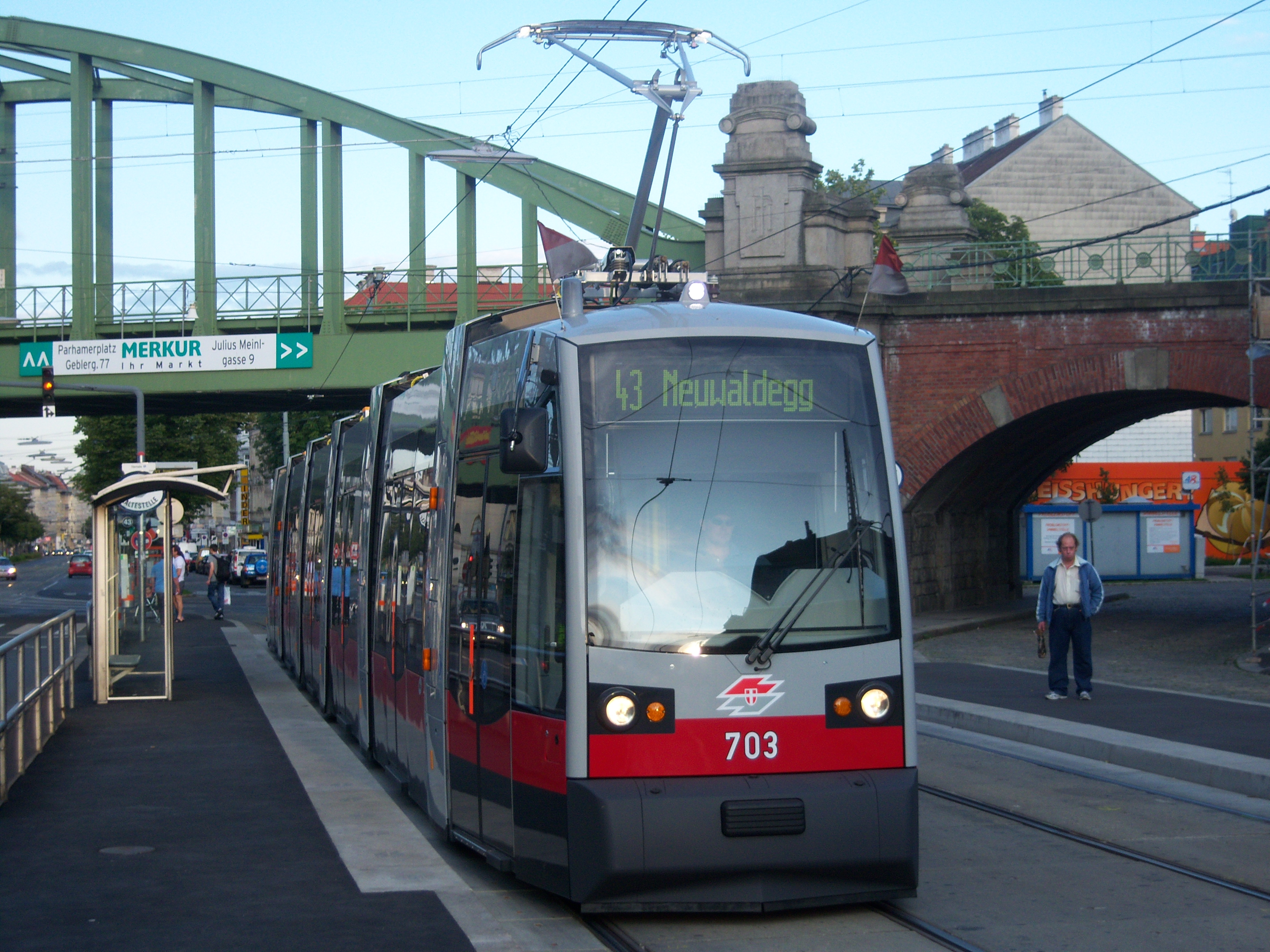
Vienna tram type ULF B_{1}

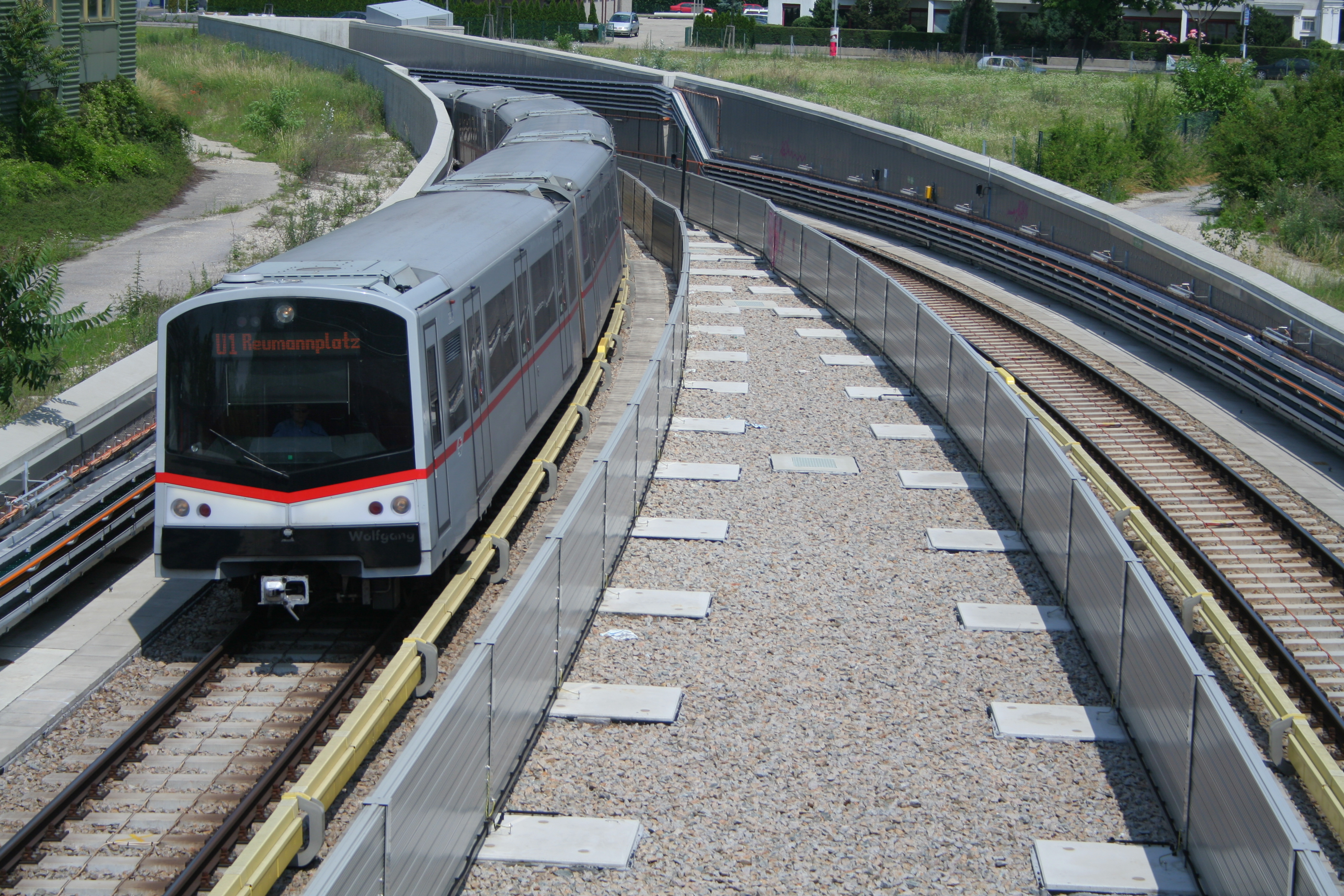
Vienna metro type V

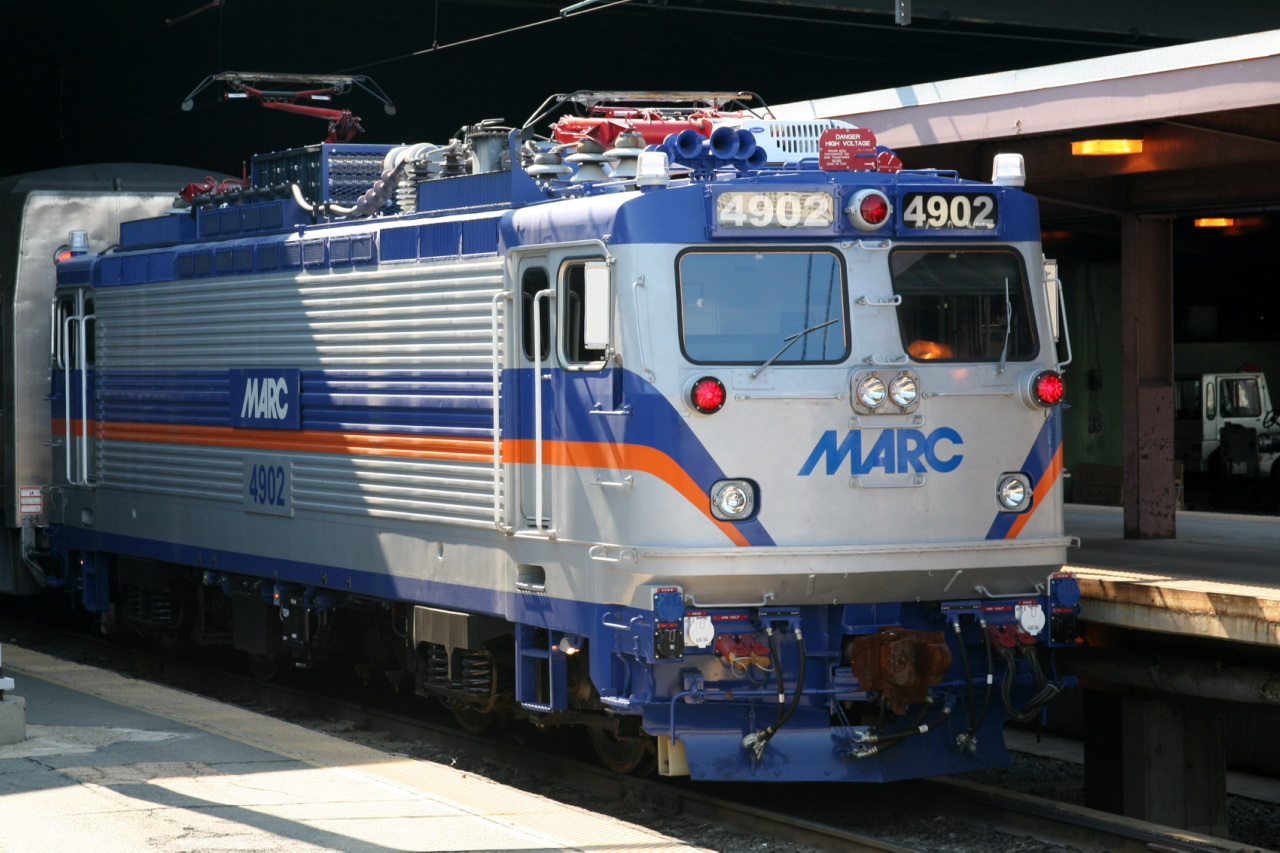
SGP-bodied MARC EMD AEM-7 in Washington, D.C.

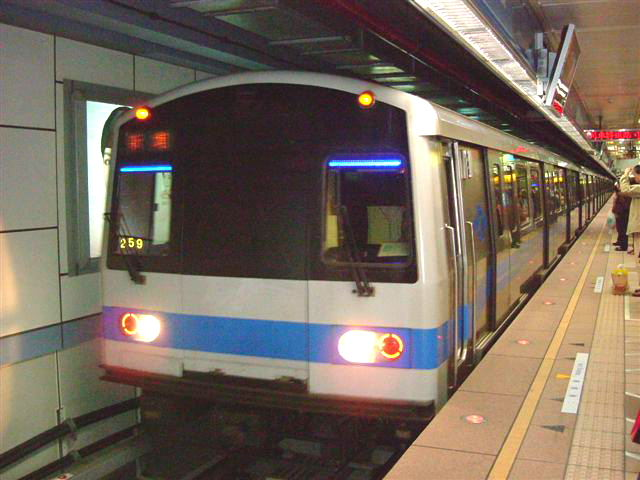
Taipei Metro C321 metro train

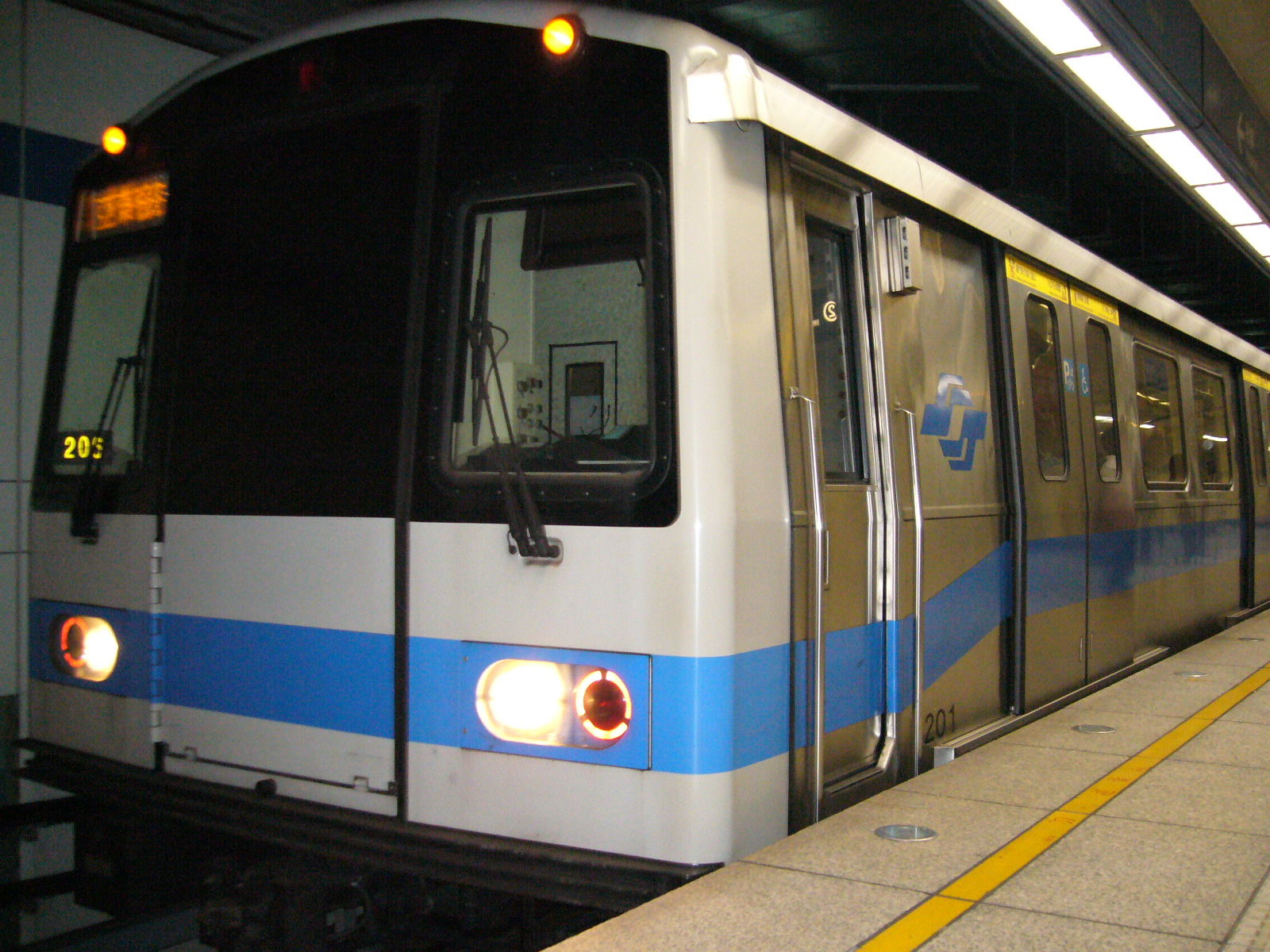
Taipei Metro C341 metro train

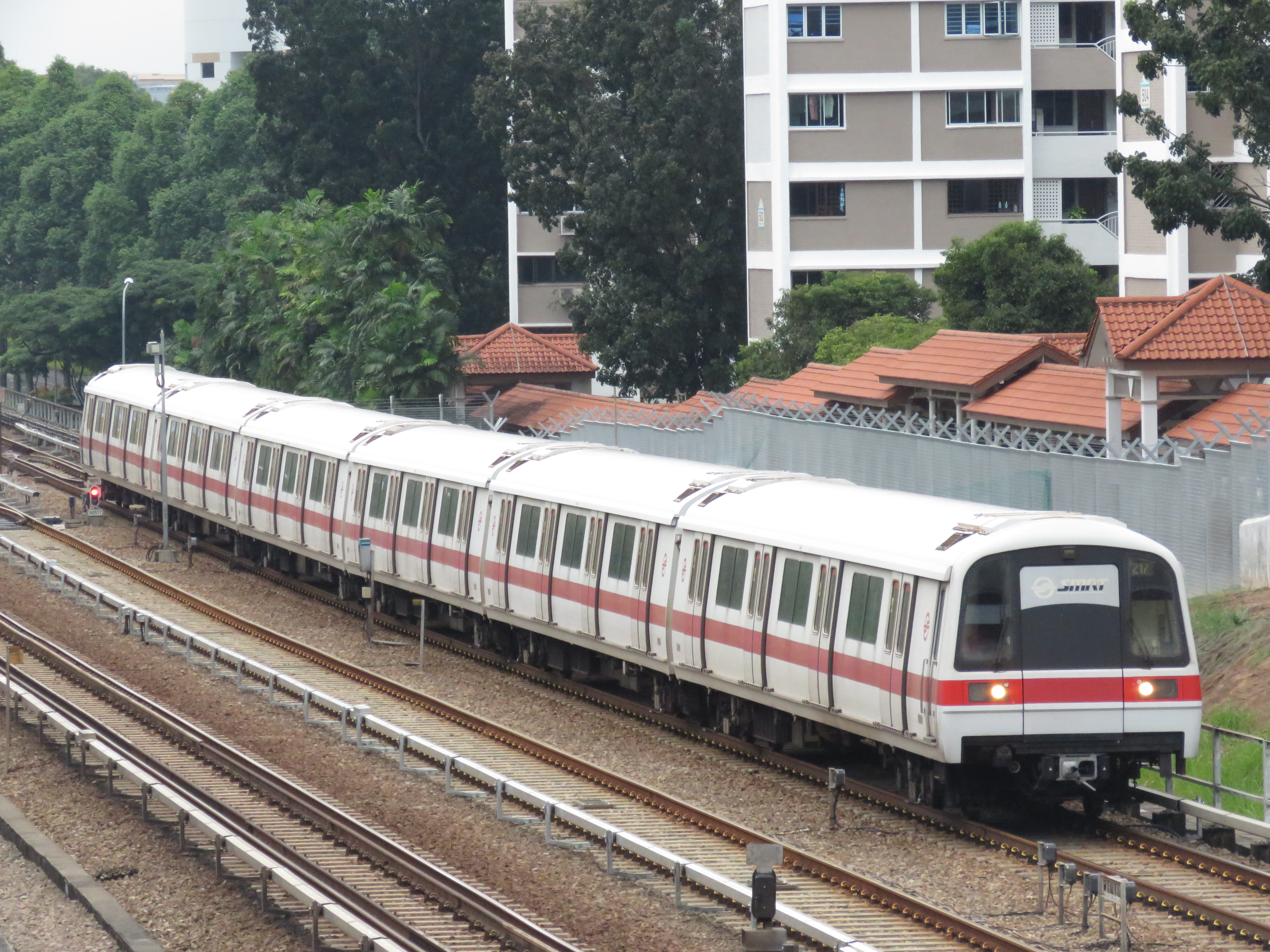
Singapore MRT C651 metro train

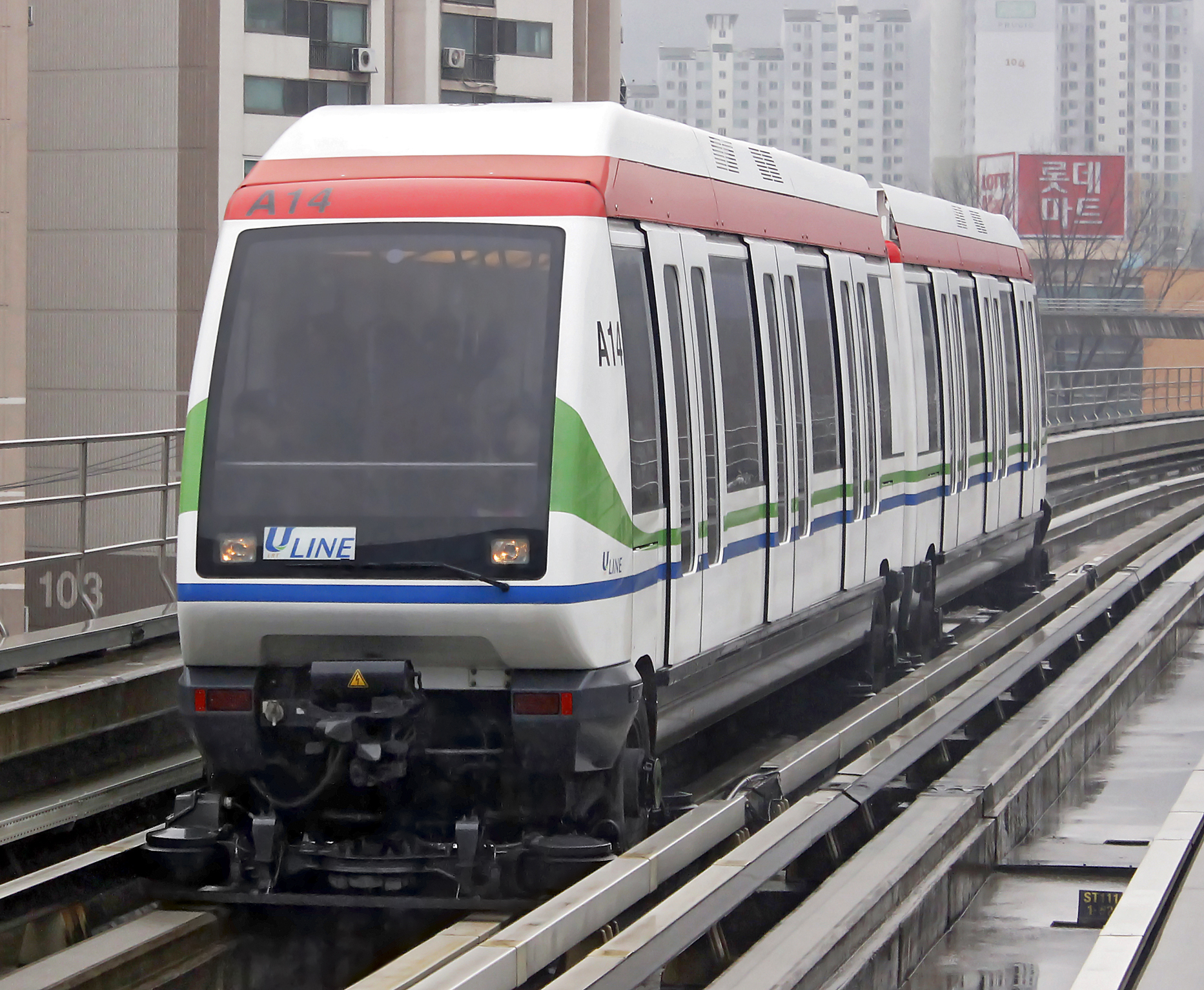
VAL 208NG for the Uijeongbu LRT (U Line)

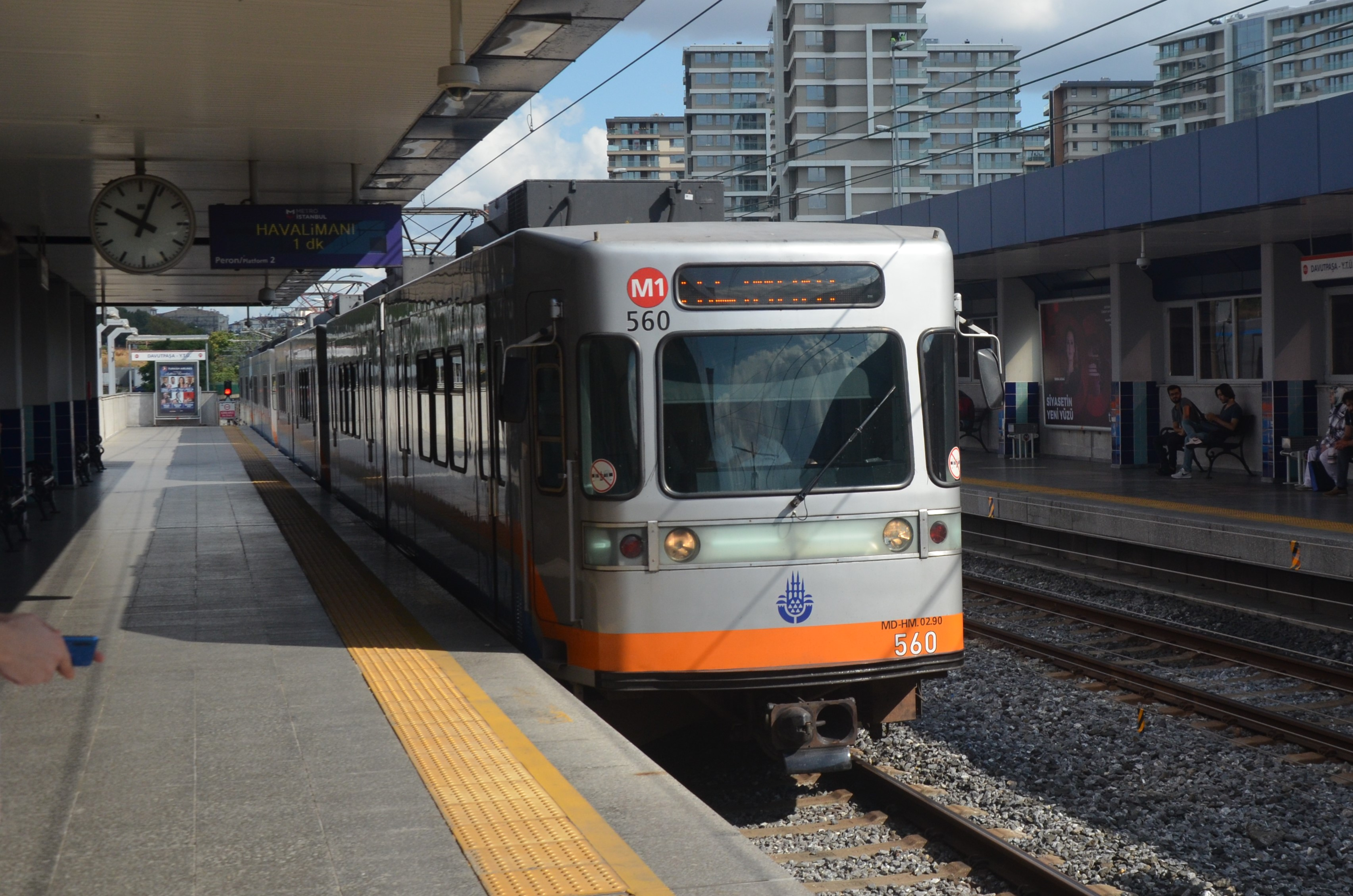
ABB-SGP LRT in Istanbul (M1 Line)

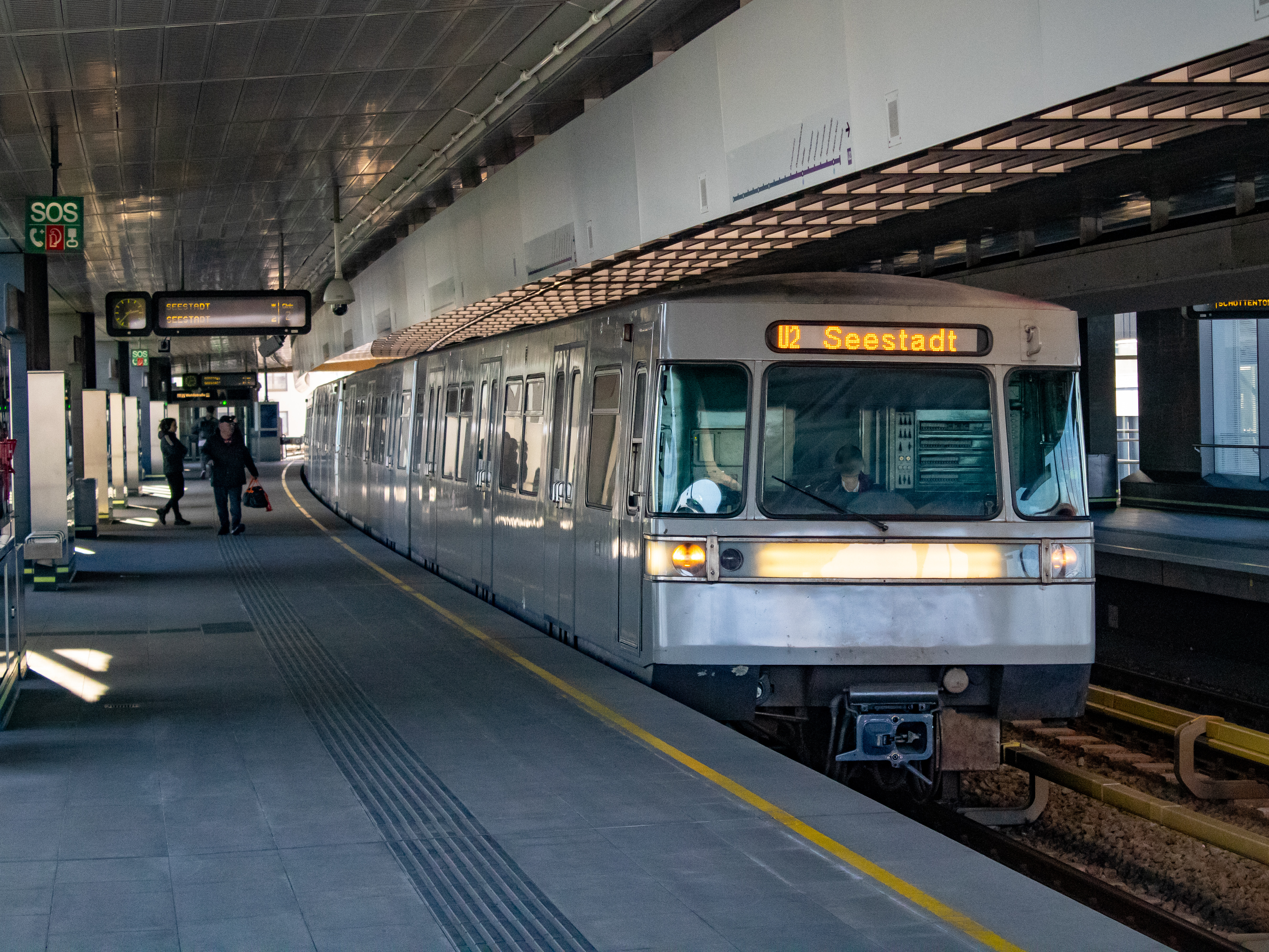
"Silberpfeil" SGP Type U2
