= Taoyuan Metro 1000 series =

Rolling stock used for Taoyuan Airport MRT

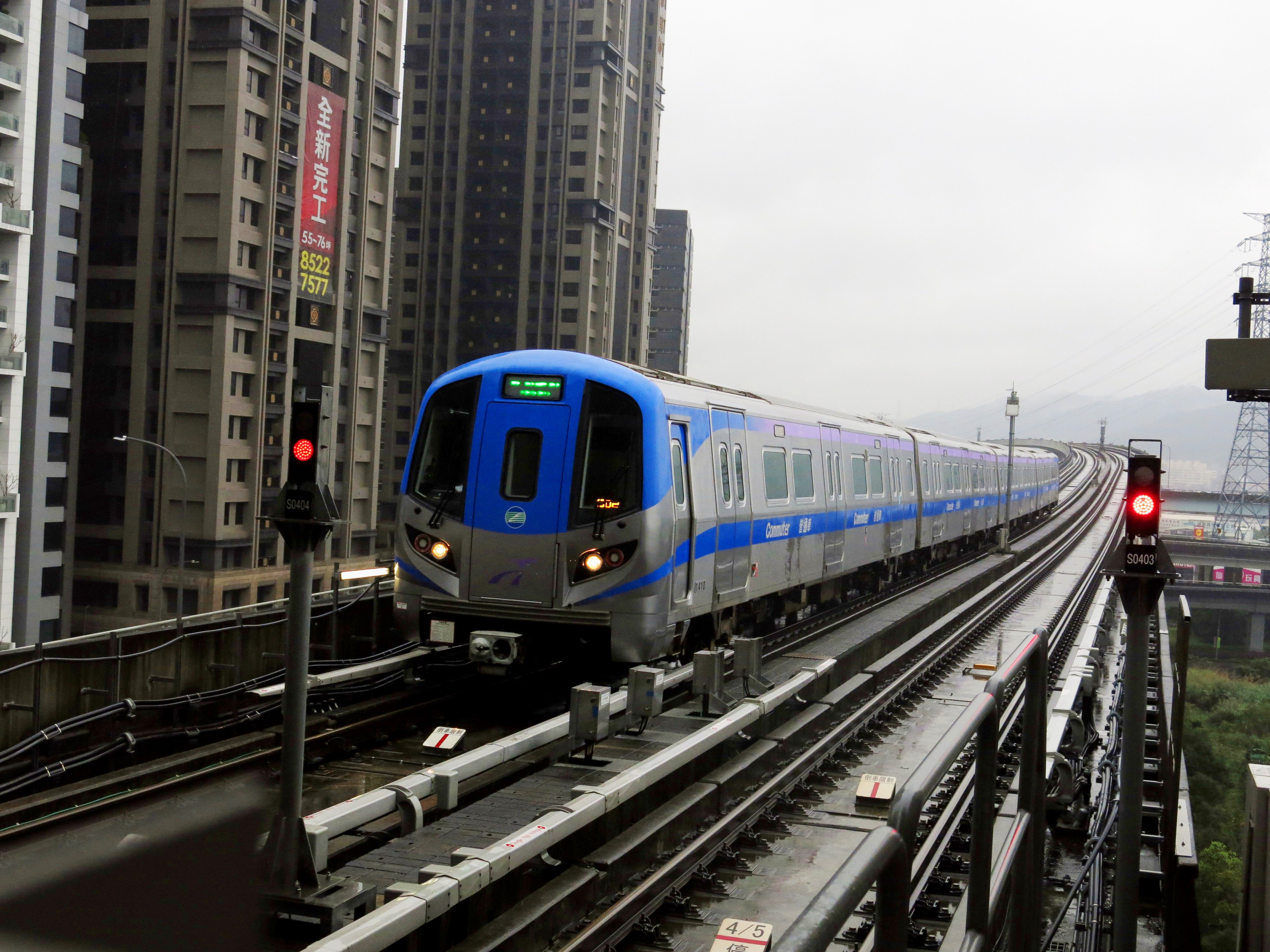
- 1010 approaching Xinzhuang Fuduxin, 25 February 2017

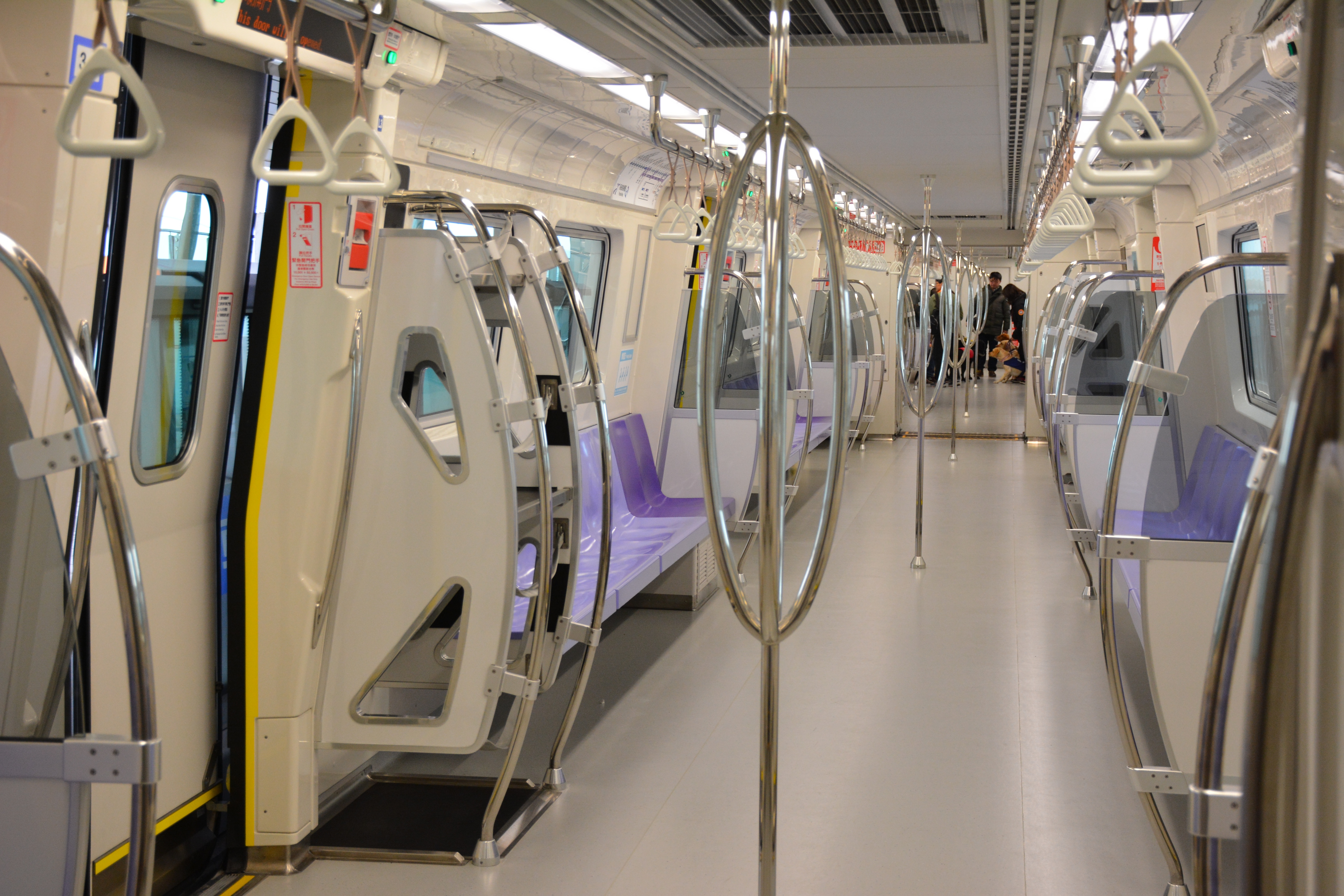
- Interior of a Taoyuan Metro 1000 series
- In service: 2017–present
- Manufacturers: Kawasaki, Taiwan Rolling Stock Company (Note: 1002–1017)
- Built at: Kobe, Hyōgo, Japan (Kawasaki) and Hsinchu, Taiwan (TRSC)
- Constructed: 2011–2012, 2015
- Entered service: 2 March 2017
- Number under construction: 12 vehicles (3 sets; sets 1021–1023)
- Number built: 80 vehicles (20 sets)
- Formation: 4-car sets DM1–M1–M2–DM2
- Fleet numbers: 1001–1023
- Capacity: 1116 passengers
- Operator: Taoyuan Metro
- Depots: Luzhu; Chingpu
- Line served: Taoyuan Airport MRT

Specifications
- Car body construction: Stainless steel
- Train length: 82.06 m (269 ft 2 11/16 in)
- Car length: End cars: 20.78 m (68 ft 2 1/8 in); Intermediate cars: 20.25 m (66 ft 5 1/4 in)
- Width: 3.03 m (9 ft 11 5/16 in)
- Height: 3,763 mm (12 ft 4 1/8 in)
- Floor height: 1,133 mm (3 ft 8 5/8 in)
- Wheel diameter: 850–775 mm (33.5–30.5 in) (new–worn)
- Wheelbase: 2,100 mm (6 ft 11 in)
- Maximum speed: 110 km/h (68 mph) (design); 100 km/h (62 mph) (service)
- Weight: 157 t (155 long tons; 173 short tons)
- Traction system: Mitsubishi Electric MAP-184-75VD139B 2-level IGBT–VVVF
- Traction motors: 16 × Mitsubishi MB-5131-A 185 kW (248 hp) asynchronous 3-phase AC
- Power output: 2.96 MW (3,969 hp)
- Transmission: Westinghouse-Natal (WN) drive; gear ratio: 6.31 : 1 (101 / 16)
- Acceleration: 1.1 m/s^{2} (3.6 ft/s^{2})
- Deceleration: 1 m/s^{2} (3.3 ft/s^{2}) (service); 1.3 m/s^{2} (4.3 ft/s^{2}) (emergency)
- Electric systems: 750 V DC third rail
- UIC classification: Bo′Bo′+Bo′Bo′+Bo′Bo′+Bo′Bo′
- Braking systems: Knorr-Bremse regenerative and electric command type brakes
- Safety systems: Siemens Trainguard MT CBTC (ATC, ATO, ATP)
- Coupling system: Scharfenberg Type 330
- Track gauge: 1,435 mm (4 ft 8 1/2 in) standard gauge

Notes/references
- Sourced from except where noted

The Taoyuan Metro 1000 series, also referred to as Commuter Trains, are the electric multiple unit train types that are used for the all-stop Commuter services on the Taoyuan Airport MRT.

== History ==
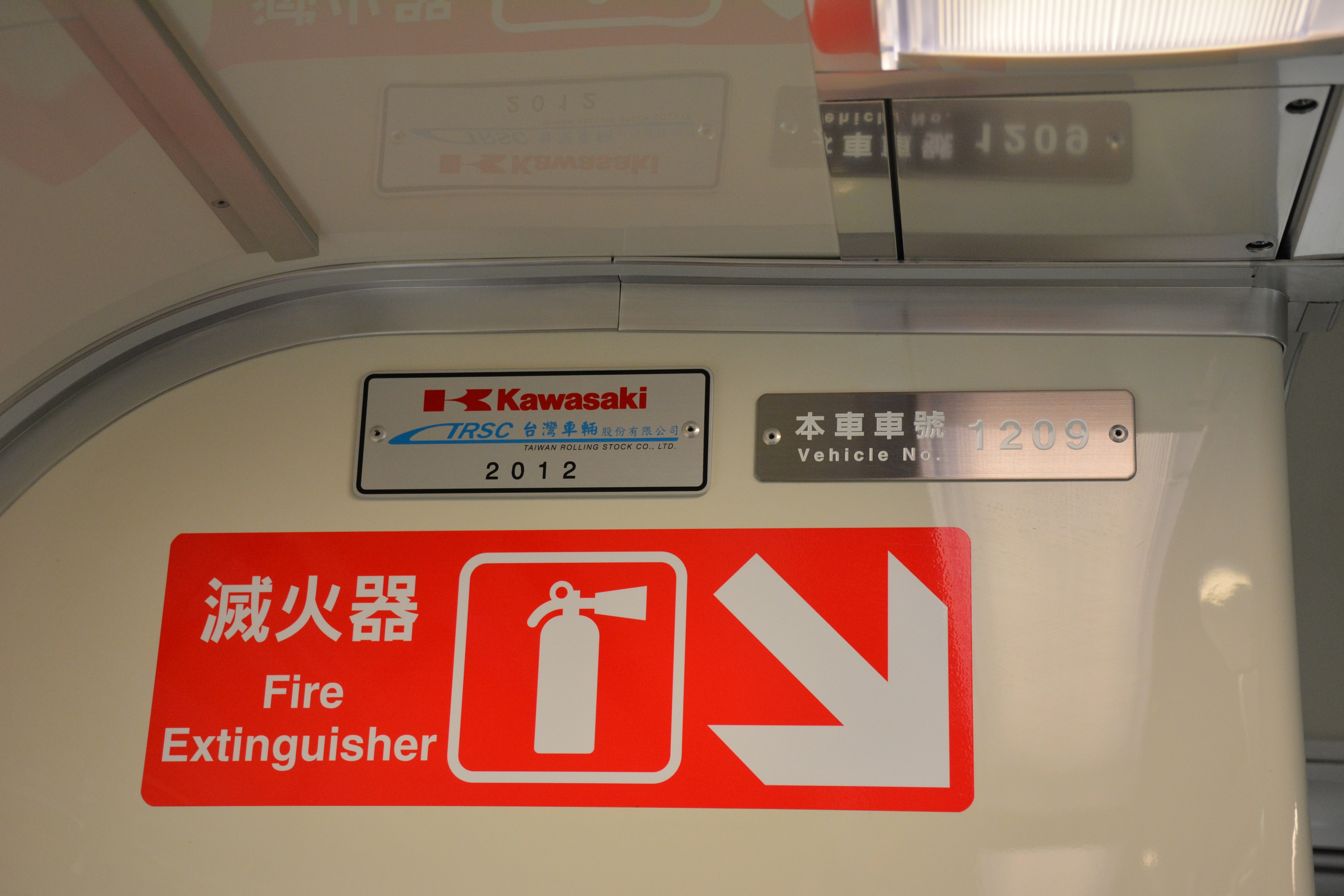
A Kawasaki-TRSC builder's plate and car fleet number on a 1000 series

In 2006, a consortium consisting of Marubeni Corporation, Kawasaki Heavy Industries and Hitachi was awarded a contract from the Bureau of High Speed Rail (BOHSR, now part of the Railway Bureau) of the Ministry of Transportation and Communications (MOTC) of Taiwan to supply the systems and build the depots for the Taoyuan Airport MRT project. Under the contract, Marubeni was in charge of overall project coordination, signalling communications and trackwork; Kawasaki responsible for rolling stock; and Hitachi for transformers. Altogether, 68 1000 series cars and 55 2000 series cars were supplied in the initial contract.

Much like the earlier Taipei Metro C371 and C381 trains concurrently supplied to Taipei Metro, the building of the trains were split between Kawasaki and the Taiwan Rolling Stock Company (TRSC); the first trainset, 1001 and a later batch of trainsets (1018 to 1020) were built by Kawasaki at its rolling stock plant in Hyōgo whereas the rest of the initial order was built domestically by TRSC. The trainset 1001 was shipped from the Port of Kobe on 29 July 2011 and arrived at the Port of Taipei on 3 August 2011 whereas TRSC completed assembly of sets 1002 to 1017 in December 2012. Trainset 1018 arrived at the Port of Taipei 3 September 2015. The trains commenced revenue operation with the official opening of the Taoyuan Airport MRT line in March 2017.

In July 2018, Express services were extended to Huanbei and set 1019 was reallocated to serve Express services but otherwise had no significant changes apart from a livery change.

== Overview ==
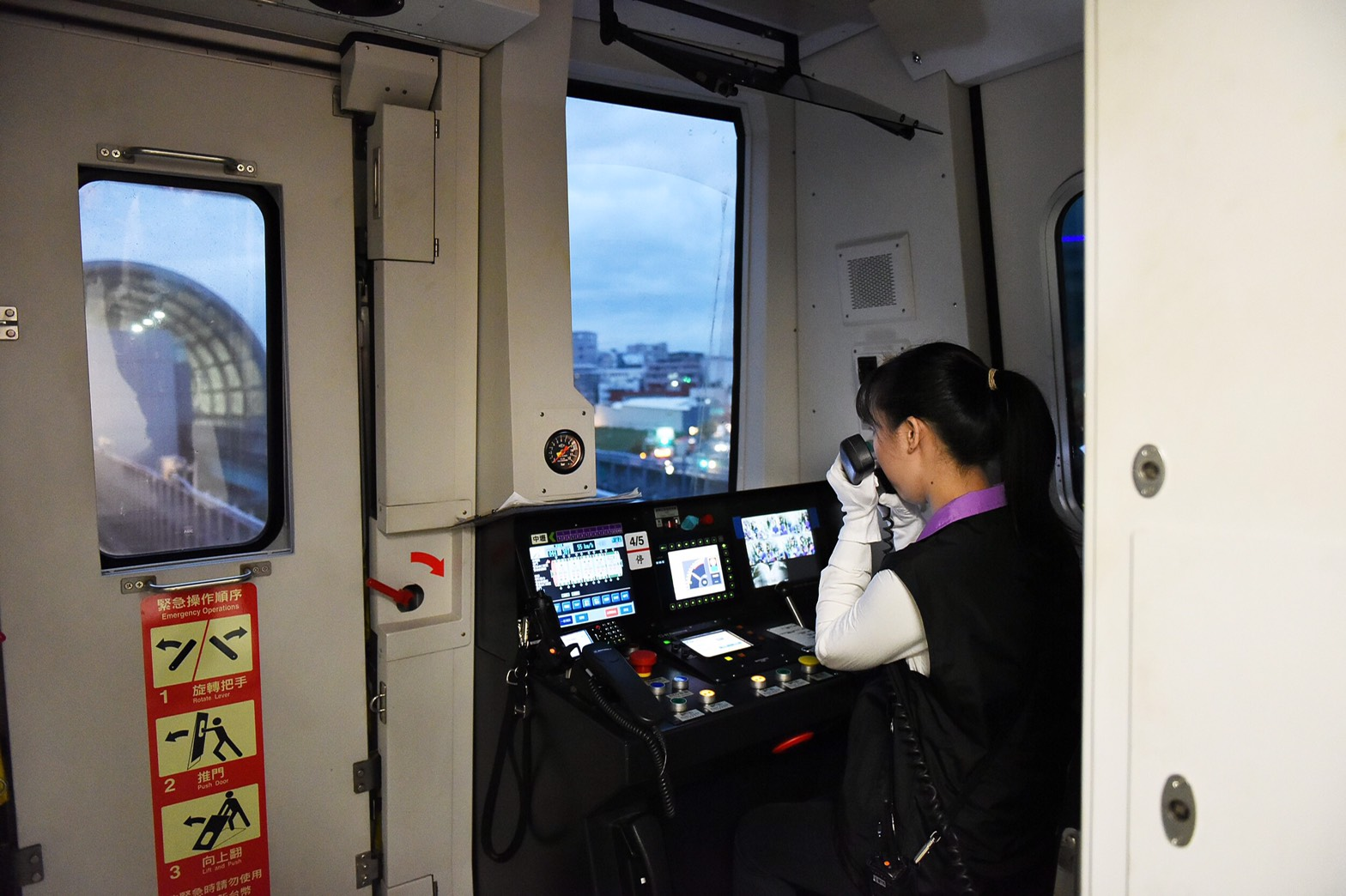
The driver's cab and the detrainment ramp of the 1000 series

Exterior-wise, the 1000 series features an aerodynamic front made of a fiber-reinforced plastic (FRP) bonnet with an emergency detrainment door that be folded outwards as a ramp not unlike their Taipei and Kaohsiung counterparts. The carbody is made of stainless steel and is designed with crashworthiness in mind whereas the car-end underframe of low-alloy high-tensile steel. Unlike earlier MRT trains used in Taiwan, these trains use plug doors to reduce noise with the doors configured to be three dual-leaf doors per side per car. The 1000 series are also fitted with exterior LCDs to denote the nature of the train service and the stations served.

In order to handle the continuous 4.92% gradient on the line, all bogies are motorised.

The interior of the 1000 series features longitudinal seats made of FRP and LEDs above train doors much like their Taipei counterparts and has a handrail and grab handle configuration identical to the Taipei Metro C381. Vertical stanchion poles are branched into four. Special interior features included to accommodate airport passengers include dedicated luggage racks and LCDs capable of displaying train route information and flight information. In addition, automated external defibrillators (AED) are also provided on board the trains.

== Fleet numbering ==
The configuration of a four-car 1000 series trainset in revenue service is DM1–M1–M2–DM2 with the DM1 car facing Taoyuan Airport and Huanbei and the DM2 car facing Taipei Main Station.

Each car is assigned its own four-digit serial number:

- The first digit denotes the train type, in this case the 1000 series.
- The second digit denotes the car position, with DM1 being 4, M1 being 3, M2 being 2 and DM2 being 1.
- The other two digits are the identification number of the train the car is part of. A full-length train of four cars consists of one identification number. For example, a train of four cars would have serial numbers 1401, 1301, 1201 and 1101, respectively.

== Gallery ==
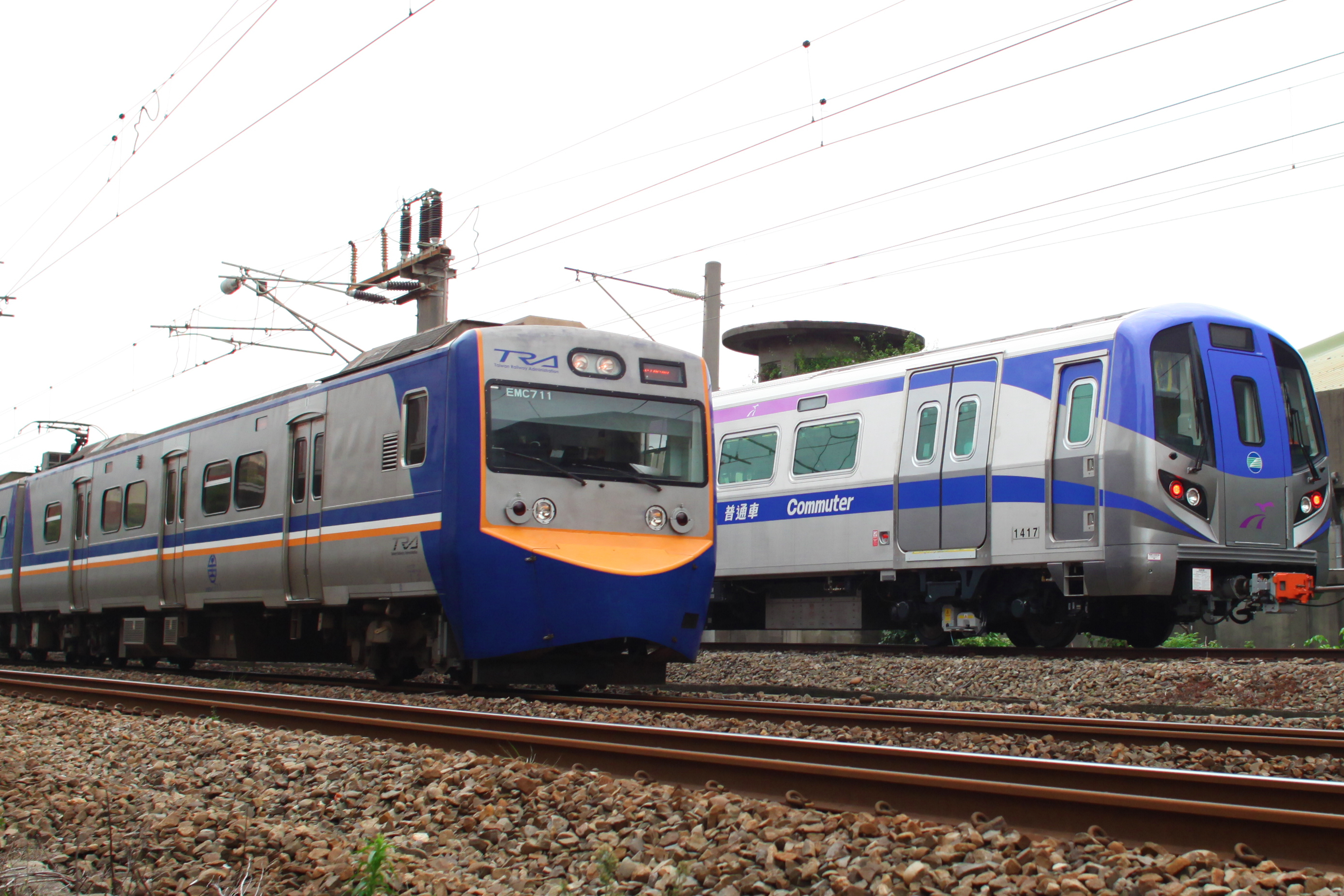
A Taiwan Railways Administration EMU700 commuter train (left) and a Taoyuan Metro 1000 series at the TRSC plant at Hsinchu, Taiwan, November 2012

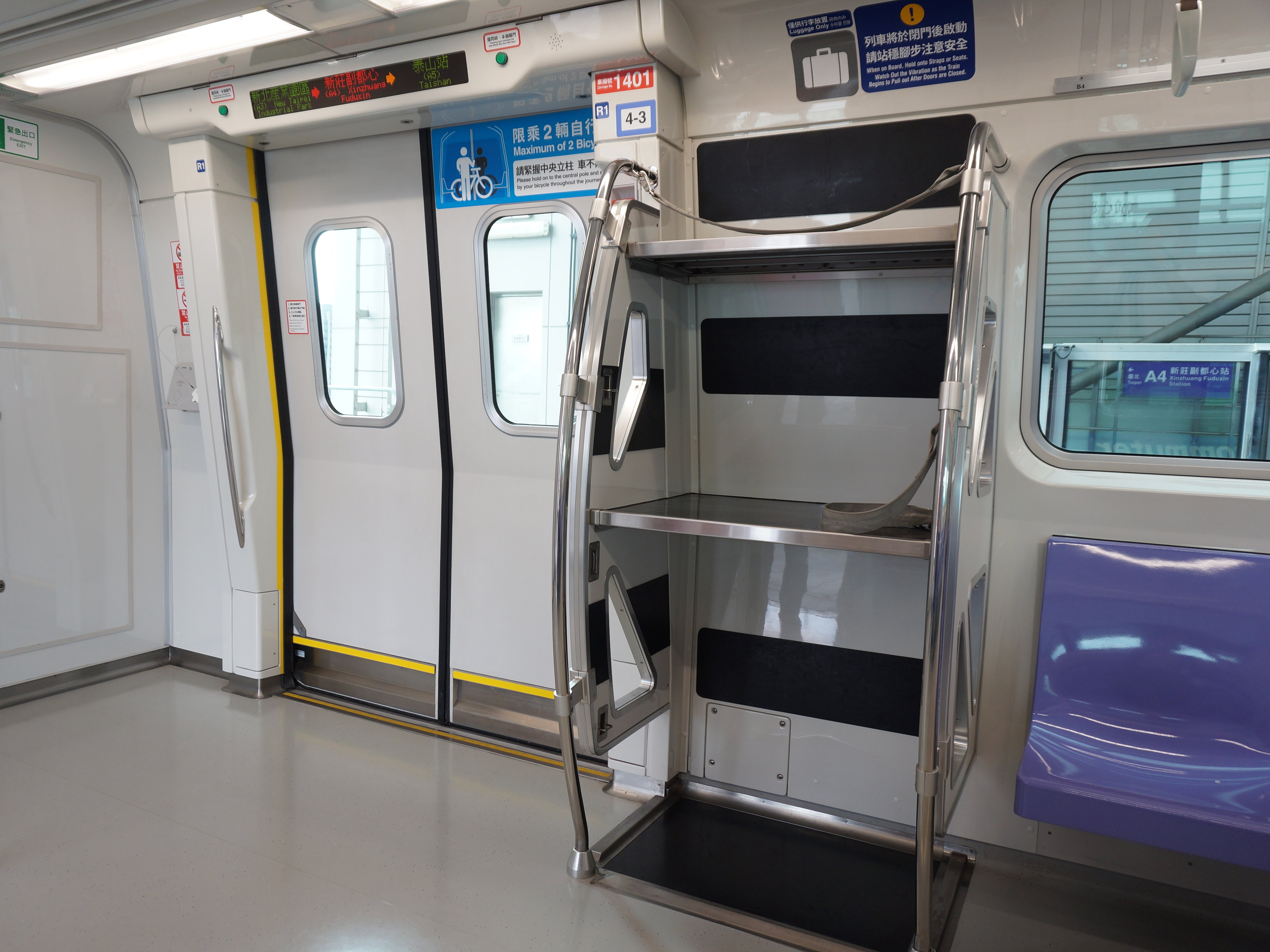
The luggage rack and train door of the 1000 series

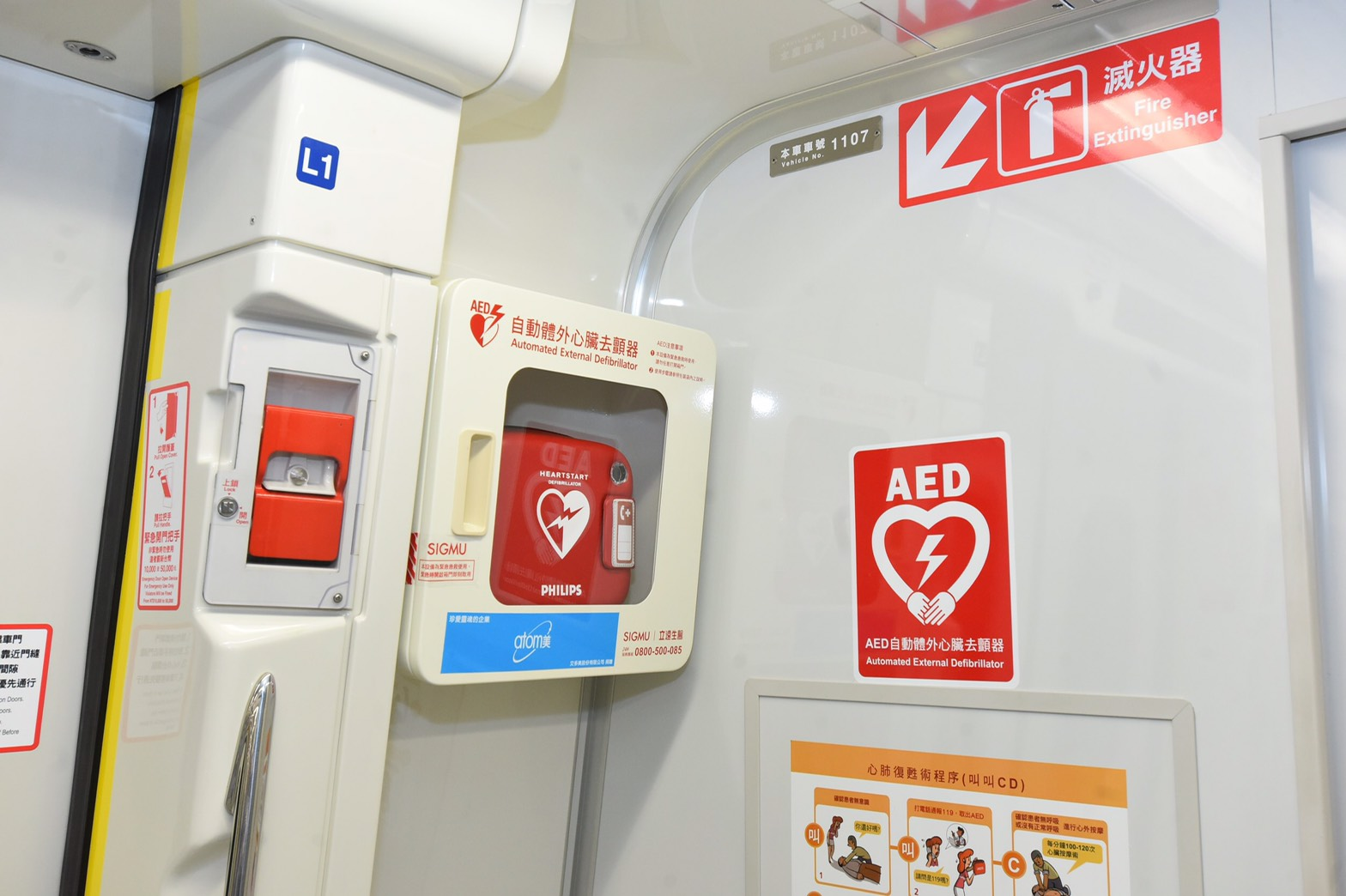
An onboard AED device

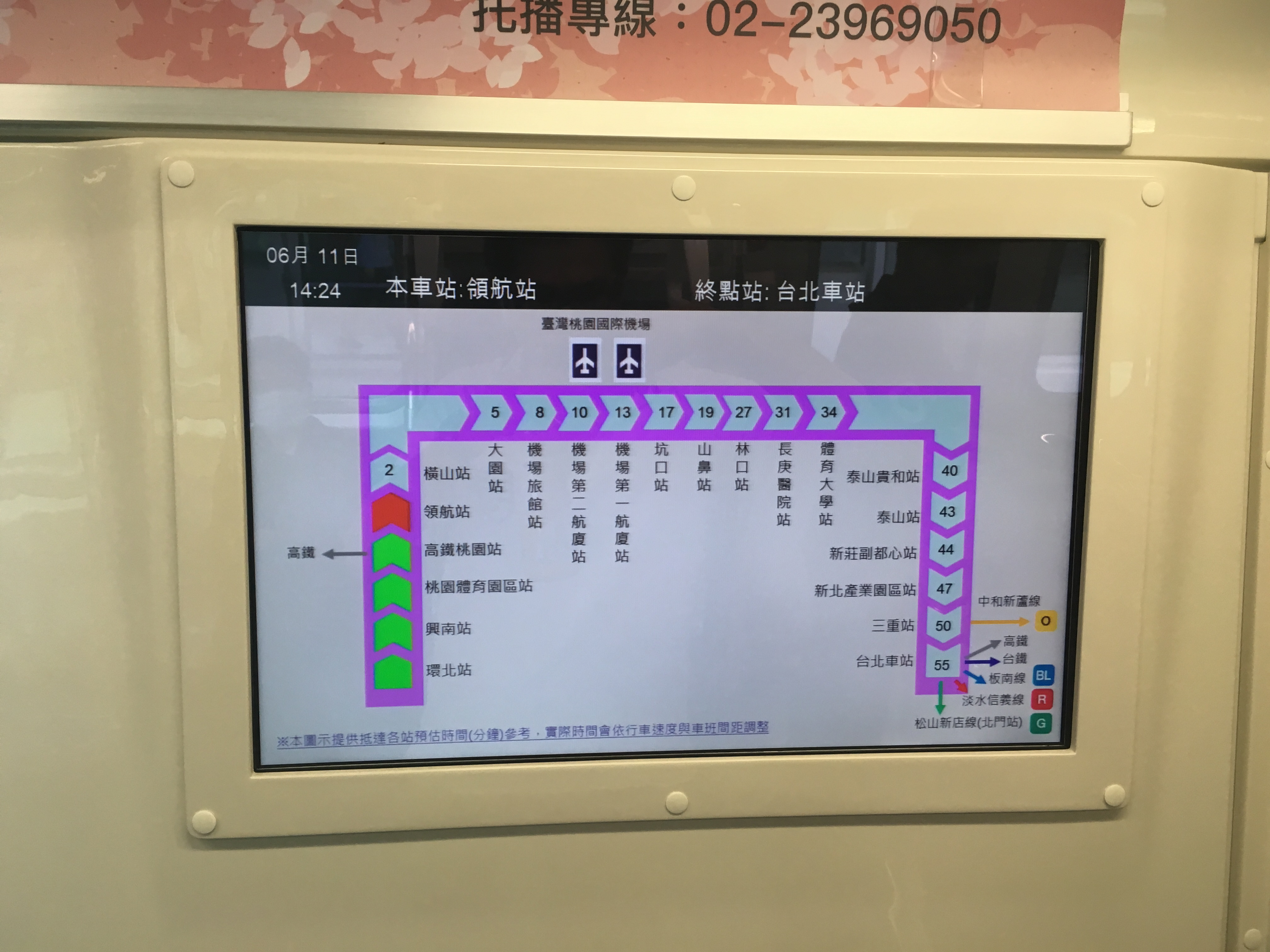
The interior LCD of the 1000 series

== See also ==
- Taoyuan Metro 2000 series - The express counterpart of the 1000 series
