= Scharfenberg coupler =

Automatic railway coupling

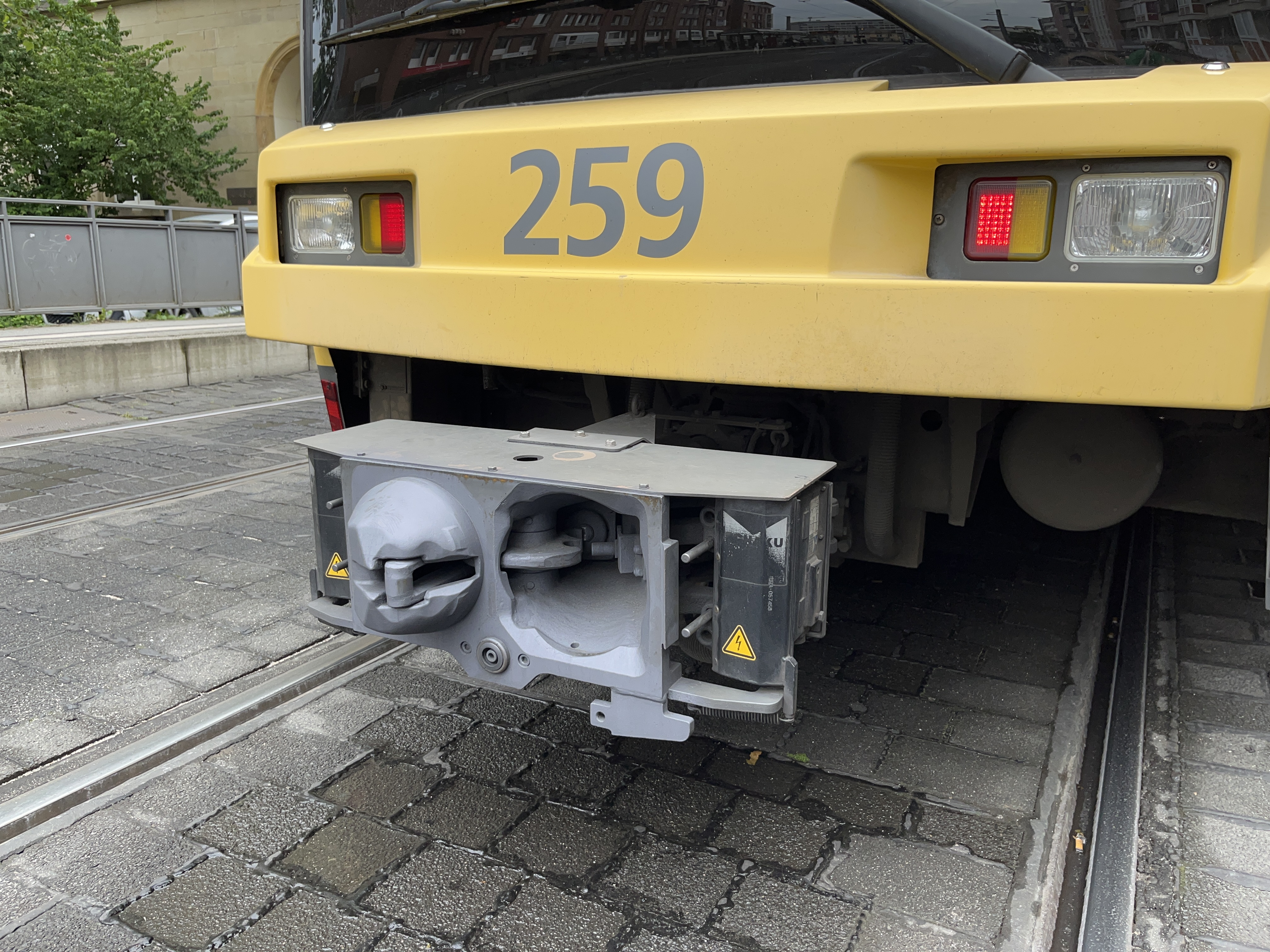
Scharfenberg coupler on a DUEWAG GT6-70D/N low floor tram. Note the partially worn off Schaku logo on the right.

The Scharfenberg coupler (German: Scharfenbergkupplung, abbreviated Schaku) is a commonly used type of fully automatic railway coupling.

Designed in 1903 by Karl Scharfenberg in Königsberg, Germany (today Kaliningrad, Russia), the coupler has gradually spread from transit trains to regular passenger service trains, although outside Europe its use is generally restricted to mass transit systems. The Schaku is superior in many ways to the AAR (Janney/knuckle) coupler because it also automates electrical and pneumatic connections and disconnections. However, there is no standard for the placement of these electro-pneumatic connections. Some rail operators have placed them on the sides while others have placed them either below or above the mechanical portion of the coupler.

== Scharfenberg as a technical design principle and brand name ==
Scharfenberg and the abbreviation Schaku are registered trademarks of Voith Patent GmbH. For this reason, only couplings from Voith can use this name. The associated coupling principle is also referred to as latch type design. It is not protected by a patent and is used with fully compatible couplers from manufacturers such as Dellner or Wabtec.

== Working principles ==
The face of the Scharfenberg coupler has a protruding cone and a matching cup. Inside the cone there is a rigid metal hoop connected to a revolving, spring-loaded metal disk with a notch on the opposite side. When ready to couple, the spring turns the disk so the hoop is extended from the cone. As the cars meet, the hoop enters the cup on the other coupler, stopping against the disk. The hoops are then pressed back into their own coupler, causing the disks to rotate until the notches align with the hoops. After the hoops have entered, the notches on the disks spring back into the hoop extended position, locking the coupling. In the coupled position, forces on the hoops and disk will balance out, which means that the Scharfenberg, unlike many other couplers, is not dependent on heavy latches to stay locked.

Small air cylinders, acting on the rotating heads of the coupler, ensure the engagement of the components, making it unnecessary to use force to get a good coupling. Joining portions of a passenger train can be done at very low speed (less than 3 km/h or 2 mph in the final approach), so that the passengers are not jolted. One problem with the coupler is that it is often hard to connect it in a curve. Planned coupling is normally done on a straight flat track, while there has been trouble coupling a broken down train at an unplanned place.

Scharfenberg couplers

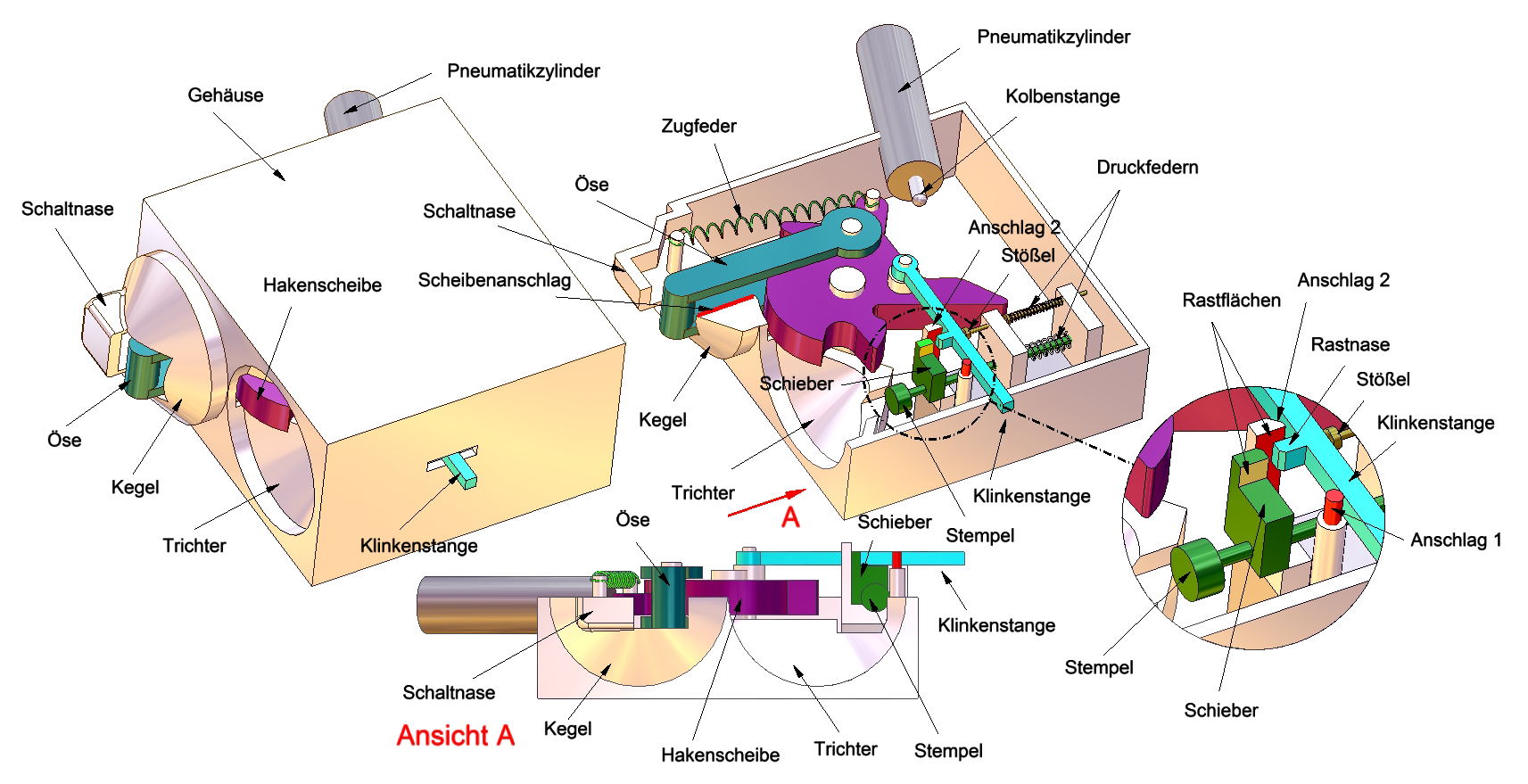
Layout of a Scharfenberg coupler (Labels in German)

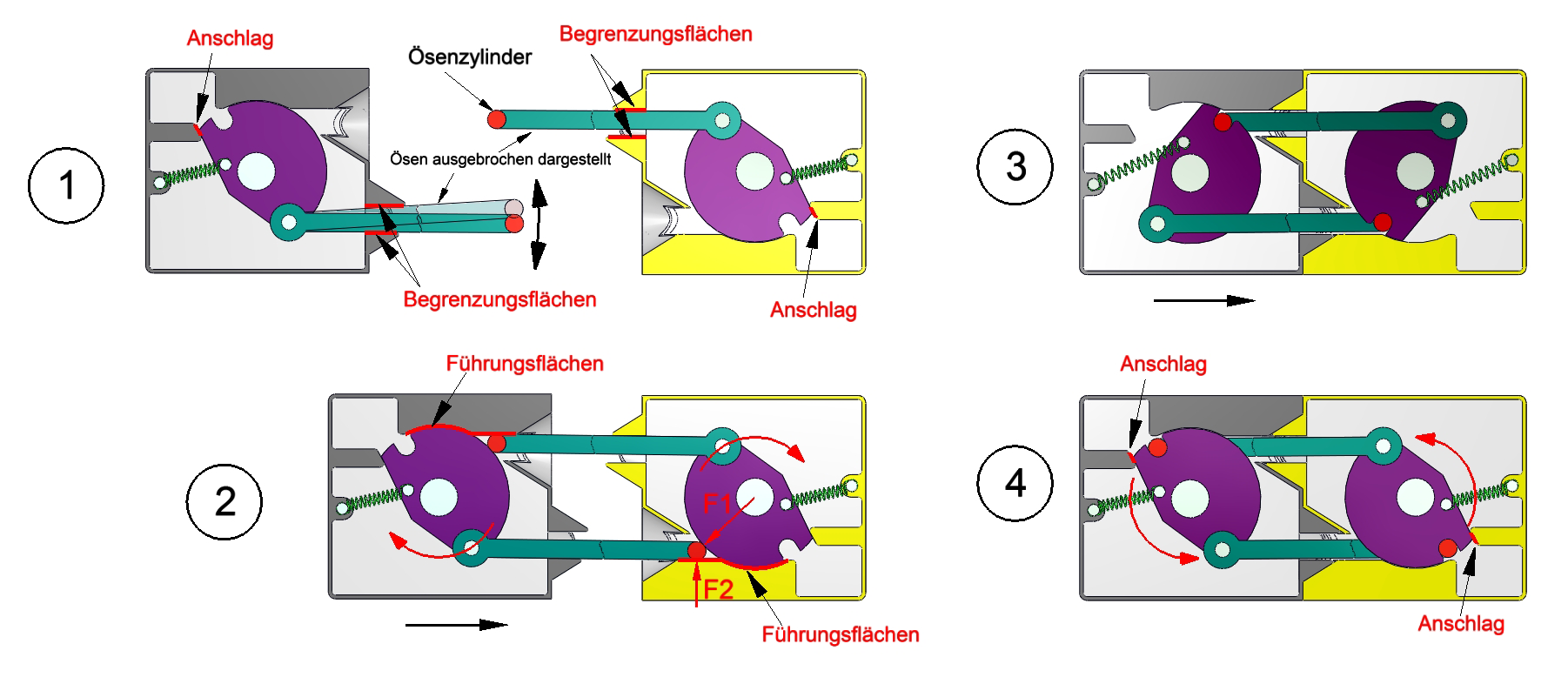
Coupling process of a Scharfenberg coupler (Labels in German)

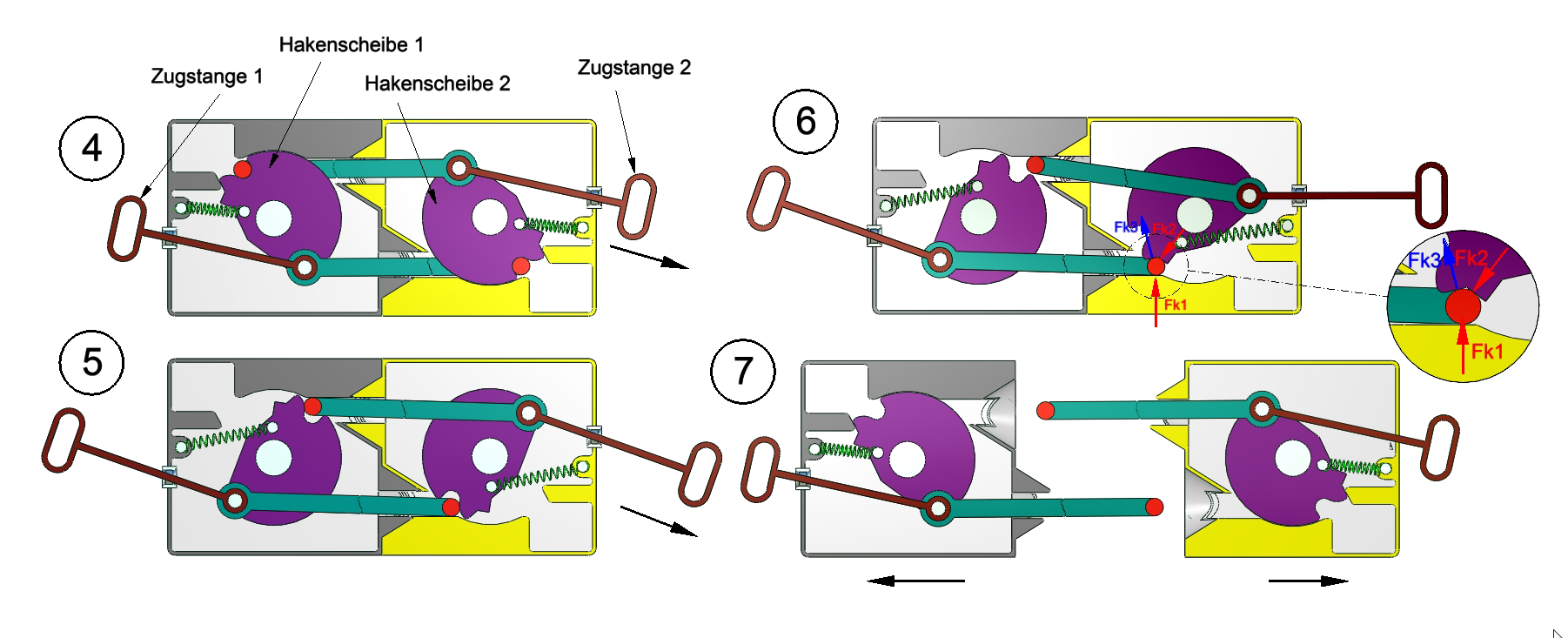
Uncoupling process of a Scharfenberg coupler (Labels in German)

== Uses ==
Scharfenberg couplers on Swedish SL X60 EMU

Rail equipment manufacturers such as Alstom offer the Schaku as an option on their mass transit passenger cars and locomotives. Presently, Scharfenberg couplers are in use on the following passenger transit systems:

=== Australia ===
- Victoria - V/Line (VLocity 160, Sprinter), Metro Trains Melbourne (Comeng, Siemens Nexas, X'Trapolis 100 [also used in Chile])
- New South Wales - Sydney Trains (T, M, A & B sets), NSW TrainLink (Endeavour railcar and Xplorer)
- Western Australia - Transperth (A-series, B-series train)
- South Australia - Adelaide Metro (3000 class railcar)
- Queensland - Queensland Rail (EMU, ICE, SMU, IMU, NGR)

=== Brazil ===
- São Paulo - Companhia Paulista de Trens Metropolitanos (All vehicles, except 1700 and 5400 series)
- São Paulo - Companhia do Metropolitano de São Paulo (Type F, M and P vehicles)
- Salvador - CCR Metrô Bahia

=== Canada ===
- Montreal - Metro
- Montreal - REM
- Vancouver - SkyTrain
- Toronto - Scarborough RT

=== Europe ===
- Thalys
- TGV – All French high-speed trains are equipped with Scharfenberg type 10 couplers.
- ICE – All German high-speed trains are equipped with Scharfenberg type 10 couplers.
- Many regional train EMUs and DMUs in Europe
- Rhine-Ruhr Stadtbahn - Almost all German light-rail and streetcar systems use Scharfenberg couplers.
- SBB Cargo – In 2019, the Swiss freight operator introduced cargo wagons with Voith CargoFlex, an extension of Scharfenberg type 10 couplers.
- Channel Tunnel - Eurotunnel Le Shuttle
- Narrow-gauge railways in Saxony, Germany

==== Spain ====
- Renfe commuter, regional and high speed trainsets and multiple units
- Talgo III trainsets (now retired)
- Euskotren EMUs
- FGV trainsets
- Madrid, Barcelona and Bilbao metros (some are used only if a train needs to be towed)
- CAF Urbos trams (towing only, some adapted with electric connections)
- Iryo and Ouigo high speed trainsets
- Renfe metre-gauge electric and diesel multiple units

==== United Kingdom ====
- Class 175 Alstom "Coradia"
- Class 180 Alstom "Adelante", used on Grand Central
- Class 185 Siemens "Desiro", operated by TransPennine Express.
- Class 332
- Class 333
- Class 458 Alstom "Coradia Jun"
- Hitachi A-train
- Bombardier M5000
- London Underground 2009 Stock
- Glasgow Subway 3rd Generation Rolling Stock

=== Indonesia ===
- Soekarno–Hatta Airport Skytrain
- Whoosh
- Jabodebek LRT

=== New Zealand ===
- Auckland - AM class
- Wellington - FP/FT class

=== Philippines ===
- Metro Manila MRT Line 3 Class 3000 and Class 3100

=== Saudi Arabia ===
- Haramain High Speed Train - Talgo 350 train

=== Singapore ===
- Mass Rapid Transit

=== Taiwan ===
- Taipei - Taipei Metro (Matra VAL 256 and Bombardier Innovia APM 256)
- New Taipei City - New Taipei Metro (Hitachi Rail Italy Driverless Metro (4-car and 2-car))
- Taoyuan - Taoyuan Airport MRT (Commuter and Express)
- Taichung - Taichung MRT (Kawasaki/TRSC EMU)
- Kaohsiung - Kaohsiung Metro (Siemens Modular Metro)

=== Thailand ===
- Bangkok - BTS Skytrain, MRT, Airport Rail Link and SRT Red Lines

=== United States ===
- Austin - CapMetro Redline (Stadler GTW)
- Baltimore - Baltimore Light RailLink (New light rail vehicles)
- Buffalo - Buffalo Metro Rail
- California - Caltrans Division of Rail (Stadler FLIRT H2 State Owned Fleet)
- Denver - RTD Bus & Rail (New light rail vehicles)
- Dallas - DART Silverline (Stadler FLIRT DMU)
- Denton County - DCTA A-Train (Stadler GTW DMU)
- Fort Worth - Trinity Metro TEXRail (Stadler FLIRT DMU)
- Minneapolis - METRO (Light rail vehicles)
- New Jersey - New Jersey Transit (New light rail vehicles & Stadler GTW DMU)
- Norfolk, Virginia - HRT (Light rail vehicles)
- Northeast Corridor - Amtrak (Avelia Liberty)
- Portland, Oregon - Trimet (Light rail vehicles)
- San Bernardino - Metrolink Arrow Service (Stadler FLIRT DMU & FLIRT H2)
- San Francisco Bay Area - BART (New Type D and E vehicles and Stadler FLIRT GTW)
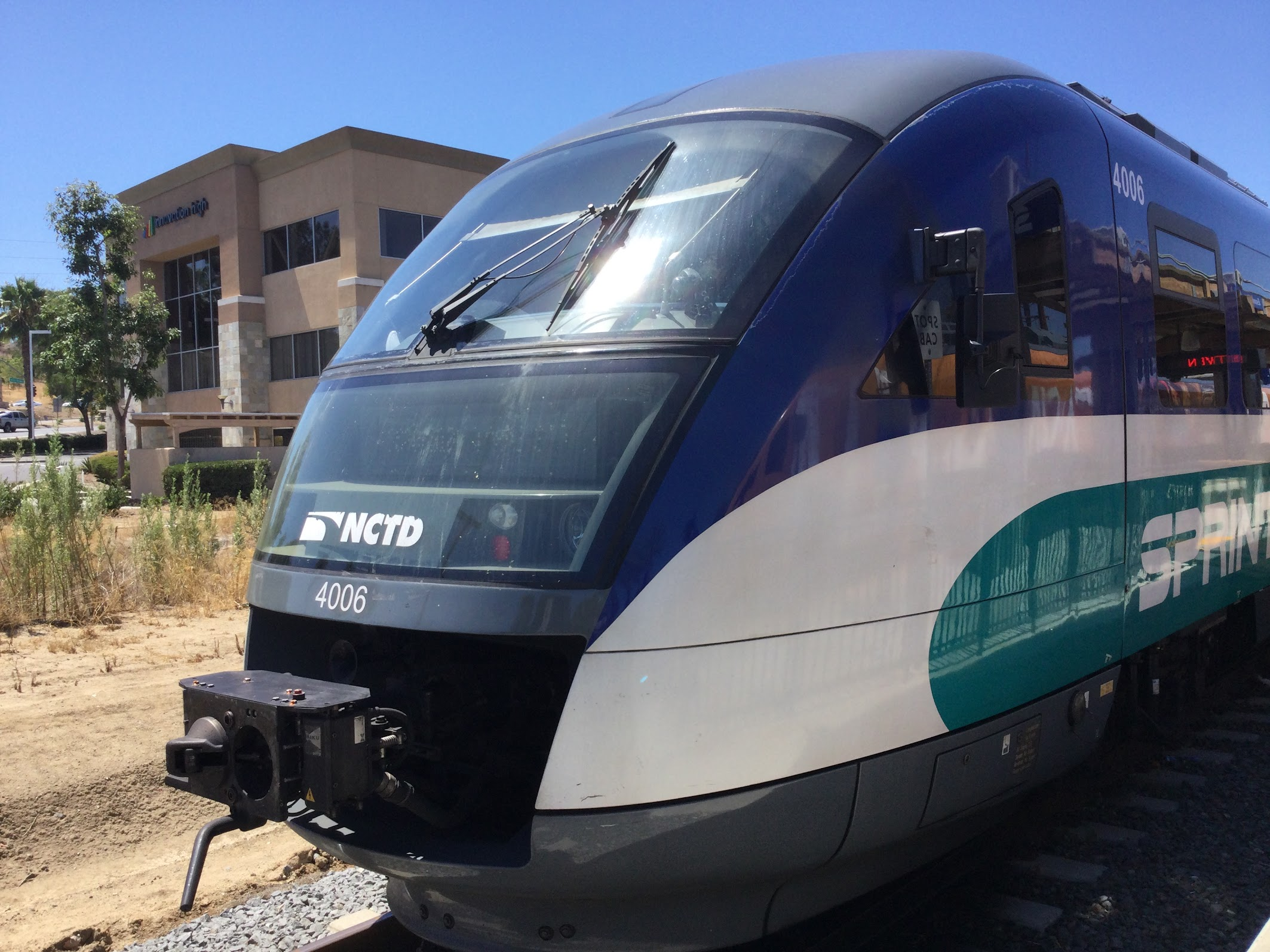
- Scharfenberg coupler on a NCTD Sprinter Siemens Desiro VT642 DMU at Escondido Transit Center
  San Francisco Bay Area - Muni Metro (New Type 4 vehicles)
- San Francisco Bay Area - Caltrain (Stadler KISS)
- San Diego County, California (NCTD Sprinter hybrid rail)
- Seattle - Sound Transit Link (Light Rail Vehicles)

== Types ==
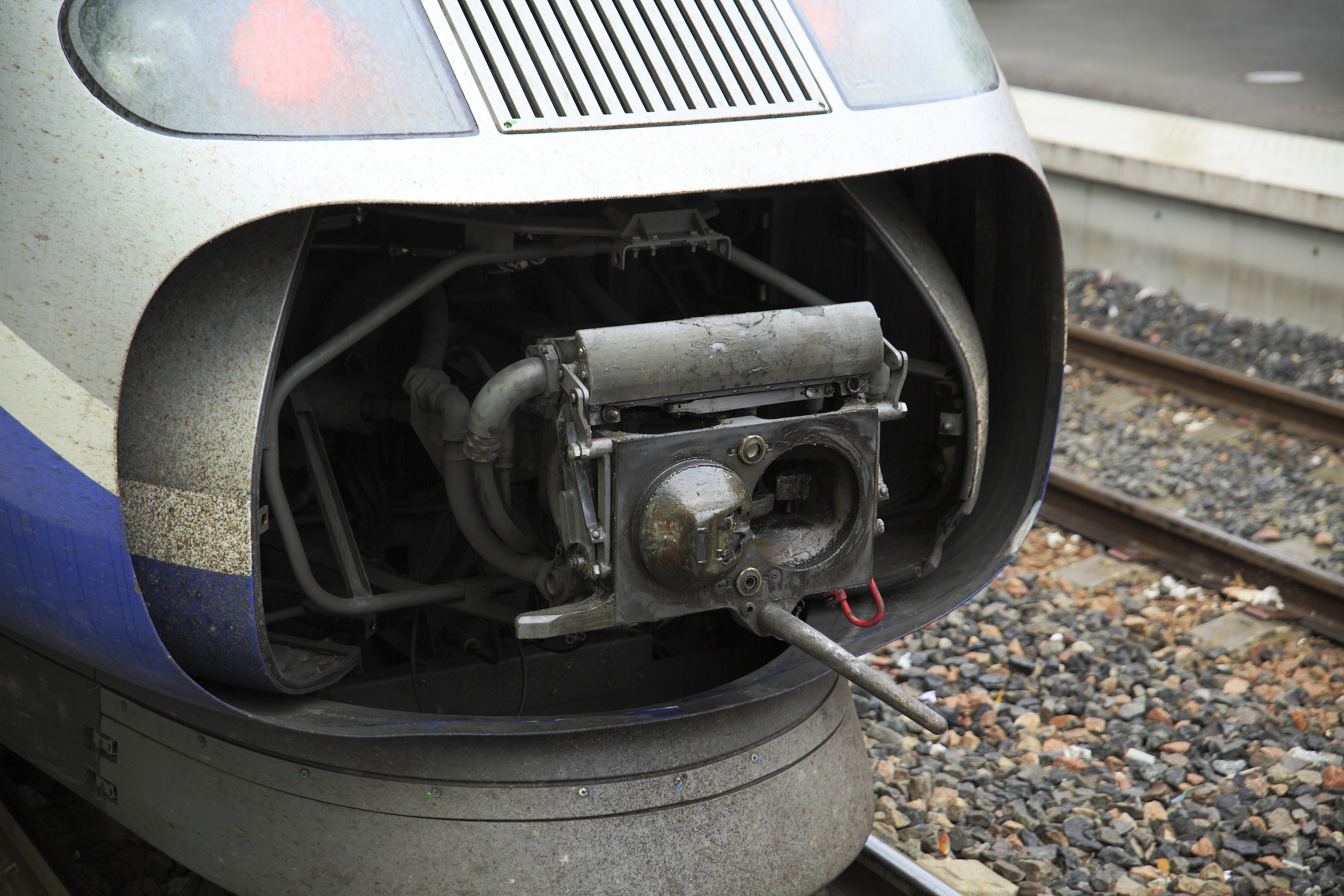
Type 10 as used on TGV

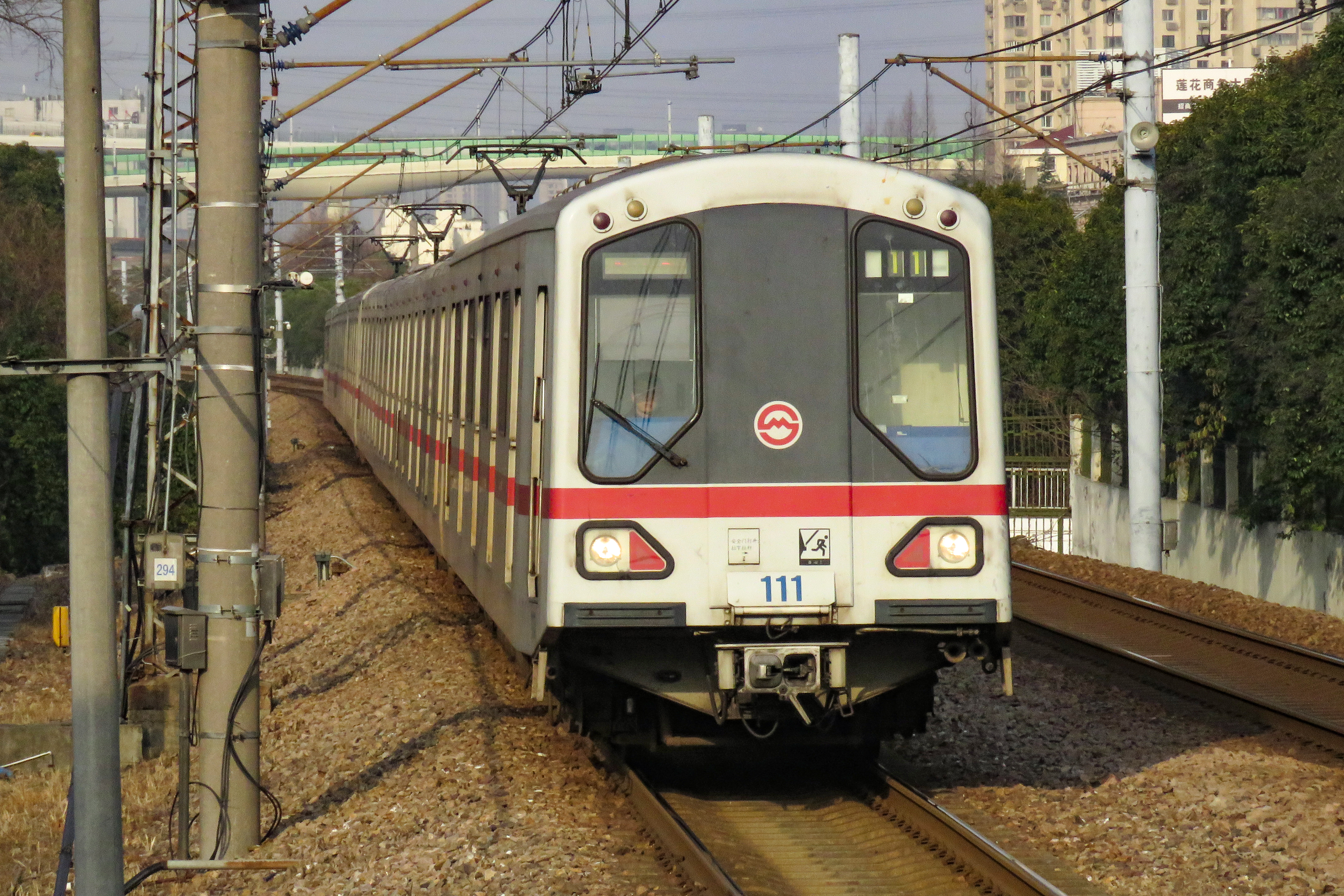
The Shanghai Metro is among several metro systems that use the Type 35 Scharfenberg coupler

Coupler heads for passenger trains that work according to the Scharfenberg principles:

- Type 10: Used for mainline railways and high speed rail applications
- Type 12: For regional, intercity and high-speed trains, as well as underground railways
- Type 35: Designed for rolling stock without a compressed air system and used for urban transit applications
- Type 330: Used for trams and light rail transit
- Type 430/530: A folding coupler designed for low-floor trams and monorails
- Type 55: Designed for shunting purposes
- Type 140: Designed for industrial railways
- CargoFlex: For freight trains, based on the type 10 Scharfenberg coupler head

Couplers for freight trains based on the Scharfenberg principles:

- Digital automatic coupler for freight trains, based on the Scharfenberg coupler head Type 10.
- Hybrid digital automatic coupler for locomotives, based on the Scharfenberg coupler head type 10. The coupler can be used with both automatic and screw couplings.

== See also ==
- Janney coupler
- Draft gear
- Railway coupling by country
