= Taoyuan Metro 2000 series =

Rolling stock used for Taoyuan Airport MRT

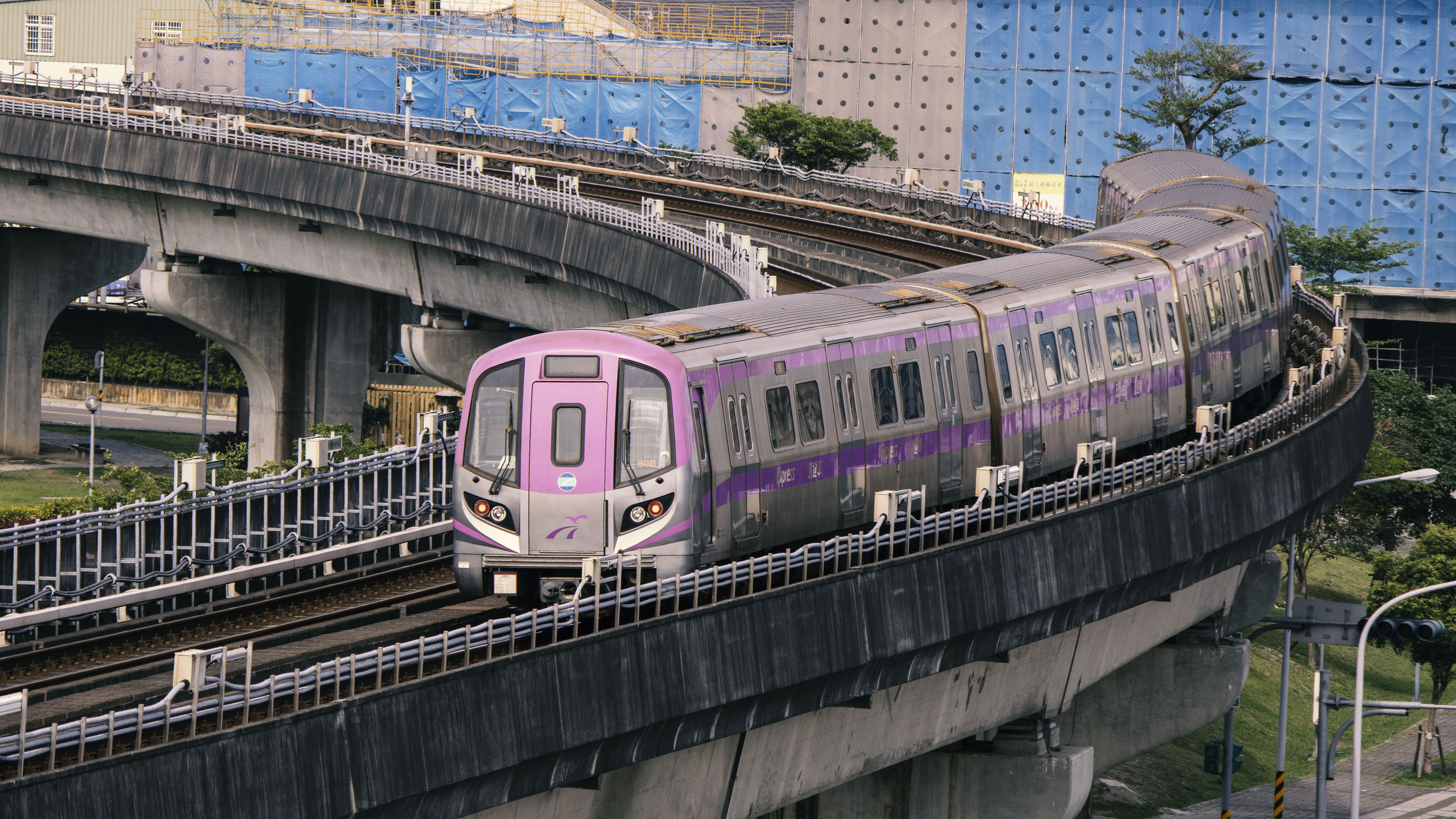
- 2001 leaving New Taipei Industrial Park, 9 May 2021

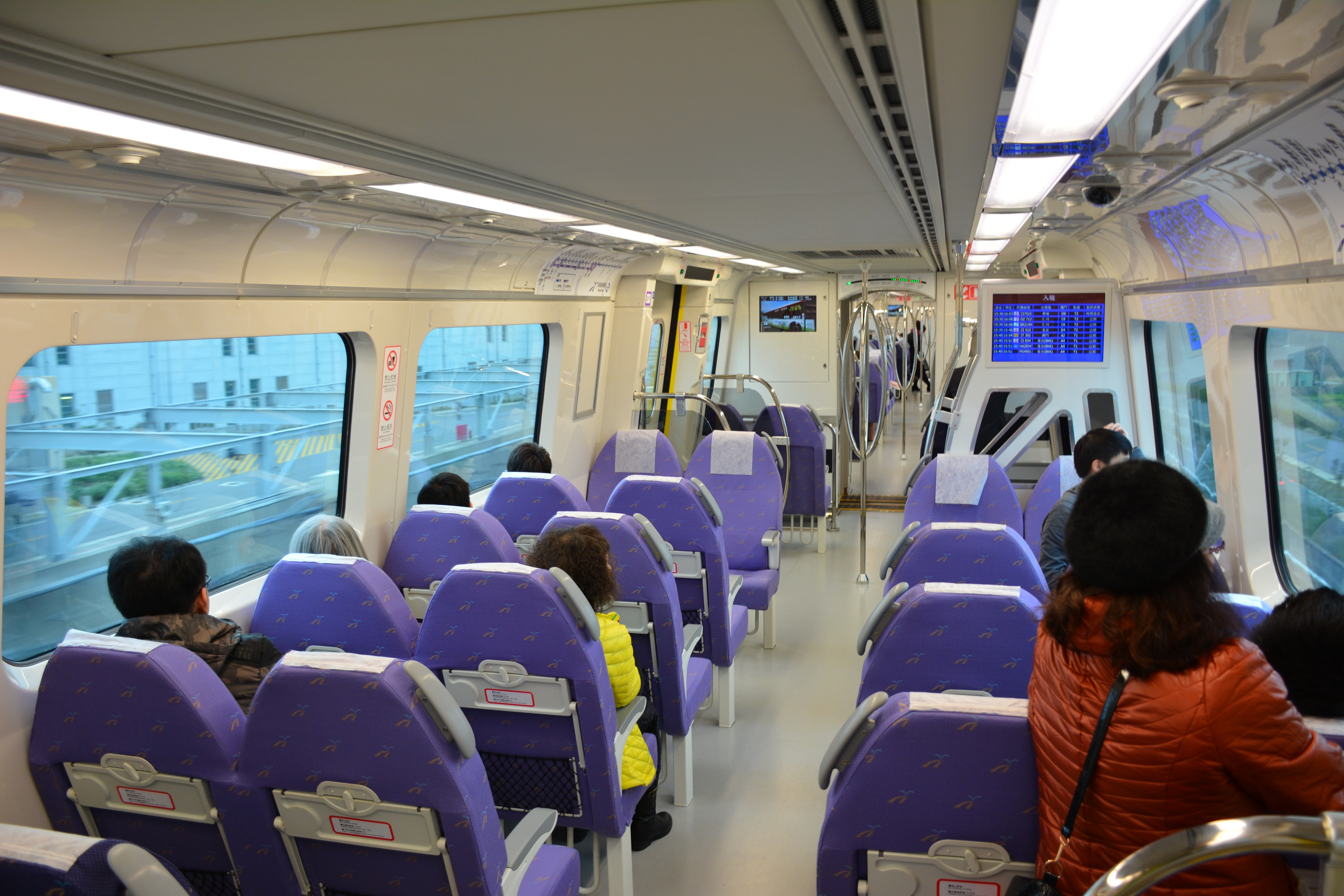
- Interior of a Taoyuan Metro 2000 series
- In service: 2017–present
- Manufacturer: Kawasaki
- Built at: Kobe, Hyōgo, Japan
- Constructed: 2011–2012
- Entered service: 2 March 2017
- Number under construction: 35 vehicles (7 sets; sets 2012–2018)
- Number built: 55 vehicles (11 sets)
- Formation: 5-car sets DM1–M1–M2–M3–DM2
- Fleet numbers: 2001–2018
- Capacity: 855 passengers
- Operator: Taoyuan Metro
- Depots: Luzhu; Chingpu
- Line served: Taoyuan Airport MRT

Specifications
- Car body construction: Stainless steel
- Train length: 102.31 m (335 ft 7 15/16 in)
- Car length: End cars: 20.78 m (68 ft 2 1/8 in); Intermediate cars: 20.25 m (66 ft 5 1/4 in)
- Width: 3.03 m (9 ft 11 5/16 in)
- Height: 3,763 mm (12 ft 4 1/8 in)
- Floor height: 1,133 mm (3 ft 8 5/8 in)
- Wheel diameter: 850–775 mm (33.5–30.5 in) (new–worn)
- Wheelbase: 2,100 mm (6 ft 11 in)
- Maximum speed: 110 km/h (68 mph) (design); 100 km/h (62 mph) (service)
- Weight: 157 t (155 long tons; 173 short tons)
- Traction system: Mitsubishi Electric MAP-184-75VD139B 2-level IGBT–VVVF
- Traction motors: 20 × Mitsubishi MB-5131-A 185 kW (248 hp) asynchronous 3-phase AC
- Power output: 3.7 MW (4,962 hp)
- Transmission: Westinghouse-Natal (WN) drive; gear ratio: 6.31 : 1 (101 / 16)
- Acceleration: 1.1 m/s^{2} (3.6 ft/s^{2})
- Deceleration: 1 m/s^{2} (3.3 ft/s^{2}) (service); 1.3 m/s^{2} (4.3 ft/s^{2}) (emergency)
- Electric systems: 750 V DC third rail
- UIC classification: Bo′Bo′+Bo′Bo′+Bo′Bo′+Bo′Bo′+Bo′Bo′
- Braking systems: Knorr-Bremse regenerative and electric command type brakes
- Safety systems: Siemens Trainguard MT CBTC (ATC, ATO, ATP)
- Coupling system: Scharfenberg Type 330
- Track gauge: 1,435 mm (4 ft 8 1/2 in) standard gauge

Notes/references
- Sourced from except where noted.

The Taoyuan Metro 2000 series, also referred to as Express Trains, are the electric multiple unit train types that are used for the limited-stop Express services on the Taoyuan Airport MRT.

== History ==
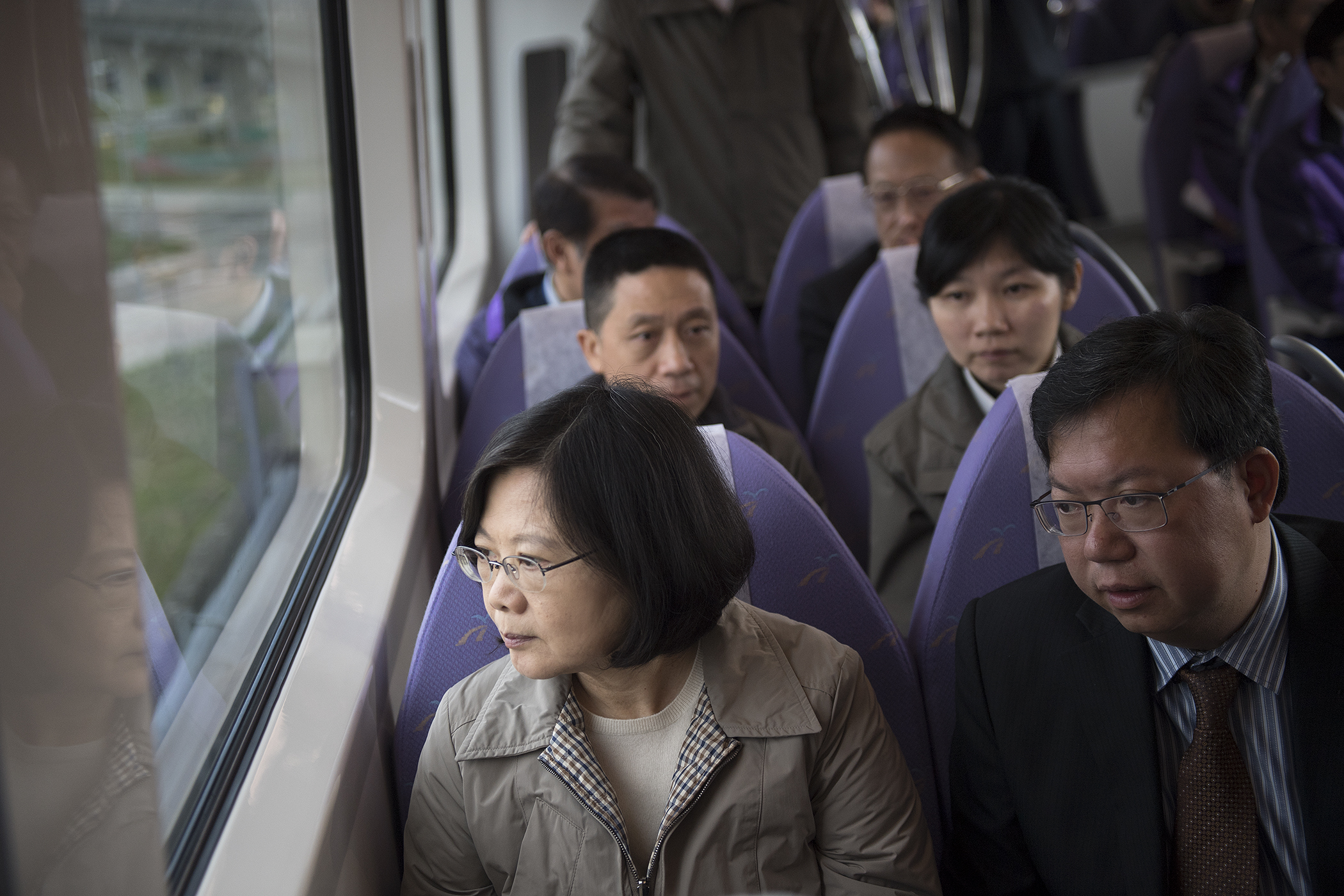
President Tsai Ing-wen of Taiwan riding a 2000 series, February 2017

In 2006, a consortium consisting of Marubeni Corporation, Kawasaki Heavy Industries and Hitachi was awarded a contract from the Bureau of High Speed Rail (BOHSR, now part of the Railway Bureau) of the Ministry of Transportation and Communications (MOTC) of Taiwan to supply the systems and build the depots for the Taoyuan Airport MRT project. Under the contract, Marubeni was in charge of overall project coordination, signalling communications and trackwork; Kawasaki responsible for rolling stock; and Hitachi for transformers. Altogether, 68 1000 series cars and 55 2000 series cars were supplied in the initial contract.

Unlike the 1000 series that were built by the Kawasaki-Taiwan Rolling Stock Company partnership, all the 2000 series trains were completely built up by Kawasaki at its Hyogo Works in Japan.

== Overview ==
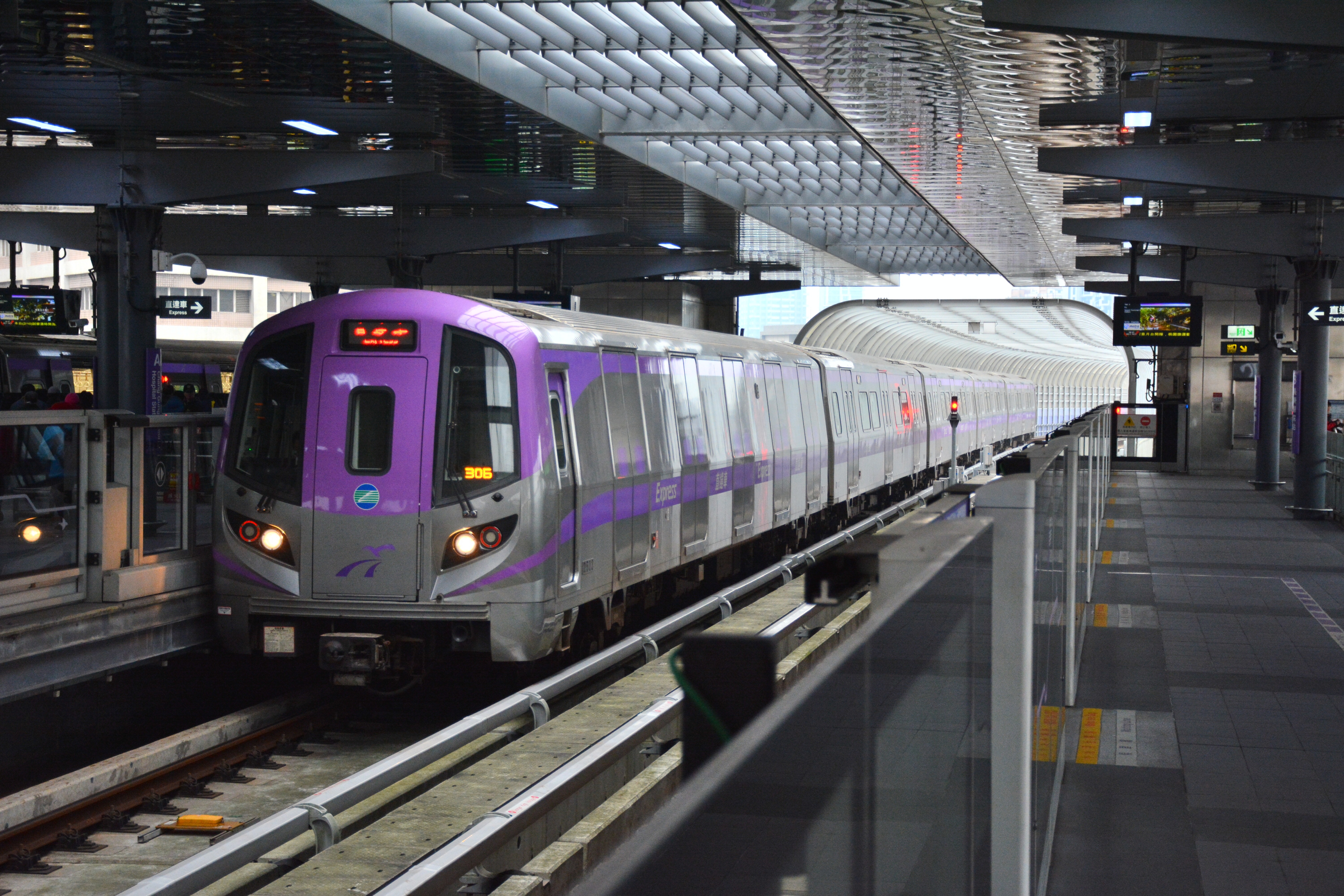
The fifth car of the 2000 series is a baggage car with 5 doors per side per car and does not have any side windows

The 2000 series was designed with identical car body structure and operating performance as the 1000 series and hence like the 1000 series, features an aerodynamic front made of a fiber-reinforced plastic (FRP) bonnet with an emergency detrainment door that folds outwards as a ramp, a stainless steel car body, plug doors to reduce noise and exterior LCD displays to denote the nature of the train service and the stations served. The only significant difference in the exterior is the livery, where the trains feature a purple color to denote its designation as an Express train instead of the blue of the Commuter 1000 series; the purple color evokes a flying Taiwan whistling thrush, which symbolizes "connecting the world".

In order to handle the continuous 4.92% gradient on the line, all bogies are motorized. The conditions of the rail line also required the trains to be designed to be able to handle a minimum turning radius of 100 m (328 ft 1 in) on the mainline and 90 m (295 ft 3 in) in the depot.

The interior of the passenger compartments of the 2000 series is configured similarly to many similar dedicated airport express trains across Asia such as the MTR Airport Express in Hong Kong, the Express Rail Link in Kuala Lumpur and the AREX in Incheon, with 2+2 forward-facing seats and dedicated luggage racks provided. While a fold-up table with a depression for a drink cup is provided at the back of the seats, consumption of food and beverages are prohibited on the Taoyuan Airport MRT. Much like the 1000 series, LED displays above train doors and triplicated vertical stanchion poles are provided. Special interior features included to accommodate airport passengers include dedicated luggage racks and LCD displays capable of displaying train route information and flight information. In addition, automated external defibrillators (AED) are also provided on board the trains.

The Taoyuan Airport MRT being the fifth dedicated airport rail link in Asia to offer in-town check-in services, which are provided at Taipei Main Station and Airport Terminal 2, the 2000 series also has a baggage container car as part of the onboard baggage handling system. Following the check-in of baggage at Taipei Main Station, baggage passes through the baggage handling system in the station before being loaded onto the baggage container car (i.e., the end car facing Taoyuan Airport and Huanbei). Once the train reaches the airport, the baggage is manually unloaded and is sent to the airport's own baggage handling system and the baggage container car will then return empty to Taipei Main Station to repeat this cycle. Such a system is identical to the K400 cars of the Hong Kong MTR Airport Express trains.

== Fleet numbering ==
The configuration of a five-car 2000 series trainset in revenue service is DM1–M1–M2–M3–DM2 with the DM1 car facing Taoyuan Airport and Huanbei and the DM2 car facing Taipei Main Station.

Each car is assigned its own four-digit serial number:

- The first digit denotes the train type, in this case the 2000 series.
- The second digit denotes the car position, with DM1 being 1, M1 being 2, M2 being 3, M3 being 4 and DM2 being 5.
- The DM2 car is a baggage container car that is not for passengers.
- The other two digits are the identification number of the train the car is part of. A full-length train of four cars consists of one identification number. For example, a train of five cars would have serial numbers 2501, 2401, 2301, 2201 and 2101, respectively.

== Gallery ==
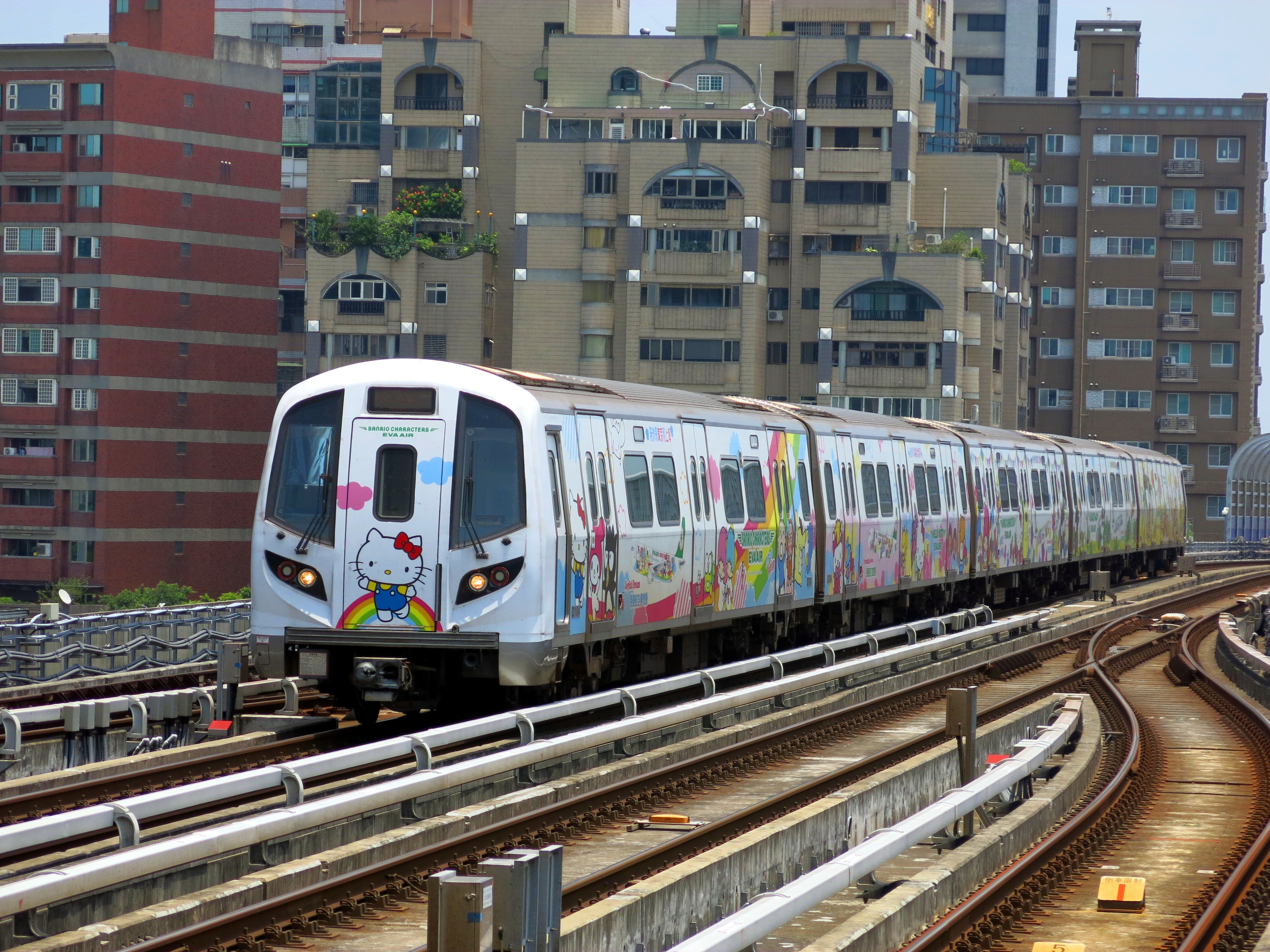
Set 2004 with "Hello Kitty" exterior livery sponsored by EVA Air to promote flights to Tokyo and Shanghai

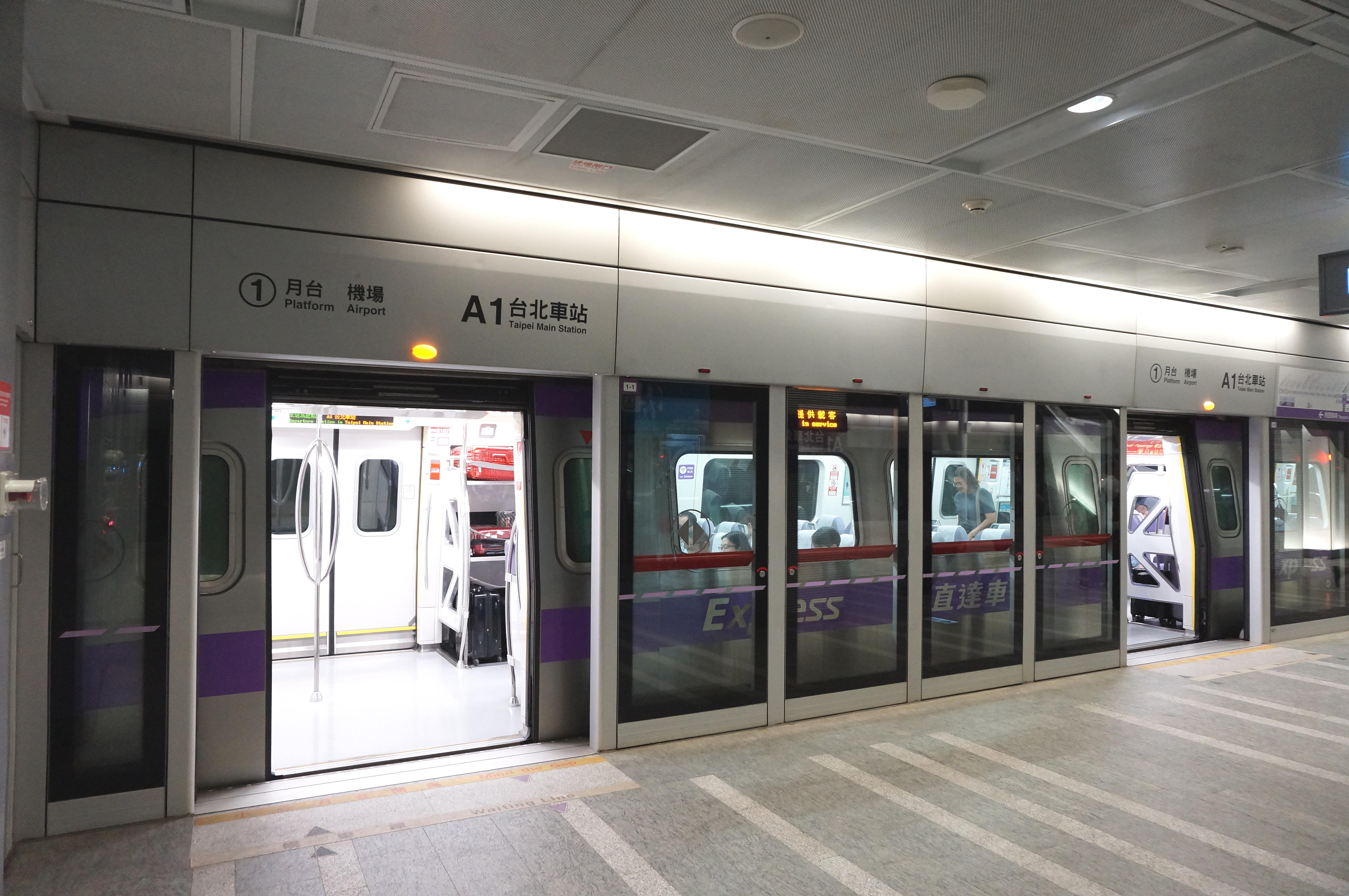
Set 2007 at Taipei Main Station in 2019

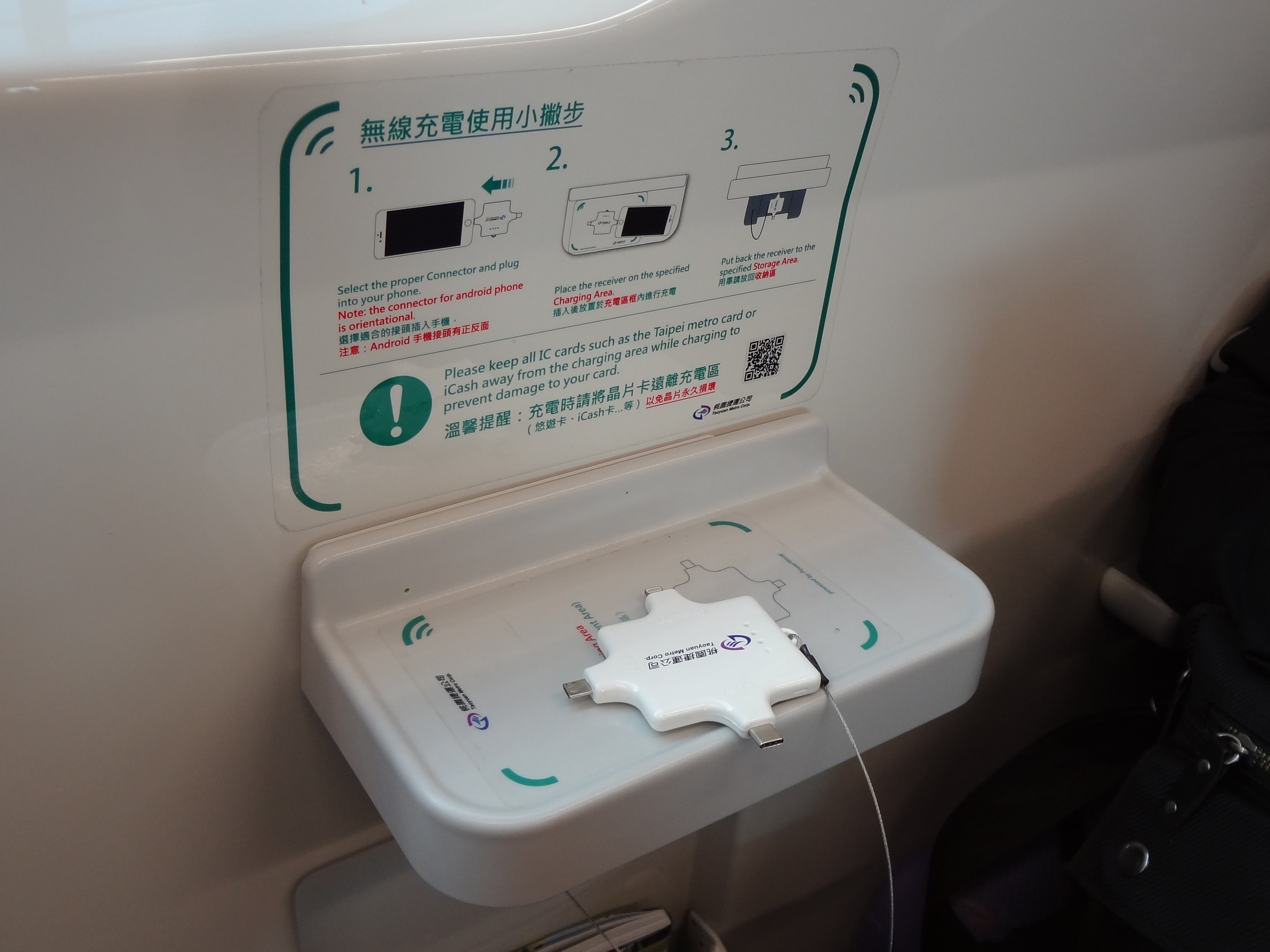
A wireless charging area as provided on board the train

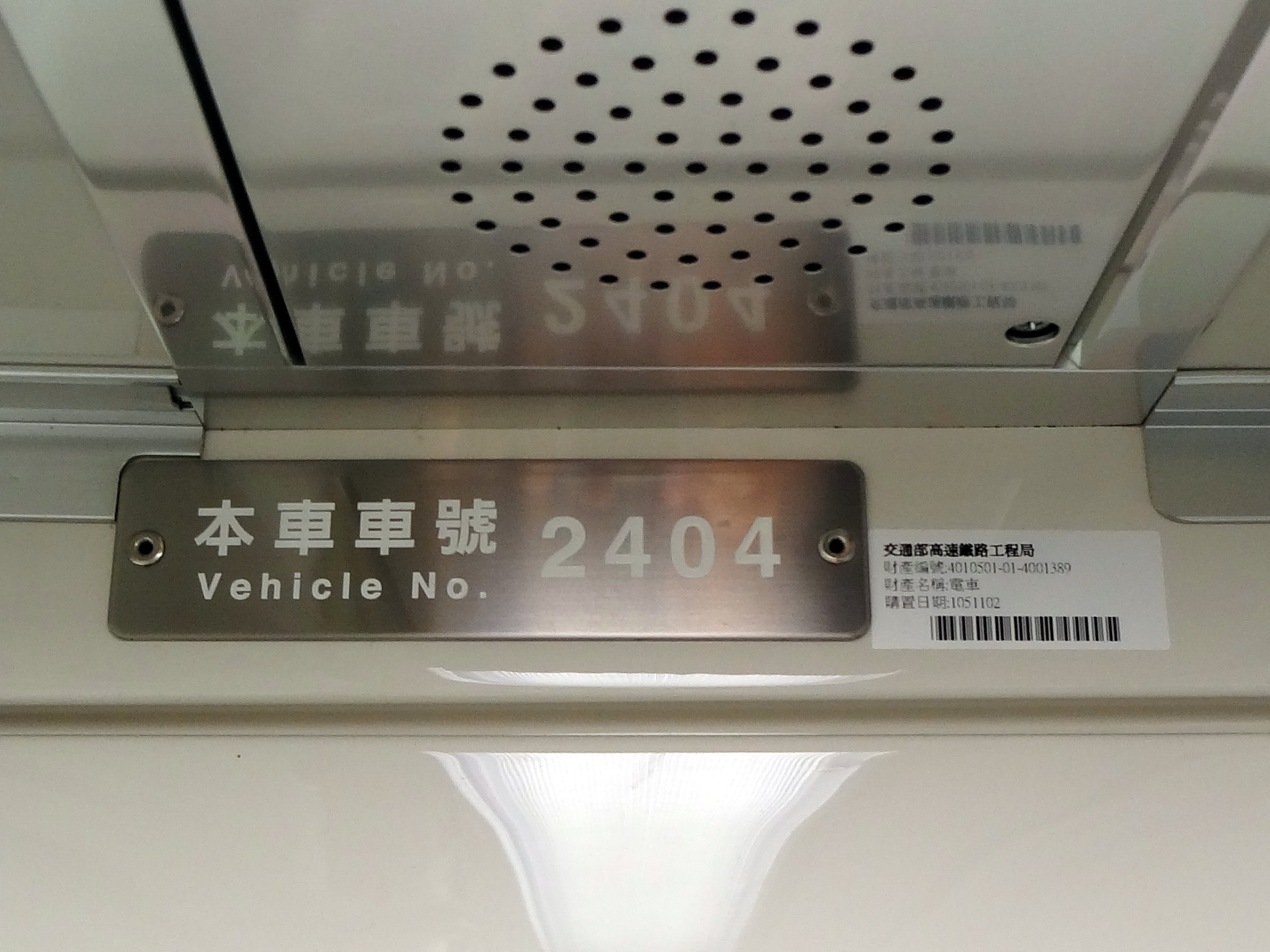
The fleet number plate and BOHSR property tag on a 2000 series train

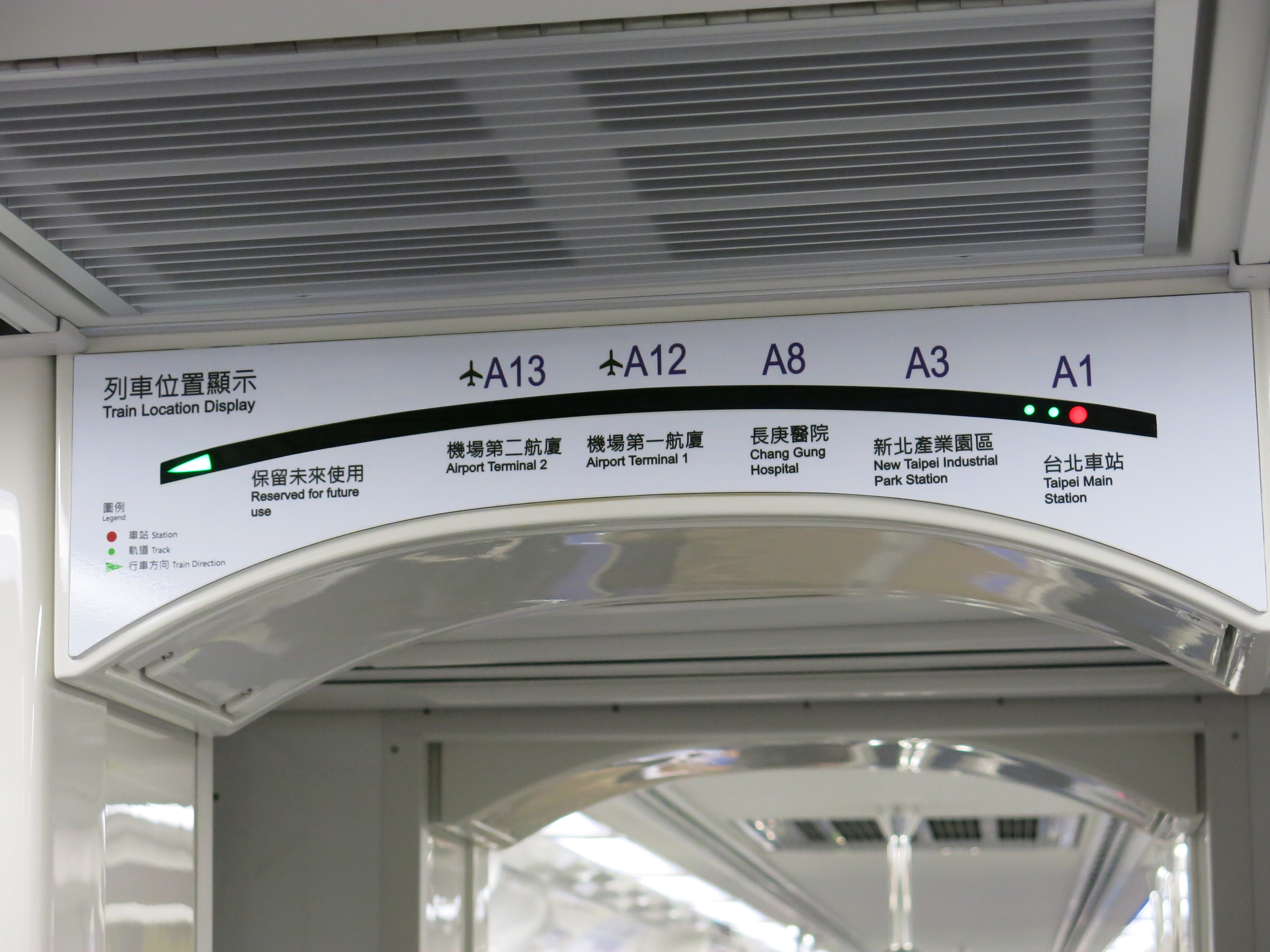
Train location display

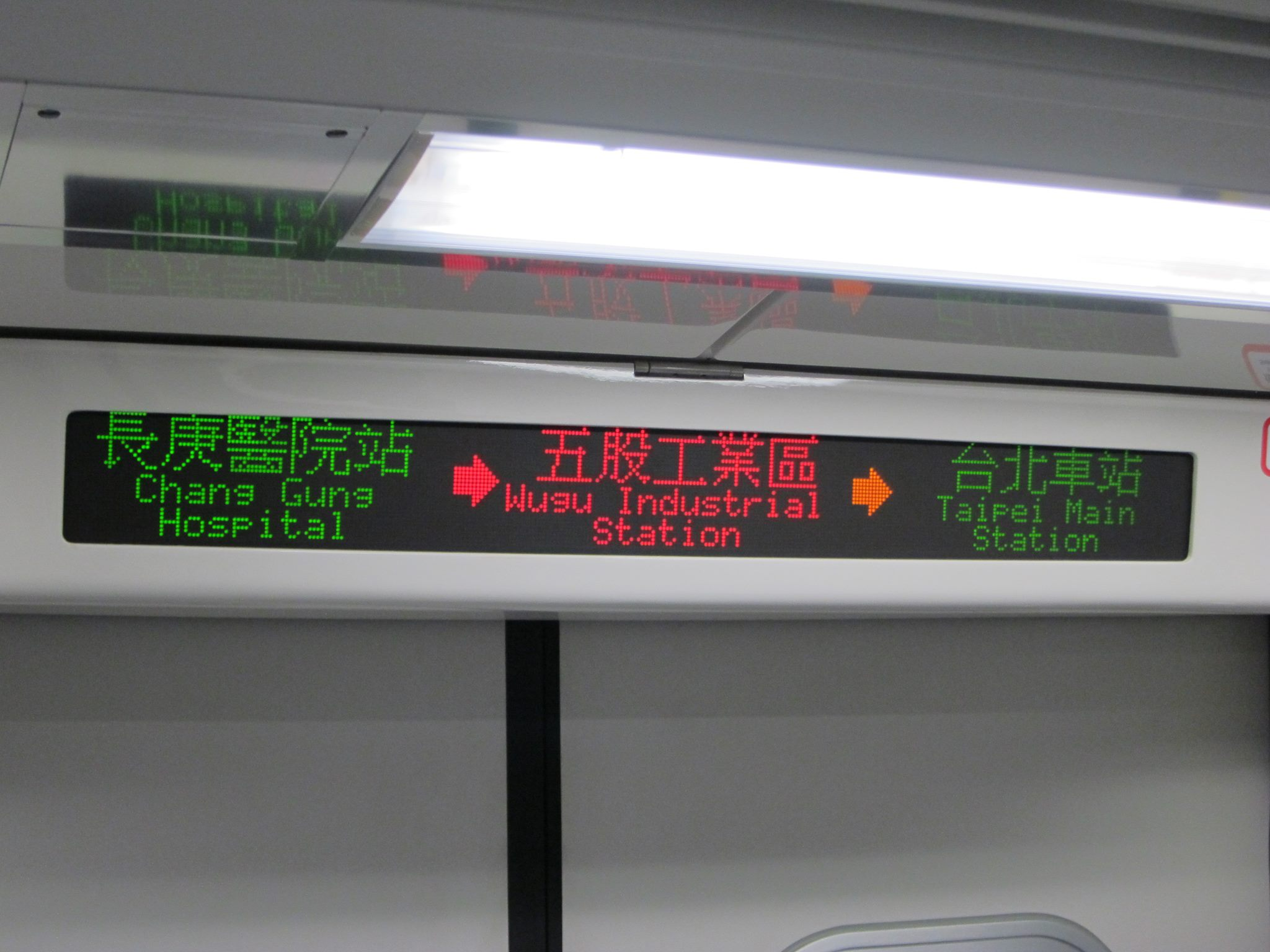
The LED passenger information display system as provided above the train doors

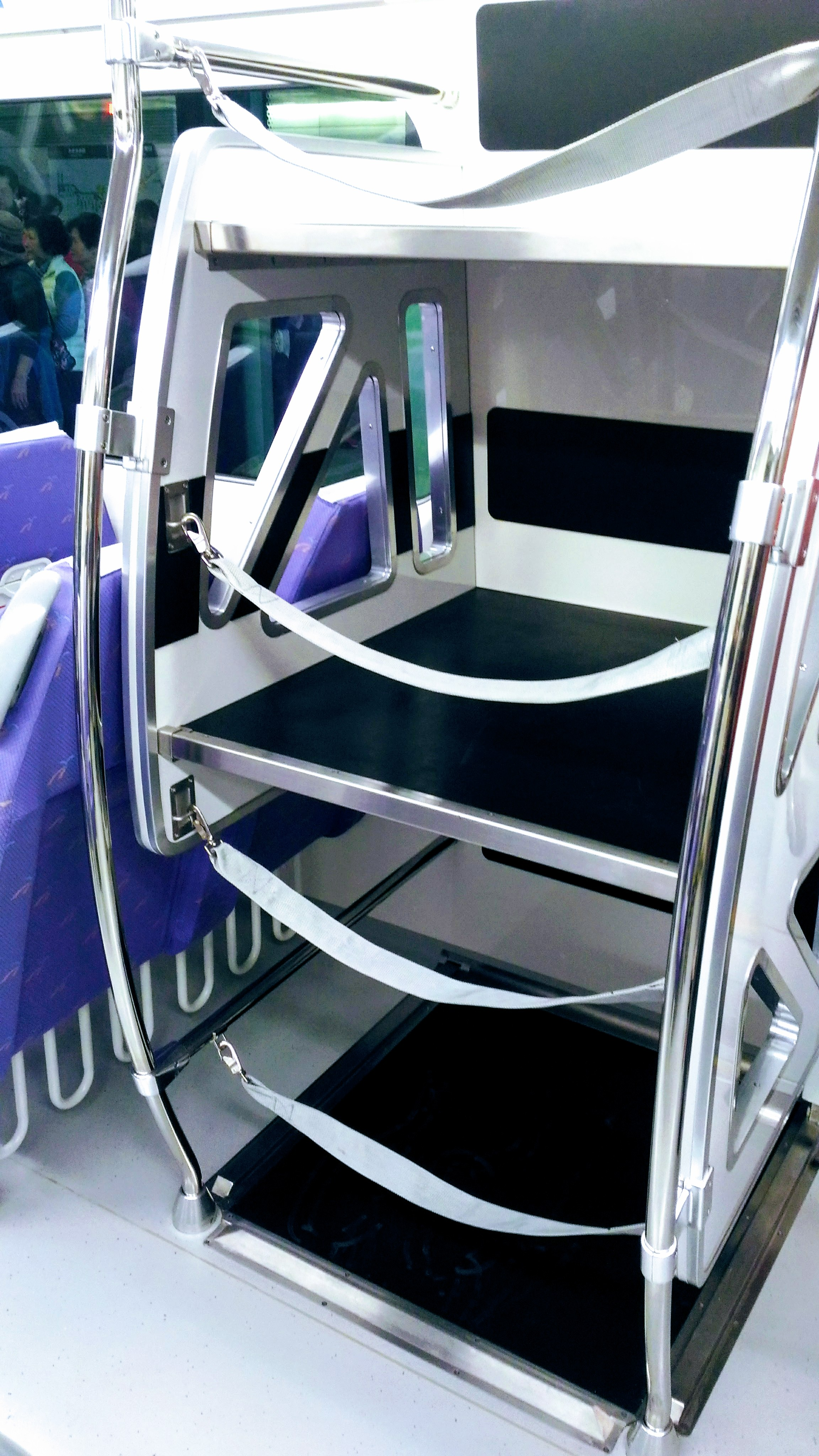
A baggage rack as provided on the passenger cars

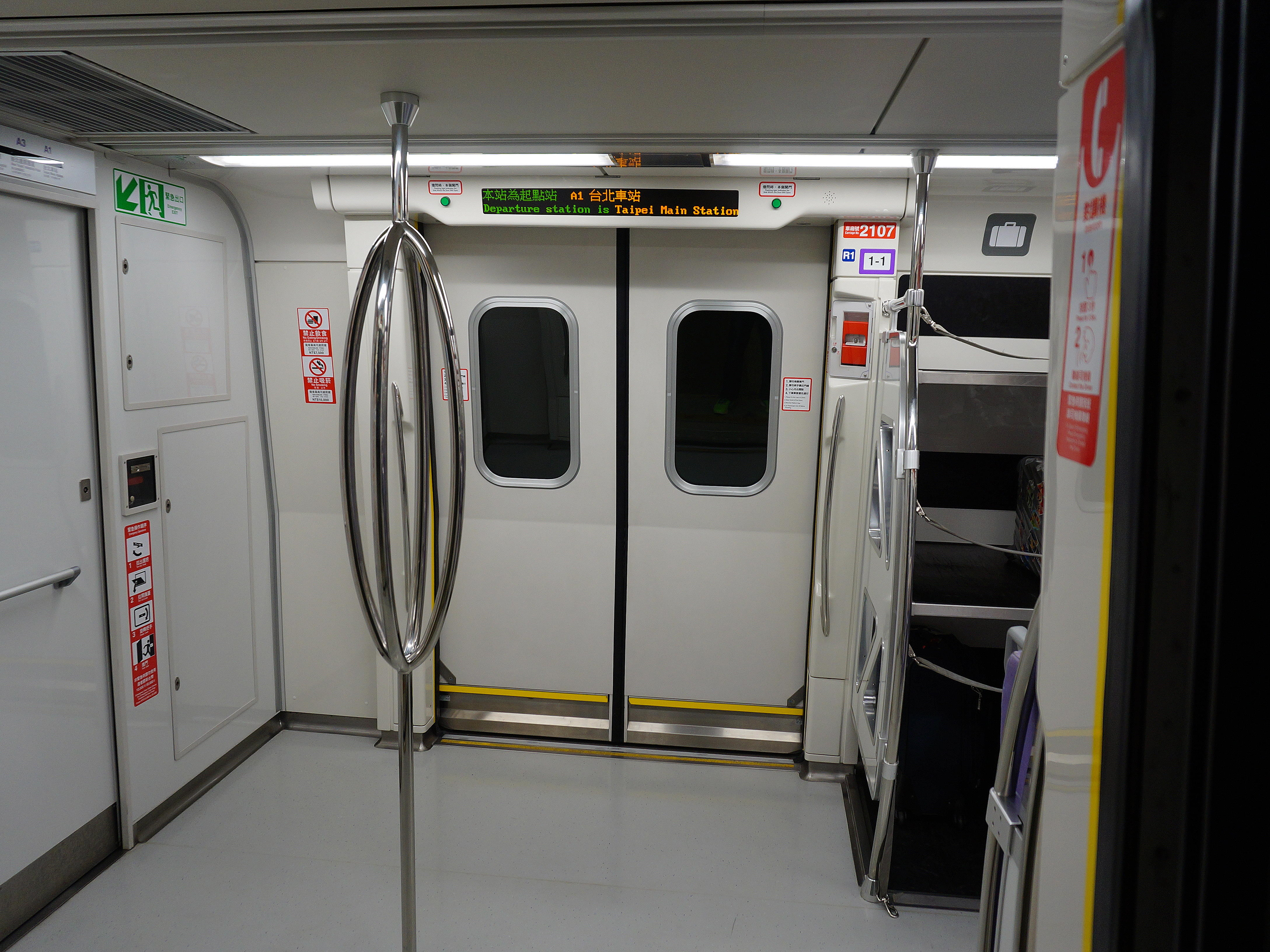
Plug doors of the 2000 series

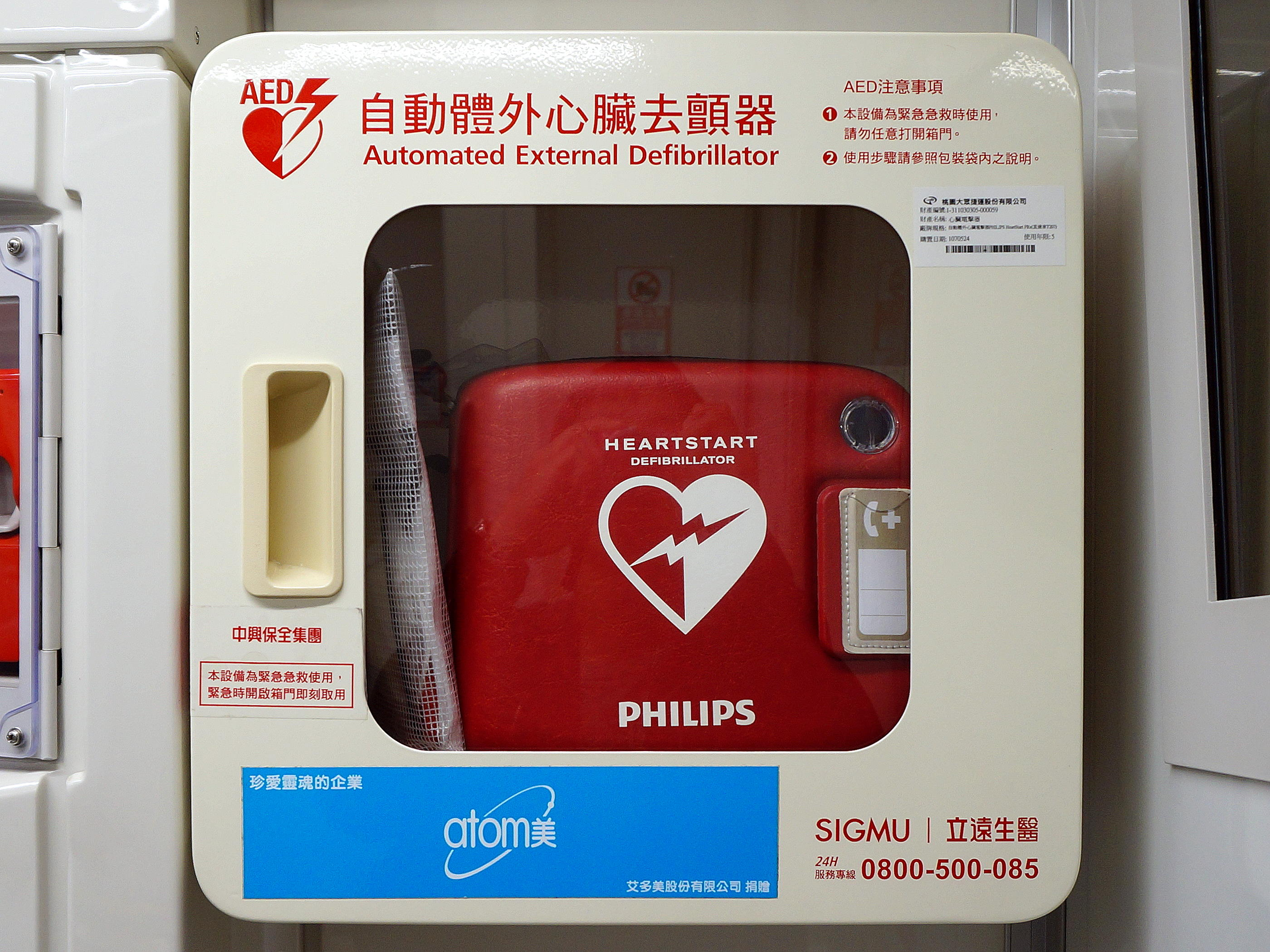
Onboard AED on the 2000 series

== See also ==
- MTR Adtranz-CAF EMU - A similar train operated by MTR of Hong Kong for Airport Express
- AREX 1000 series - A similar train used on the AREX serving Incheon Airport
- Taoyuan Metro 1000 series - The commuter counterpart of the 2000 series
