= Knock-down kit =

Collection of manufactured parts for assembly

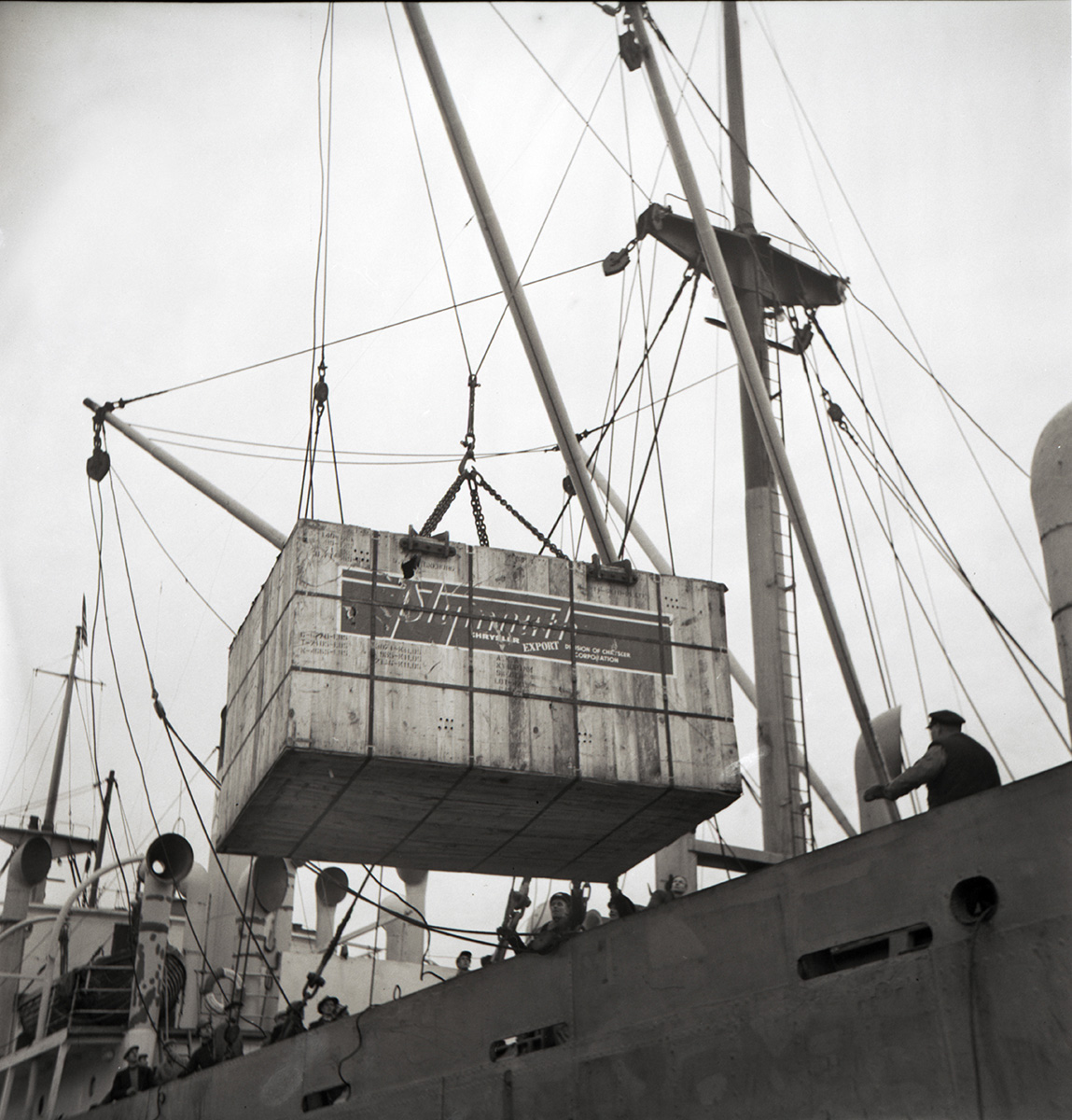
Plymouth CKD crate being unloaded in a Swedish harbor

A knock-down kit (also knockdown kit, knocked-down kit, or simply knockdown or KD) is a collection of parts required to assemble a product. The parts are typically manufactured in one country or region, and then exported to another country or region for final assembly. CBU, on the other hand, stands for "Completely Built Up" and signifies import of a finished product.

== Definitions ==
A common form of knock-down is a complete knock-down (CKD), which is a kit of entirely unassembled parts of a product. It is also a method of supplying parts to a market, particularly in shipping to foreign nations, and serves as a way of counting or pricing. CKD is a common practice in the automotive, bus, heavy truck, and rail vehicle industries, as well as electronics, furniture and other products. Businesses sell knocked-down kits to their foreign affiliates or licensees for various reasons, including the avoidance of import taxes, to receive tax preferences for providing local manufacturing jobs, or even to be considered as a bidder at all (for example, in public transport projects with "buy national" rules).

A semi-knocked-down kit (SKD) or incompletely disassembled kit (although it has never been assembled) is a kit of the partially assembled parts of a product. Both types of KDs, complete and incomplete, are collectively referred to within the auto industry as knocked-down export (KDX), and cars assembled in the country of origin and exported whole to the destination market are known as built-up export (BUX).

Technically, the terms "knock-down", "incompletely disassembled kit", and "kits of parts" are all misnomers because the knock-downs were never built up in the first place. The parts shipments are often not in the form of kits, but rather bulk-packed by type of part into shipping containers. The degree of "knock-down" depends on the desires and technical abilities of the receiving organization or government import regulations. Developing nations may pursue trade and economic policies that call for import substitution or local content regulations. Companies with CKD operations help the country substitute the finished products it imports with locally assembled substitutes.

Assembly plants that build products from knock-down kits are less expensive to establish and maintain than plants that also manufacture their own parts; they do not need modern robotic equipment, and the workforce may be less costly than in the kits' country of origin. Such plants may also be cost-effective for low-volume production. The CKD concept allows firms in developing markets to gain expertise in a particular industry. At the same time, the CKD kit exporting company gains new markets that would otherwise be closed.

== Automotive ==
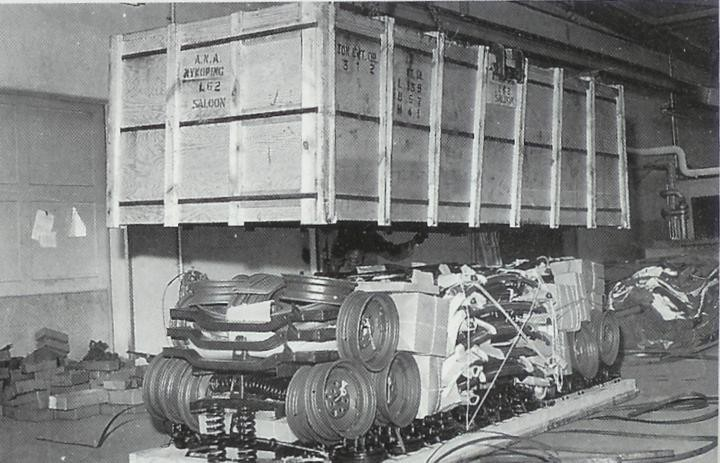
CKD kit as delivered to AB Nyköpings Automobilfabrik for assembly, probably a Plymouth

In the automotive industry, the most basic form of a vehicle in the KD kit lacks the wheels, internal combustion engine, transmission, and battery. They are either supplied as parts for assembly (a "complete" kit) or obtained from third parties (an "incomplete" kit); all of the interiors are already installed at the originating factory. The term SKD for semi-knocked-down refers to a kit with a complete, welded car body, usually coated or already painted. To gain extra tax preferences, the manufacturer needs to "localize" the car further, i.e., increase the share of parts produced by local manufacturers, such as tires, wheels, seats, headlights, windscreens and glass, batteries, interior plastics, etc., even down to the engine and transmission. At some point, the steel body could be pressed, welded, and painted locally, effectively making KD assembly only a few steps away from full-scale production.

By the time Henry Ford co-wrote his 1922 memoir, My Life and Work, the Ford Motor Company was already shipping car parts from its Michigan plants for final assembly in the regions of the United States or foreign countries where the cars would be sold.

During World War II, a significant number of US- and Canadian-built vehicles, most notably light and heavy trucks like Willys MB/Ford GPW/GPA, GMC-353/CCKW, and vehicles from the CMP family, were crated and shipped overseas in KD form, in various degrees of completeness, to Allied countries to sustain their war effort. Assembly lines were preferably set up in local automotive factories where appropriate tooling and equipment could be easily found, but, where needed, other types of buildings could be used, especially in on-the-field situations, and on occasion, even open-air rebuilding camps were set up, managed by military personnel. Owing to male mobilization, sometimes a female workforce was employed. CKD military vehicles could be stored for shipment in one-vehicle-per-crate form (or SUP, Single Unit Pack), or as several vehicles (usually two to three) divided in two or more crates. Vehicles shipped to certain countries could be lacking some items, such as cabs, beds, or tires, that were built and provided locally.

Mahindra & Mahindra Limited in India began its business in 1947 with assembling CKD Jeeps. Mahindra expanded its operations to include domestic manufacture of Jeep vehicles with a high level of local content under license from Kaiser Jeep Corporation and later American Motors Corporation (AMC).

In the 1950s and 1960s, Lotus Cars sold its Lotus Seven car in CKD form to avoid the UK purchase tax that applied to sales of fully assembled vehicles.

By 1959, and with the introduction of the Mini, British Motor Corporation (BMC) products were still either imported or assembled from CKD kits in several international markets.

In 1961, Renault began negotiations for a first partnership agreement with AMC to assemble Rambler automobiles in Europe. Beginning in 1962, and continuing until 1967, AMC also sold CKD kits of its passenger cars to Renault. They were assembled in Renault's factory in Haren, Belgium, and sold through its dealers in Algeria, Austria, Belgium, France, the Netherlands, and Luxembourg. The deal allowed AMC to sell its cars in new markets without significant foreign direct investment (FDI). The arrangement benefited the French automaker because its product range lacked large-sized cars, and it needed to offer an "executive" model for its European markets. The situation changed by 1977. By this time, AMC sought outside support for a new car in the sub-compact market segment, which led to the first of many agreements with Renault.

Volvo's Halifax Assembly Plant, which opened in 1963, completed vehicles in CKD form from Sweden for North American consumers. Halifax Assembly closed in December 1998.

In 1967, Rootes Group UK began exporting CKD Hillman Hunters to Iran where they were sold as the Paykan (meaning "arrow" in Persian). Bought by Chrysler in 1967 and then part of the sale to the PSA Group by the Chrysler Corporation of its European operations in late 1978, the Rootes business basis in Iran became the primer for the very significant PSA Peugeot Citroën business in Iran involving engine and CKD deliveries, particularly from the 405, introduced in 1990 and facelifted as the Pars in 1999 and 206 introduced in 2001. In 2004, Peugeot's partner Iran Khodro produced 281'000 Peugeot vehicles, securing a 36% market share.

In 1967 as well, Peugeot introduced CKD-based production of a light pick-up vehicle based on the Peugeot 403 in Peugeot's Berazategui factory (in Buenos Aires) under the name Peugeot 4TB. In 1973, this model was replaced by the 404 pick-up and later (1990) by the 504 pick-up. The 404 and 504 were massively marketed worldwide through local CKD assembly shops: the 404 was assembled, besides France and Argentina, in Australia, Belgium, Canada (at the SOMA plant shared with Renault), Chile, Ireland, Kenya, Madagascar, Malaysia, New Zealand, Nigeria, Portugal, Perú, Rhodesia, South Africa, and Uruguay; the 504, mainly in Argentina, Egypt, Nigeria, Kenya, South-Africa, Australia, and China by the Guangzhou Peugeot Automobile Company which developed a specific crew cab version.

In 1968, the independent German automotive firm, Karmann, began assembly of CKD kits of AMC's newly introduced Javelin for distribution in Europe. American Motors also provided right-hand drive versions of their automobiles to markets such as Australia, New Zealand, and South Africa. The components were shipped in containers to Australia from AMC's plants in Kenosha, Wisconsin, or Brampton, Ontario. Assembly of Rambler and AMC vehicles in Australia was done by Australian Motor Industries (AMI) in Port Melbourne, Victoria. Local content requirements were met by using Australian suppliers for the interiors (seats, carpeting, etc.) as well as for lights, heaters, and other components. Various Rambler models were assembled in New Zealand from the early 1960s until 1971 by Campbell Motors in Thames (later Toyota New Zealand), which had also built Toyota, Datsun (later known as Nissan), Hino, Renault, and Peugeot cars.

New Zealand had developed a car assembly industry as a means of import substitution and providing local employment, despite the small size of the local market. Following economic reforms in the 1980s, including the lowering of import tariffs, and the ability to import Australian-built vehicles duty-free under the CER agreement, many car companies ended assembly in New Zealand. They switched to importing completely built-up vehicles from Japan, Australia, or Europe. More significantly, the easing of import restrictions led to many used imports, because they were less expensive than locally assembled used cars, and outsold the 'NZ New' vehicles. The last companies to construct CKD kits in New Zealand were Toyota, Nissan, Mitsubishi, and Honda, which closed their plants in 1998 when the government announced plans to abolish import tariffs on cars.

Similarly, in Australia, KD cars were part-manufactured and/or assembled for certain models of the brands Citroën, Renault, Peugeot, Volkswagen, Mercedes-Benzes, Studebaker, Rambler, Singer, Triumph, Datsun, Hillman, Gogombobile, Mini Cooper and Volvo.

Other examples include Ukraine, which has almost prohibitive import taxes on finished cars. AutoZAZ assembles CKD kits of some Lada, Opel, Mercedes-Benz, and Daewoo cars. It went as far as adopting a version of Daewoo Lanos for full-scale production and equipping it with a domestic engine. The German automotive giant Volkswagen Group also produces SKDs in Ukraine at its Solomonovo plant, producing cars under its Škoda and Volkswagen Passenger Cars marques.

In Russia, KD assembling facilities are owned by Avtotor, which produced Hummer H2, BMW 3 Series, and BMW 5 Series in Kaliningrad, and Renault Logan in Moscow using facilities that once belonged to AZLK. In Kaluga, Volkswagen Group had a plant that was expected to have an annual output of 150,000 units.

Daimler AG has a CKD assembly plant in South Carolina that re-assembles Mercedes-Benz Sprinter vans for sale in the United States and Canada at Mercedes-Benz and Freightliner dealers, along with Dodge dealers before Fiat Group's takeover of Chrysler Group LLC—essentially to circumvent the 25% tariff on imported light trucks known as the "Chicken Tax". The Sprinter was eventually replaced in the Dodge/Ram lineup with the similar Ram ProMaster, a rebadged Fiat Ducato. Unlike the CKD Dodge Sprinter, the ProMaster is fully imported to the U.S. from a Chrysler plant in Mexico under of the North American Free Trade Agreement (NAFTA).

In 2009, Mahindra & Mahindra Limited announced that it would export pickup trucks powered by diesel engines from India to the United States in knockdown kit (CKD) form, again to circumvent the chicken tax. Mahindra planned to export CKDs to the United States as complete vehicles that will be assembled in the United States from kits of parts shipped in crates. However, Mahindra's United States CKD and export plans never materialized and were subject to several lawsuits.

In 2013, Tesla started operating an assembly plant in Tilburg, the Netherlands. It is used for the assembly of their Model S sedan and Model X SUV for the European Union, but not all of Europe since only cars imported to the EU benefit from circumventing the 10% import duty (e.g. cars to Norway are shipped directly from the United States). For the most part, the car is still manufactured in the Tesla Factory in Fremont, California. During the final assembly in the Netherlands, various parts are added to the car, most notably the rear subframe with the drive train as well as the battery pack.

== Buses ==
Motor Coach Industries opened its Pembina, North Dakota, assembly plant in 1963, as part of an expansion into the US market. Unfinished KD (knocked down) coach bodies are shipped from Winnipeg, Manitoba, by flatbed trailer and completed, outfitted, and delivered at Pembina. This practice simplifies US Customs and meets the "Buy America Act" provisions (49 USC 5323(j) and 49 CFR Part 661) for public agencies purchasing new equipment with federal funds.

North American Bus Industries opened operations in Anniston, Alabama, in 1993, with incomplete buses shipped from Budapest, Hungary, to Anniston for final assembly. NABI expanded production operations in Anniston to allow full production with its first fully domestically produced bus unit in 2008.

== Rail ==
The practice of selling "knocked down" railcars, called by that name, pre-dates the 20th century, as evidenced by an advertisement by JG Brill Company in the Street Railway Journal from 1898.

Many rail equipment builders have used kits or incomplete vehicles, often to meet local assembly and production requirements or quotas, or to satisfy tariffs. Some examples include:

- Between 1938 and 1951, the St Louis Car Company shipped PCC streetcar body shells and trucks north for assembly by Canadian Car & Foundry. The Toronto Transit Commission (TTC) PCC fleet was purchased and delivered in this method.
- Bombardier ships incomplete cars from its plant at La Pocatière Quebec, to Plattsburgh, New York, and (until 2002) Barre, Vermont, facilities for final assembly. These are to meet Buy America Act provisions for US public transit agencies and tariff rules. Since 2009 the Plattsburgh assembly plant has had full stainless steel welding and fabrication capability, allowing for cars to be fully assembled and completed on-site.
- Kawasaki Heavy Industries (KHI) and CSR Qingdao Sifang has a joint venture assembly plant in Qingdao, China, that carried out final assembly of first 10 sets of China Railways CRH2 high-speed trains, itself derived from E2 Series Shinkansen, using parts shipped from Kobe, Japan. Later the plant was tasked with the local manufacturing of further CRH2 train orders, through technology transfer from Japan.
- Alstom's Hornell, New York, assembly plant produces final completed cars using stainless body assemblies shipped from the Lapa plant in São Paulo, Brazil. Morrison-Knudsen used the same production method when it built new passenger cars at the Hornell shops in the 1990s.
- From their first US order from the South Shore Line in 1982 until the opening of a full-body manufacturing and assembly line in Rochelle, Illinois, thirty years later, Nippon Sharyo sent commuter train bodies from Japan to US finishers, including an American unit of Sumitomo.
- Hyundai Rotem opened an assembly facility in South Philadelphia, located in an industrial park off Christopher Columbus Boulevard. Car shells are assembled, outfitted, and completed for delivery at this site, which is served by Conrail on the Philadelphia Belt Line, allowing delivery of new cars by rail. The Silverliner V cars for Denver's RTD commuter rail and Philadelphia's SEPTA Regional Rail were purchased and delivered in this method.
- The London Underground 1995 and 1996 Stock fleets have aluminium bodies built by Alstom in Barcelona with assembly completed at the Metro-Cammell works in Washwood Heath, Birmingham.
- British Rail Class 385 fleets have aluminum bodies built by Hitachi in Kasado, Japan, with assembly completed at the Newton Aycliffe works in Country Durham.
- Taiwan Rolling Stock Company's assembly plant in Hsinchu County, Taiwan has assembled several rolling stock models using knock-down kits from Hitachi Rail Italy (C610 trains for Taipei Metro Circular Line), Kawasaki Heavy Industries (Taipei Metro C371, C381 and Taoyuan Metro 1000 series) and Nippon Sharyo (TRA EMU700 and EMU800 series)

== Aircraft ==
Unserviceable military aircraft are also sold as "knock-downs" after they have ended their service life, packaging them with serviceable aircraft. This allows them to be used for cannibalization of spare parts.

The European aircraft manufacturer Airbus uses knock-down kits to assemble A320 family aircraft outside Europe. The Airbus A320 final assembly line in Tianjin, China, assembles fuselage, wing, and tail sections made in Europe with avionics and engines made in the EU or the United States and locally sourced components for interiors. Airbus opened a similar A320 final assembly line in the United States in September 2015, located in Mobile, Alabama; again using European-made fuselages, wings, and tail sections. However, the Mobile final assembly line will use more locally sourced components than the Tianjin line; engines, interior components, and avionics will be sourced mainly from American suppliers. Both the Airbus Tianjin and Mobile plants receive their fuselages, wings, and tail sections from Europe via ocean freight using specially designed ships, as the plants are located in port cities.

== Housing ==
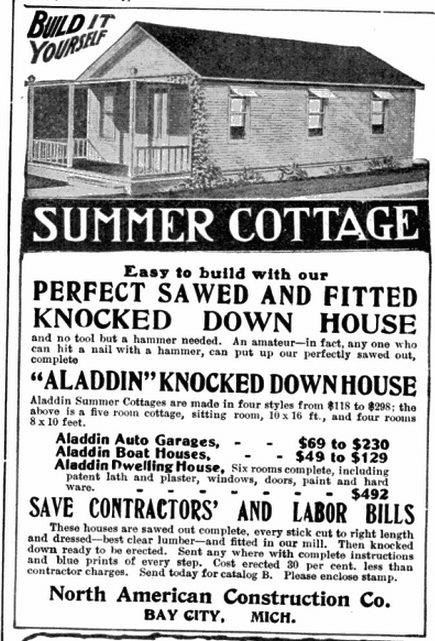
Advertisement for knocked-down kits for houses, in Popular Mechanics, May 1908

From 1908 to 1940, the Sears, Roebuck & Co. mail-order catalog offered over 400 styles of homes. Buyers were provided with all of the materials and the instructions needed to build a house. Everything that arrived by train or in the mail was designed to fit together, therefore buyers could build the houses themselves or hire contractors. Sears sourced building materials at a high volume, thus keeping prices low and competitive with the local builders.

== Furniture ==
Knock-down furniture dates back to at least the mid-19th century, with the 1859 Thonet No. 14 chair bentwood chair being easily disassembled for transportation. In the late 1940s, Australian designer Frederick Charles Ward founded a mail-order business for knock-down furniture in response to a lack of affordable furniture.

Swedish furniture company IKEA began selling flat-pack furniture in 1956.

== See also ==
- Rules of origin
