= 40th Ave & Airport Blvd–Gateway Park station =

Commuter rail station in Aurora, Colorado

40th Ave & Airport Blvd•Gateway Park
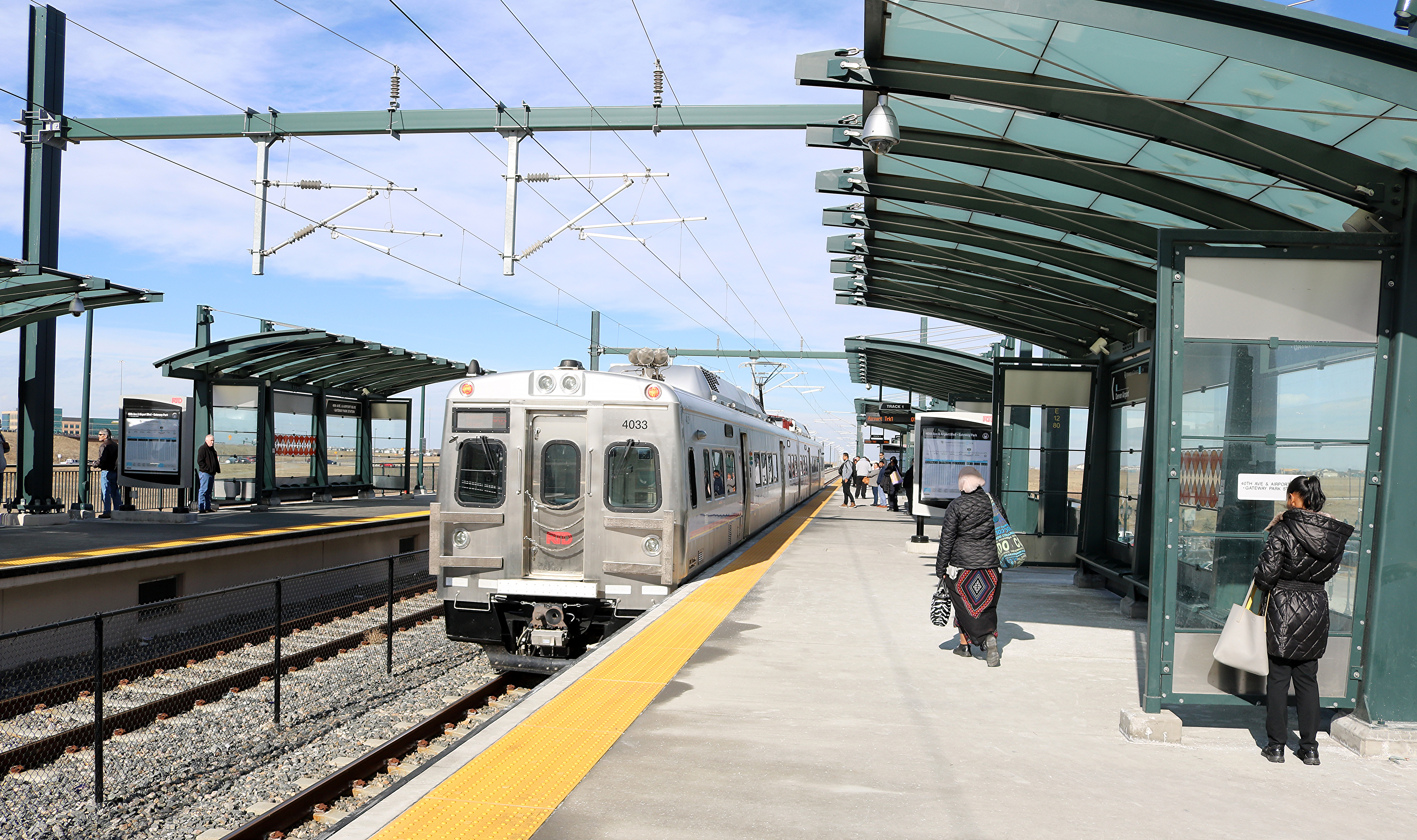
- An airport-bound train at 40th Ave & Airport Blvd–Gateway Park station

General information
- Other names: 40th Ave & Airport Blvd-Gateway Park; 40th & Airport-Gateway Park
- Location: 3900 North Salida Street; Aurora, Colorado
- Coordinates: 39°46′11.6″N 104°47′15.7″W
- Owner: Regional Transportation District
- Line: East Corridor
- Platforms: 2 side platforms
- Tracks: 2
- Connections: RTD Bus: 37, 42, 45, 121, 169, ATA

Construction
- Structure type: Embankment
- Parking: 1,079 spaces
- Accessible: Yes

History
- Opened: April 22, 2016

Passengers
- 2025: 3,641 (average daily)
- Rank: 5 out of 75

Services
Preceding station	RTD	Following station
Peoria toward Union Station	A Line	61st & Peña toward Denver Airport
Location

40th Avenue & Airport Boulevard–Gateway Park station (often abbreviated as 40th Ave & Airport Blvd-Gateway Park or simply 40th & Airport-Gateway Park) is a Regional Transportation District (RTD) commuter rail station on the A Line in Aurora, Colorado. The station opened on April 22, 2016, along with the rest of the A Line.

== Station layout ==
1F

Platform Level

Peña Boulevard
Side platform, doors will open on the right
Westbound
← toward Union Station (Peoria)
Eastbound
toward Denver Airport (61st & Peña) →
Side platform, doors will open on the right
Salida Street; bus bays; parking

40th & Airport-Gateway Park station is located in Aurora, but the line between Adams County and Denver County is immediately north of the station. As such, it primarily serves the Denver neighborhood of Gateway-Green Valley Ranch. Riders of westbound trains must cross the A Line tracks to exit the station, as there is no access to it from the west. The station is served by several bus routes and was integrated into a preexisting 1,079-space park-and-ride lot at the station site.

== Public art ==
40th Ave & Airport Blvd–Gateway Park station features a public art piece titled Time Present as a part of RTD's Art-n-Transit program. The sculptures, painted by Molly Dilworth, consist of painted metal polyhedrons. The piece sits at roughly 50 feet wide and 12 feet tall and is mounted on the station's east platform wall. Time Present was inspired by Buckminster Fuller and said to honor experimentation, innovation, and future problem solving.
