= 61st & Peña station =

Commuter rail station in Denver, Colorado

61st•Peña
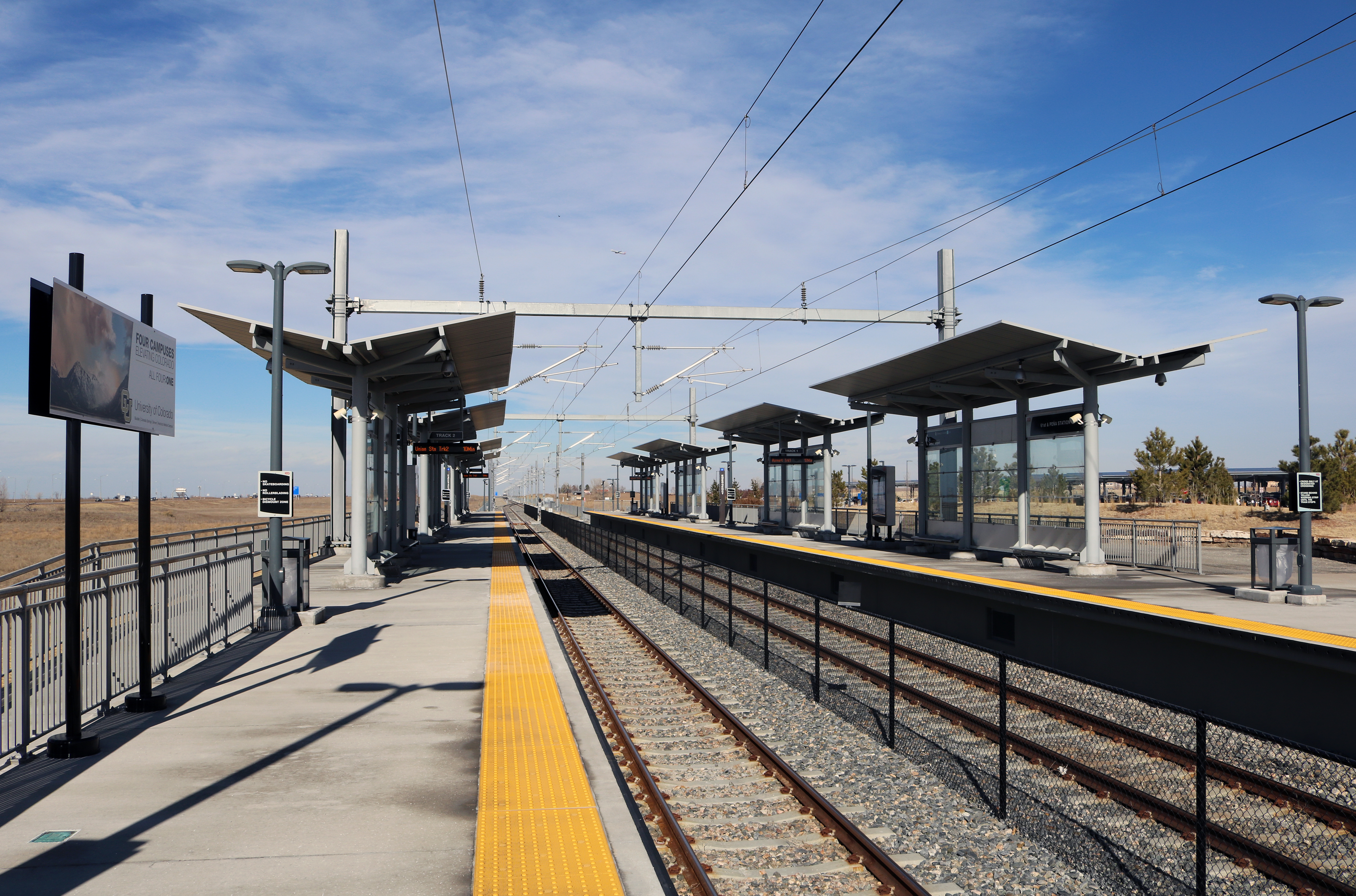
- 61st & Peña station

General information
- Location: 6045 North Richfield Street; Denver, Colorado
- Coordinates: 39°48′25.3″N 104°47′02.4″W
- Owner: Regional Transportation District
- Line: East Corridor
- Platforms: 2 side platforms
- Tracks: 2

Construction
- Structure type: At-grade
- Parking: 800 spaces (managed by Denver International Airport)
- Accessible: yes

History
- Opened: April 22, 2016

Passengers
- 2025: 1,740 (average daily)
- Rank: 15 out of 75

Services
Preceding station	RTD	Following station
40th Ave & Airport Blvd–Gateway Park toward Union Station	A Line	Denver Airport Terminus
Location

61st & Peña station (sometimes stylized as 61st•Peña) is a Regional Transportation District (RTD) commuter rail station on the A Line in Denver, Colorado. The station opened on April 22, 2016, along with the rest of the A Line.

The station, originally named "Peña Boulevard Station", was not initially in the public-private partnership construction and funding plans for the A Line. The station was a late addition to the A line project in 2014.

== Station layout ==
1F

Platform Level

Peña Boulevard
Side platform, doors will open on the right
Westbound
← toward Union Station (40th & Airport-Gateway Park)
Eastbound
toward Denver Airport (Terminus) →
Side platform, doors will open on the right
Richfield Street; parking

61st & Peña station has an airport-owned 800-stall park-and-ride lot. It is the only park-and-ride lot at an RTD station that is not managed by the agency. Airport hotels, offsite parking lots, and other amenities are located in the vicinity of the station, and are accessible to the airport via the A Line. It is the only station on the A Line with no onward bus connections.

The area surrounding the station is planned to be developed into a mixed-use, transit-oriented development called “Peña Station,” with offices and housing, part of a proposed airport city surrounding Denver International Airport. Nearby developments may include up to 2,500 residential units, 1,500 hotel rooms, 500,000 square feet (46,000 m^{2}) of retail space, and 1 to 1.5 million square feet (93,000 to 139,000 m^{2}) of offices. As of 2026, the land surrounding the airport is primarily undeveloped greenfield land, with no timeline for buildout.
