= A Line (RTD) =

Commuter rail line in the Denver metropolitan area

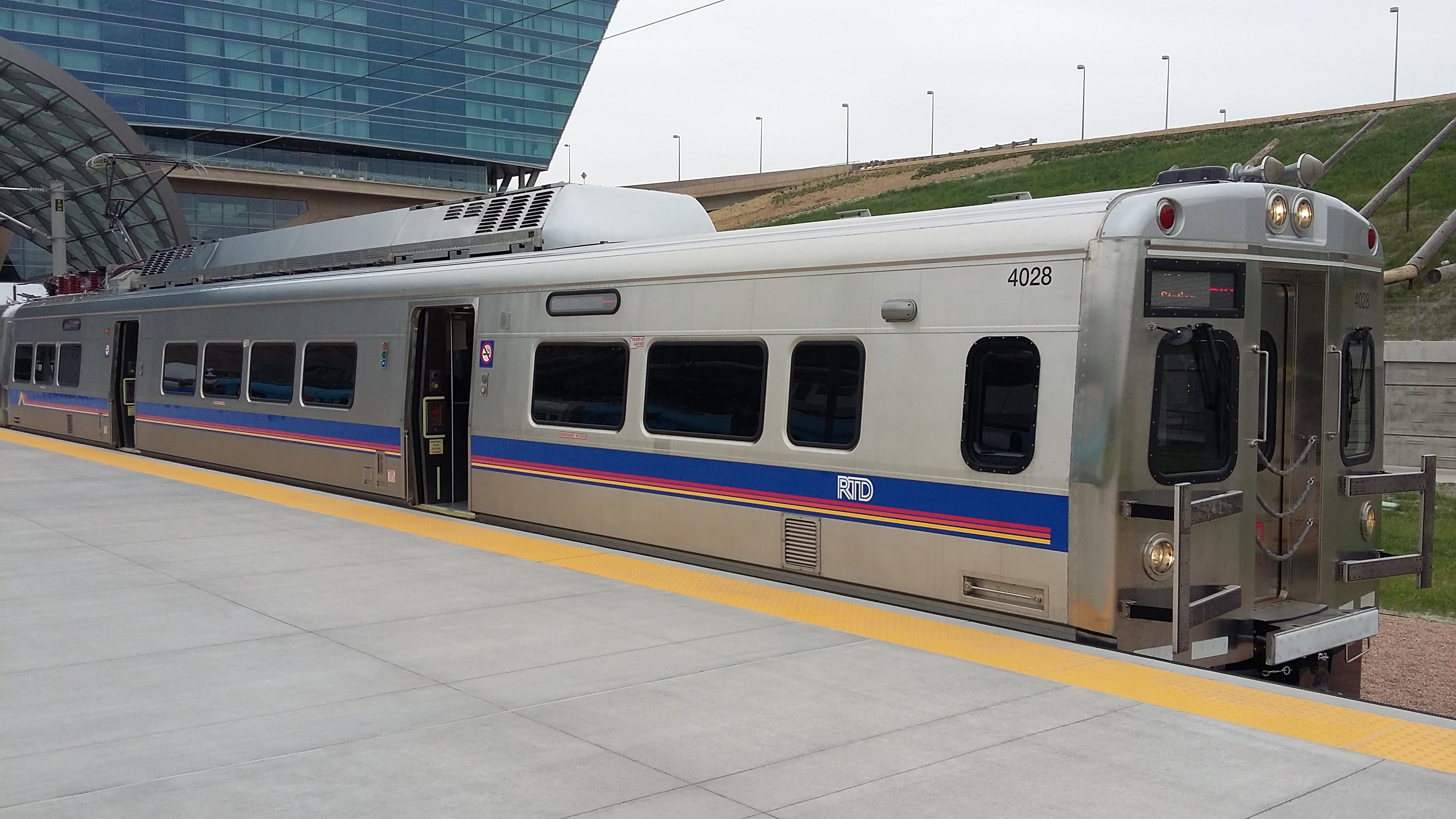
- A Line train at the Denver Airport station

Overview
- Other name: East Line
- Owner: Regional Transportation District
- Locale: Denver metropolitan area
- Termini: Union Station; Denver Airport
- Stations: 8
- Website: Official website

Service
- Type: Commuter rail
- System: RTD Rail
- Operator: Denver Transit Partners
- Rolling stock: Hyundai Rotem Silverliner V
- Daily ridership: 20,600 (2019)
- Ridership: 6,184,000 (FY2023, annual)

History
- Opened: April 22, 2016; 10 years ago

Technical
- Line length: 23.5 mi (37.82 km)
- Track gauge: 4 ft 8 1/2 in (1,435 mm) standard gauge
- Electrification: Overhead line, 25 kV 60 Hz AC
Route map
A Line highlighted in blue

The A Line is a Regional Transportation District (RTD) commuter rail line that serves stations in Denver and Aurora, Colorado. The A Line opened on April 22, 2016, is owned by RTD, and is operated by Denver Transit Partners. During planning and construction, it was also known as the East Line. The line received its letter designation to denote service to Denver International Airport and Aurora. It is colored light blue on system maps.

The A Line's western terminus is at Union Station in downtown Denver, and its eastern terminus is at Denver Airport station, located directly beneath Denver International Airport. It was the first commuter rail line in the RTD rail network to open. With over 6 million passengers using the A Line in 2023, it is by far RTD's most popular rapid transit route of any kind - commuter rail, light rail, or bus.

== Route ==
The A Line departs Union Station on Track 1, closest to Wynkoop Street and the station house. It follows a pre-existing Union Pacific right-of-way northeast from Union Station, passing Coors Field, and turning due east at 40th & Colorado station. Interstate 70 is located just north of the station; the A Line remains within a mile of I-70 as it travels east through Denver's Central Park neighborhood and northern Aurora. Transfers can be made to the R Line at Peoria station, which travels south through Aurora to the Denver Tech Center, Centennial, and Lone Tree.

The A Line turns north after Peoria station and begins to parallel Peña Boulevard on its own right-of-way, starting at 40th & Airport station. Peña Boulevard was designed with an extra wide median between its inbound and outbound lanes that could have been used for rail transit, though RTD ultimately decided to build the A Line offset to its east. The A Line re-enters Denver north of 40th & Airport, with one final intermediate stop at 61st & Peña station. The station provides access to airport hotels and off-site parking. Denver International Airport is 8 miles northeast of 61st & Peña; the A Line takes 12 minutes to cover this distance. The A Line crosses over Peña Boulevard and E-470 before terminating at Denver Airport station. A set of triple escalators pass underneath the Westin hotel, and bring passengers from both the A Line and the Denver Airport bus concourse to Level 5 of the Jeppesen Terminal.

== History ==
Mass transit had been under consideration for the corridor between downtown Denver and Denver International Airport since the latter was proposed in the 1980s. The project gathered momentum in 1997 when a Major Investment Study was completed for the corridor, encouraging fixed-guideway mass transit, highway widening, and general improvements. The project was approved as part of the FasTracks transit expansion package in November 2004 and was approved by the Federal Transit Administration in November 2009. In July 2007, it was decided to use electric instead of diesel propulsion over speed and air pollution concerns.

Groundbreaking was held in August 2010. The A Line was the second line of RTD's FasTracks expansion plan to be constructed, after the W Line, and was constructed and operated under the Eagle P3 public–private partnership. The first electric multiple unit railcars were pulled along the route in April 2015, commencing testing and commissioning of the line. Revenue service would begin one year later in April 2016.

When it opened, the University of Colorado system was awarded a 6-year contract for the naming rights to the A Line. As such, it was known as the University of Colorado A Line from its opening until the contract expired in 2022. Despite its former title, the line does not serve any of the system's campuses, though some stations on the line offer relatively short connections to the University of Colorado Denver (at Union Station) and the University of Colorado Anschutz (at Peoria station).

=== Operational issues ===
From the A Line's opening in 2016 until 2019, there were frequent operational issues with the crossing gates due to software problems, resulting in lengthy delays. Crossing arms often came down too early and stayed down for too long, and did not react dynamically to variance in arrival and departing times. The system's frequent malfunctions resulted in the Federal Railroad Administration (FRA) mandating flaggers along the line as a safety precaution. Denver Westword listed the A Line on its 2016 "Colorado Hall of Shame." The A Line shares crossings with Union Pacific tracks, adding to the complexity of its crossing gates. The A Line's crossing gate problems forced the delay of a different FasTracks commuter rail line, the G Line, due to similar malfunctions and the need for flaggers during testing. The G Line eventually began operating without flaggers in 2019.

In June 2018, the FRA approved a plan to remove the flaggers monitoring the crossing gates along the A Line. This approval also allowed local jurisdictions to submit requests to the FRA to establish "quiet zones", removing the need for trains crossing through the gates to blow their horns. RTD applied for nine such zones in 2019, and all were granted.

The A Line's crossing gate issues were resolved and the flaggers along the line were removed in early 2019. It carried its 50 millionth rider in 2024, and by that time its reputation had reversed. It is now considered one of the most reliable services in the RTD network.

=== Rolling stock ===
The A Line uses Hyundai Rotem Silverliner V railcars, originally designed and built for the Southeastern Pennsylvania Transportation Authority (SEPTA). RTD is the only agency that operates these vehicles outside of the Philadelphia metropolitan area.

=== Planned connection to Five Points ===
FasTracks provisions for a connection to the L Line at 38th & Blake station. This would connect A Line passengers to Denver's Five Points neighborhood and 16th Street without needing to transfer to the 16th Street FreeRide at Union Station. As of 2026, this extension is unfunded and there is no estimated completion date.

== Stations ==
Fare zone	Station	Municipality	Opened	Major connections & notes
Local	Union Station	Denver	April 22, 2016	California Zephyr; 16th Street FreeRide
Local	38th & Blake	Denver	April 22, 2016	Park and ride: 200 spaces
Local	40th & Colorado	Denver	April 22, 2016	Park and ride: 200 spaces
Local	Central Park	Denver	April 22, 2016	Park and ride: 1,500 spaces
Local	Peoria	Aurora	April 22, 2016	Park and ride: 550 spaces
Local	40th Ave & Airport Blvd–Gateway Park	Aurora	April 22, 2016	Park and ride: 1,079 spaces
Local	61st & Peña	Denver	April 22, 2016	Parking: 800 (paid)
Airport	Denver Airport	Denver	April 22, 2016	Denver International Airport
