= Peoria station =

Commuter and light rail station in Aurora, Colorado

Peoria
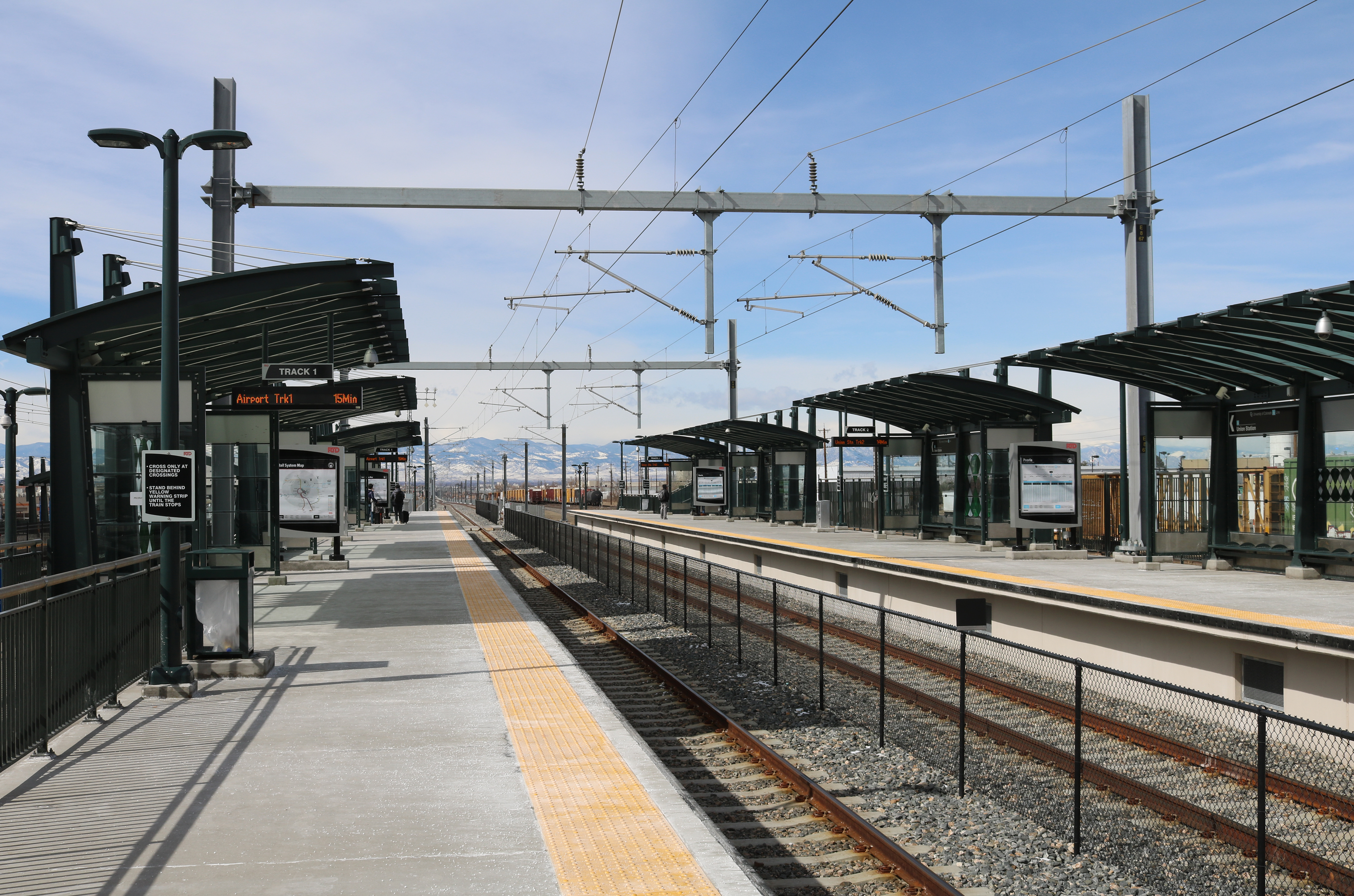
- Peoria station A Line platforms

General information
- Location: 11501 East 33rd Avenue; Aurora, Colorado
- Coordinates: 39°46′03.2″N 104°51′01.5″W
- Owner: Regional Transportation District
- Lines: East Line (A Line); I-225 Corridor (R Line)
- Platforms: 4 side platforms
- Tracks: 4
- Connections: RTD Bus: 37, 45, 121, 153

Construction
- Structure type: At-grade
- Parking: 550 spaces
- Cycle facilities: 10 lockers, 10 racks
- Accessible: Yes

History
- Opened: April 22, 2016 (A Line); February 24, 2017 (R Line)

Passengers
- 2025: 4,592 (average daily)
- Rank: 3 out of 75

Services
Preceding station	RTD	Following station
Central Park toward Union Station	A Line	40th Ave & Airport Blvd–Gateway Park toward Denver Airport
Terminus	R Line	Fitzsimons toward RidgeGate Parkway
Location

Peoria station is a Regional Transportation District (RTD) station in Aurora, Colorado. The station is served by the A Line, a commuter rail line from Union Station in downtown Denver to Denver International Airport, and the R Line, a light rail line that begins at the station and runs south to Centennial and Lone Tree.

Peoria and Union Station are the two locations where RTD commuter rail and light rail meet, and Peoria is the only station facilitating a cross-platform transfer between the two systems. The A Line began service at Peoria station on April 22, 2016,, and the R Line began service on February 24, 2017.

== Station layout ==
1F

Platform Level

Union Pacific corridor
Side platform, doors will open on the right
Westbound
← toward Union Station (Central Park)
Eastbound
toward Denver Airport (40th & Airport-Gateway Park) →
Side platform, doors will open on the right
Side platform, doors will open on the right
Southbound
toward RidgeGate Parkway (Fitzsimons) →
Southbound
toward RidgeGate Parkway (Fitzsimons) →
Side platform, doors will open on the left
East 35th Place; bus bays; parking

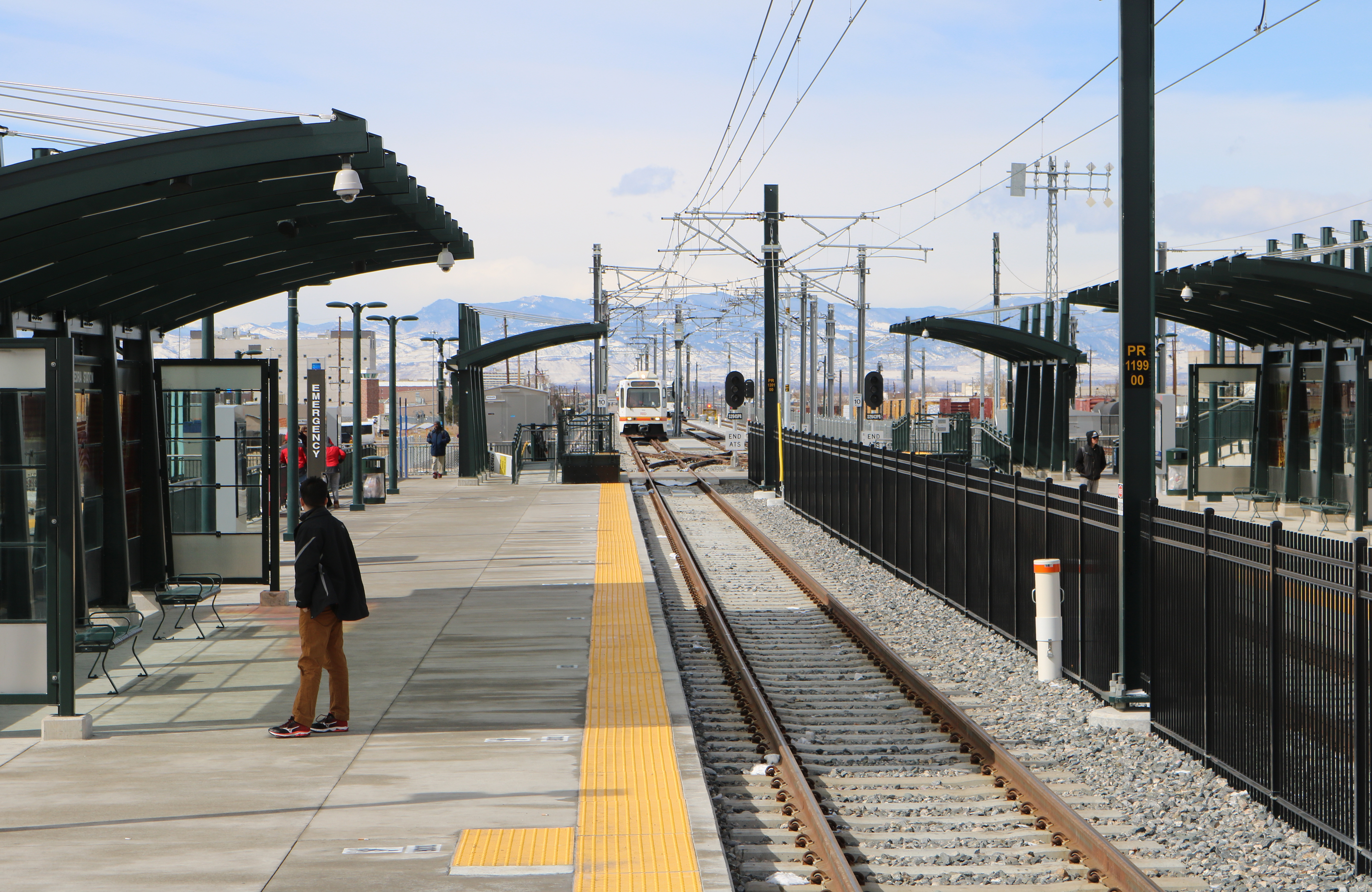
Peoria station R Line platforms

Peoria station contains four tracks and four side platforms, two each for the A and R Lines. The R Line platforms are closest to the parking lot and bus bays, and are at ground level. Most R Line trains reverse from the track on which they terminate and return to Lincoln station, though some go out of service into a yard west of the station.

The A Line platforms are adjacent to the R Line platforms, and are elevated for level boarding onto the A Line's commuter rail cars. Both A Line platforms and one R Line platform require crossing railroad tracks to access. There are also stairs and a ramp between the A Line and R Line platforms due to the different boarding height between their respective cars.

The station can be accessed via North Newark Street and East 35th Place, which both dead-end into the station's parking lot. Peoria station is additionally served by several bus routes. Travel times on the A Line from the station to downtown Denver and Denver Airport are approximately 20 minutes each. Travel time on the R Line to its southern terminus at Lincoln is approximately 1 hour.

== Public Art ==
Peoria station features Biota, an illuminated sculpture created by Blessing Hancock. The art piece was installed in 2016 as a part of RTD's Art-n-Transit program and is located in the center of the station's bus bay. Biota contains LEDs which change color, representing the growth of a living organism.
