= EMU1200 series =

Former passenger train in Taiwan

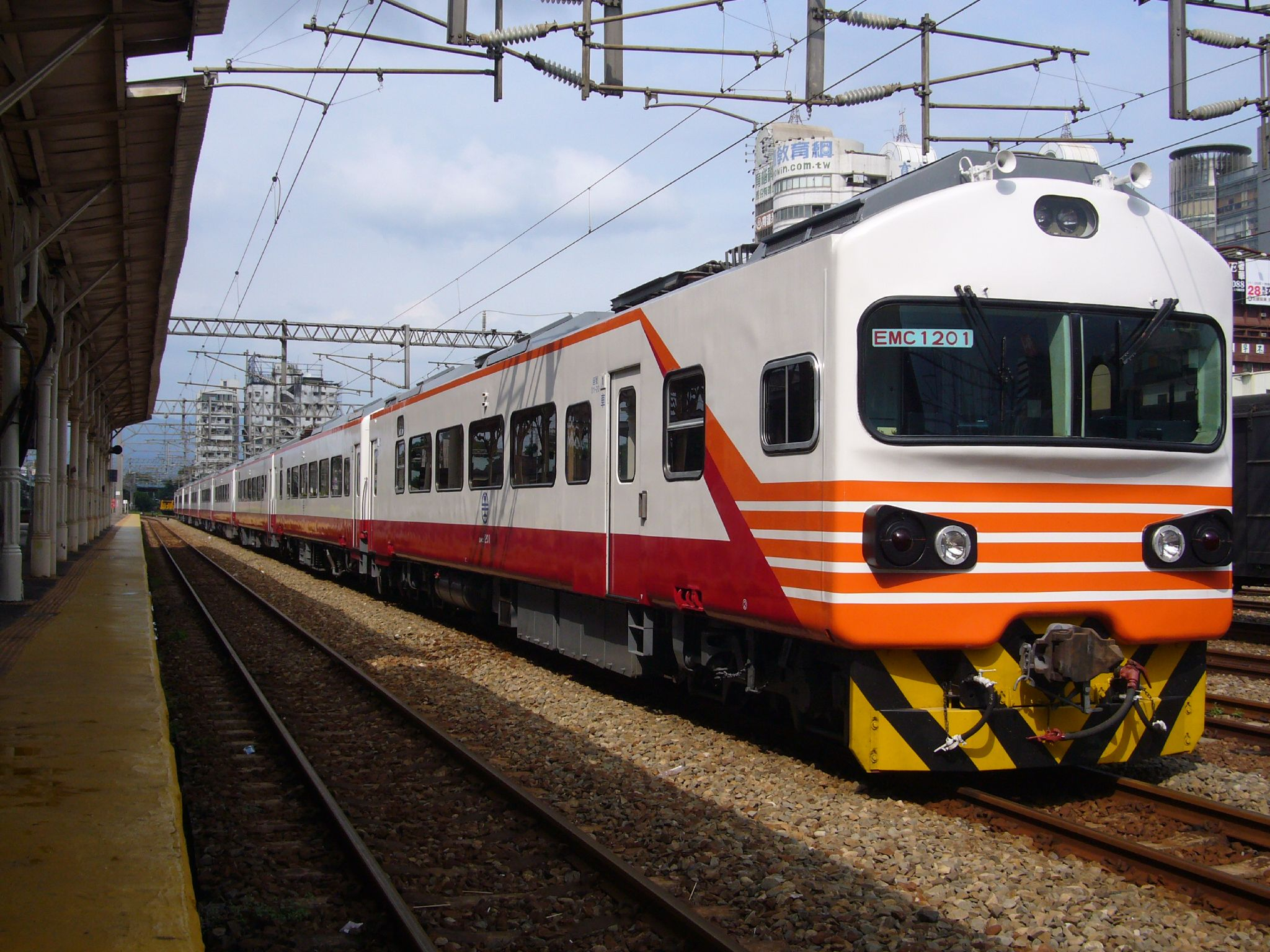
- An EMU1200 at Taichung Station
- In service: EMU200: 1987–2004; EMU1200: 2002–2022
- Manufacturer: EMU200: Union Carriage & Wagon; EMU1200: Taiwan Rolling Stock Company
- Constructed: 1986–1987
- Entered service: 1987
- Refurbished: 2002-2004
- Scrapped: 2022
- Number built: 33
- Number in service: 0
- Number preserved: 4
- Number scrapped: 29
- Formation: 3 cars per set/3 sets per train

Specifications
- Train length: 20 m (65 ft 7 in)
- Width: 2.88 m (9 ft 5 in)
- Height: 4.17 m (13 ft 8 in)
- Doors: 2 × 2 per car
- Maximum speed: 120 km/h (75 mph)
- Traction system: Thyristor–chopper control (GEC Traction)
- Traction motors: 24 × 125 kW (168 hp) G316BY DC motor (GEC Traction)
- Power output: 3 MW (4,000 hp)
- Tractive effort: 27,600 kN (6,200,000 lb_{f})
- Electric system(s): 25 kV 60 Hz AC (nominal) from overhead catenary
- Current collection: Pantograph
- Track gauge: 1,067 mm (3 ft 6 in)

The EMU1200 series is a series of electric multiple unit passenger trains operated by Taiwan Railway. The train was originally known as the EMU200 series until all of its cars were refurbished between 2002 and 2004. It is one of the trains that are used for the Tze-Chiang Limited Express.

== History ==
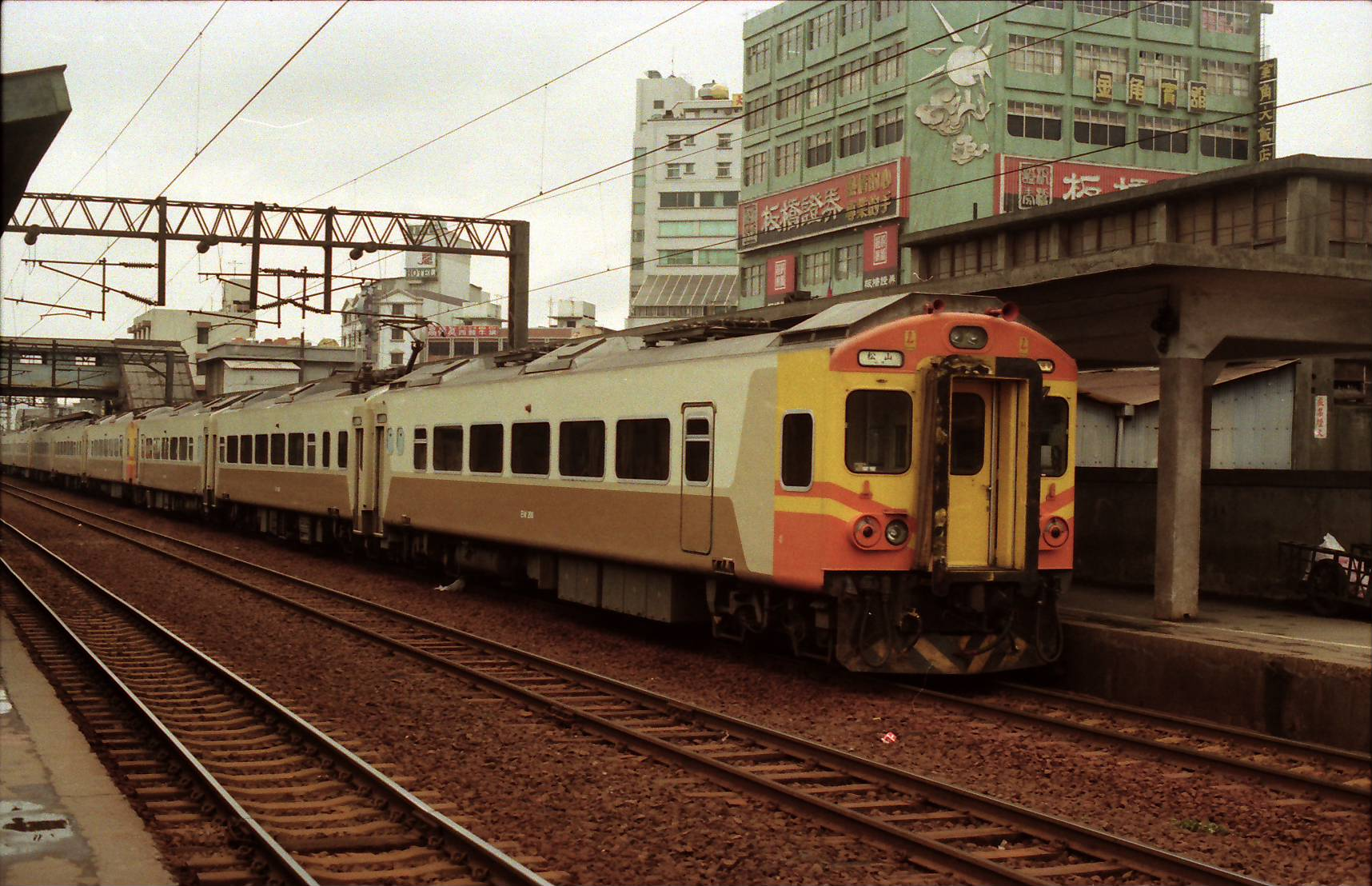
An EMU200 series train in Banqiao Station in 1989.

In 1978, the TRA introduced the Tze-Chiang class of trains with the EMU100 series running on newly-electrified tracks between Taipei and Taichung. This service proved to be extremely popular, prompting the TRA to purchase more trains to meet demand. In 1984, the TRA awarded Union Carriage & Wagon (UC&W) to build 33 railcars with three cars in each trainset, to be named as the EMU200 series. The trains were built between 1986 and 1987; notably, parts for the last three trainsets (numbered 209-211) were manufactured by UC&W and assembled in Taiwan by Tang Eng Iron Works. All cars entered service on 28 July 1987.

With the introduction of the E1000 series in 1996, the TRA saw the need to update the aging EMU200 series, which was plagued with reliability issues. The contract was given to Taiwan Rolling Stock Company (TRSC) and was done between 2002 and 2004. Then, the trains were given a new designation as the EMU1200 series. Despite the refurbishment, the train still proved to be unreliable. Plans to retire the train were disclosed in 2015. As of 2016, the train only runs twice a day by making a round trip between Changhua and Chaozhou, a section that is mostly flat to not cause excessive stress on the train. The train was retired on 28 March 2022, with its final journey departing from Fangliao to Changhua.

== Features ==
The EMU200 series ran in a three-car formation, with the motor cars on the two ends and a pantograph on the middle car. General Electric Company supplied the traction system. The EMU200 series' livery followed the same yellow and orange pattern on the EMU100 series. When the train was refurbished into the EMU1200 series, TRSC altered the trains to run in a nine-car formation along with automatic doors. The livery was also changed to a white and red pattern, giving it the nickname "red zebra".
