= Silverliner V =

Electric multiple unit railcar

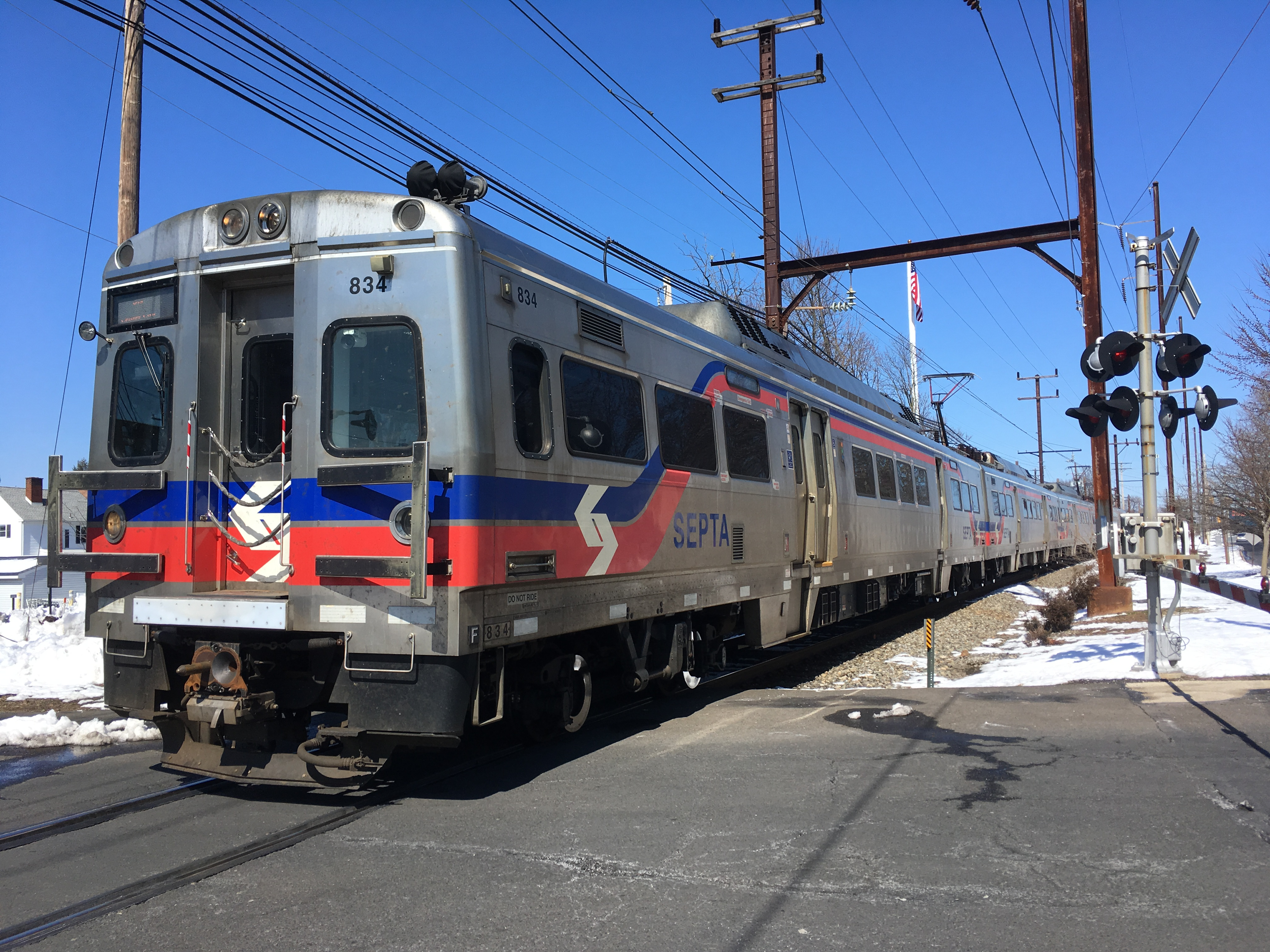
- SEPTA No. 834 on the Warminster Line approaching Hatboro station

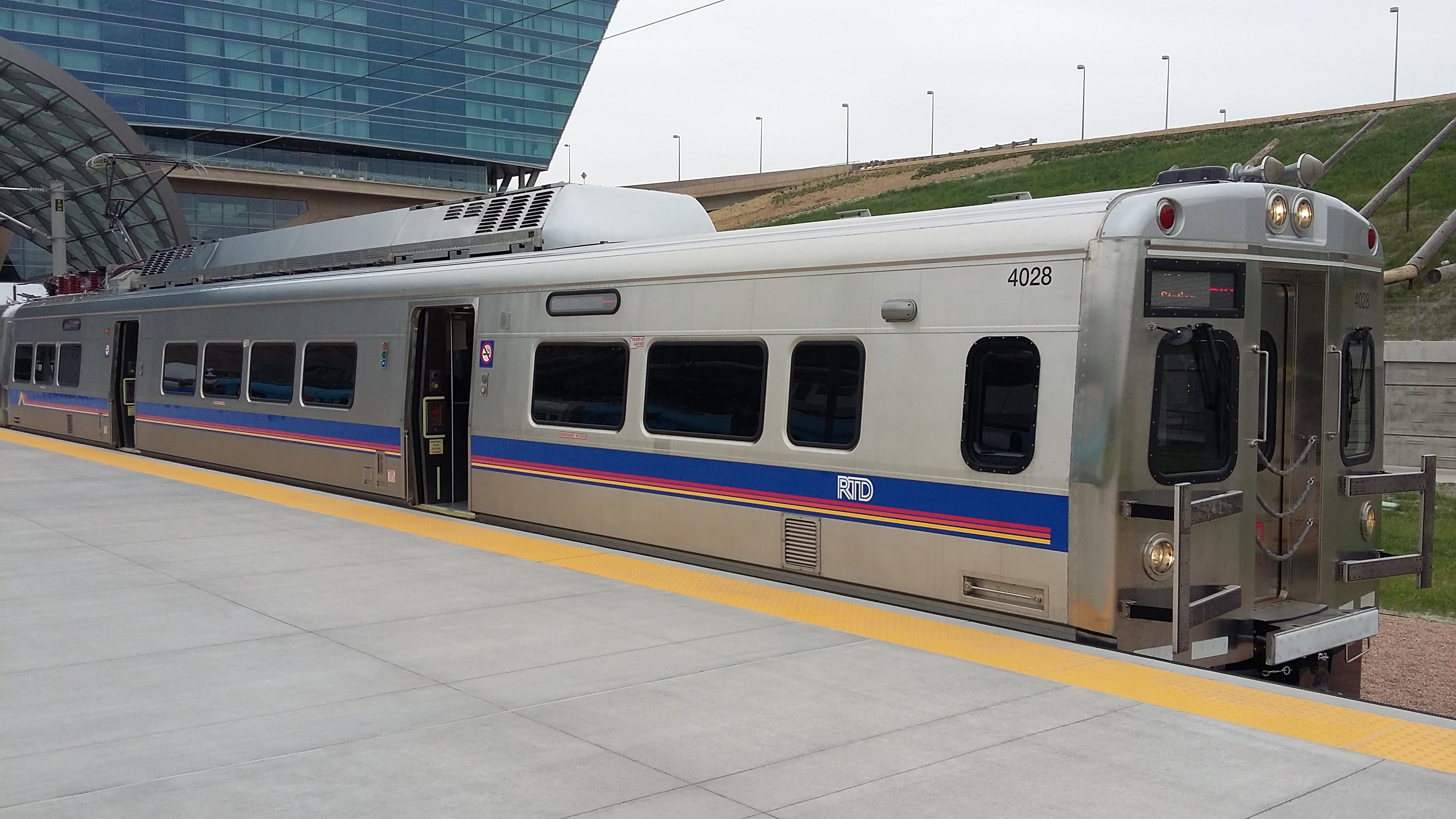
- RTD No. 4028 on the A Line at Denver Airport station.
- In service: SEPTA: 2010–present; RTD: 2016–present
- Manufacturer: Hyundai Rotem
- Built at: South Philadelphia, Pennsylvania
- Family name: Silverliner
- Replaced: 73 Silverliner II and Silverliner III's (SEPTA)
- Constructed: 2009–2016
- Number built: Total: 186; SEPTA: 120; RTD: 66
- Fleet numbers: SEPTA: 701–738, 801–882; RTD: 4001–4066
- Capacity: SEPTA: 107 (single car), 109 (married pair car); RTD: 91 per car
- Operators: SEPTA Regional Rail; Denver Regional Transportation District (RTD)

Specifications
- Car body construction: Stainless steel
- Car length: 85 ft 1.5 in (25,945 mm)
- Width: 10 ft 6 in (3,200 mm)
- Height: 14 ft 8 in (4,470 mm)
- Floor height: 4 ft 3 in (1.30 m)
- Doors: SEPTA: 3 per side, 2 with traps; RTD: 2 per side
- Maximum speed: Service: 110 mph (180 km/h) (SEPTA); 79 mph (130 km/h) (RTD); Design: 110 mph (180 km/h)
- Weight: 146,600 lb (66,500 kg)
- Traction system: Mitsubishi Electric IGBT–VVVF inverter SEPTA: MAP-204-A12VD185
- Traction motors: Mitsubishi Electric 3-phase AC induction motor SEPTA: MB-5127-A
- Acceleration: 3 mph/s (4.8 km/(h⋅s)) up to 30 mph (48 km/h)
- Deceleration: Minimum reduction: 0.4 mph/s (0.64 km/(h⋅s)) up to 50 mph (80 km/h); Suppression: 1.6 mph/s (2.6 km/(h⋅s)) up to 50 mph (80 km/h); Full service: 2.5 mph/s (4.0 km/(h⋅s)) up to 50 mph (80 km/h); Emergency: 3 mph/s (4.8 km/(h⋅s))
- Electric systems: Overhead line: 25 kV 60 Hz AC (RTD & SEPTA); 12 kV 25 Hz AC (SEPTA); 12.5 kV 60 Hz AC (SEPTA)
- Current collection: Pantograph
- UIC classification: Bo′Bo′
- AAR wheel arrangement: B-B
- Bogies: Bolsterless, GSI 70
- Braking systems: Pneumatic, one outboard disc, one tread per wheel Dynamic/Regenerative
- Coupling system: WABCO Model N-2
- Track gauge: 4 ft 8 1/2 in (1,435 mm) standard gauge

The Silverliner V is an electric multiple unit railcar designed and built by Hyundai Rotem. It is used by Philadelphia's SEPTA Regional Rail and Denver's Regional Transportation District. This is the fifth generation railcar in the Silverliner family of single level EMUs.

== SEPTA Regional Rail ==
The cars feature expanded interiors and windows, additional entrances and screens used to display information about the service. They are all ADA compliant and meet Federal Railroad Administration safety requirements. The cars were expected to arrive in 2005, but due to contract disputes, design delays, and a factory needing to be built in South Philadelphia, they did not arrive until 2010. SEPTA ordered a total of 120 cars at a cost of $274 million; the first cars arrived in the United States on February 28, 2010 (five years overdue) from South Korea, where they were manufactured by Hyundai Rotem. The cars were built in South Korea and the final assembly took place in South Philadelphia. The cars entered revenue service on October 29, 2010, and all 120 were to be completed by the end of 2011.

However, due to delays that were reported to last until mid-2012, SEPTA is owed millions in fines for the overdue equipment. SEPTA also closed off the very front row of seats due to safety concerns. The last of the 120 cars arrived on the property for testing in February 2013. Cars 735, 736, 871, and 872 are owned by the Delaware Transit Corporation. However, they are used systemwide for service and are not restricted to use on services to Delaware only. On July 2, 2016, SEPTA removed all 120 of its Silverliner V cars – a third of its fleet – from service due to fatigue cracks in the trucks, leading to reduced service system-wide. The agency received some of the trains back in September 2016; but subsequently withdrew 18 cars after an additional defect was identified – a “clearance issue” that led to occasional contact between old and new components. SEPTA announced that it could resume normal schedules on October 3 and would receive all trains by November 2016.

== RTD Commuter Rail ==
In 2010, Denver's Regional Transportation District selected the Silverliner V (RTD now refers to them as EMU V) for its new commuter rail line. A total of 66 cars were purchased in the married pair configuration for a total of $300 million. The first four cars were delivered to Denver on December 3, 2014, with service to start in 2016. As of 2020, Silverliner V trains were used on the RTD's A, B, G and N lines.

Differences between the RTD and SEPTA cars include support for only 25 kV 60 Hz AC electrification, two center-opening high-level doors per side, less powerful traction motors, full-width cabs, and e-bells.

== Electromagnetic interference ==
Some users of audio equipment have found that the presence of tracks carrying Silverliner V cars has introduced detrimental electromagnetic interference to the playback and recording of audio. This phenomenon also affects audio and PA electronics inside the cars, although Hyundai Rotem has fitted filters to lessen the effect on internal equipment.
