= EMU800 series =

Passenger train in Taiwan

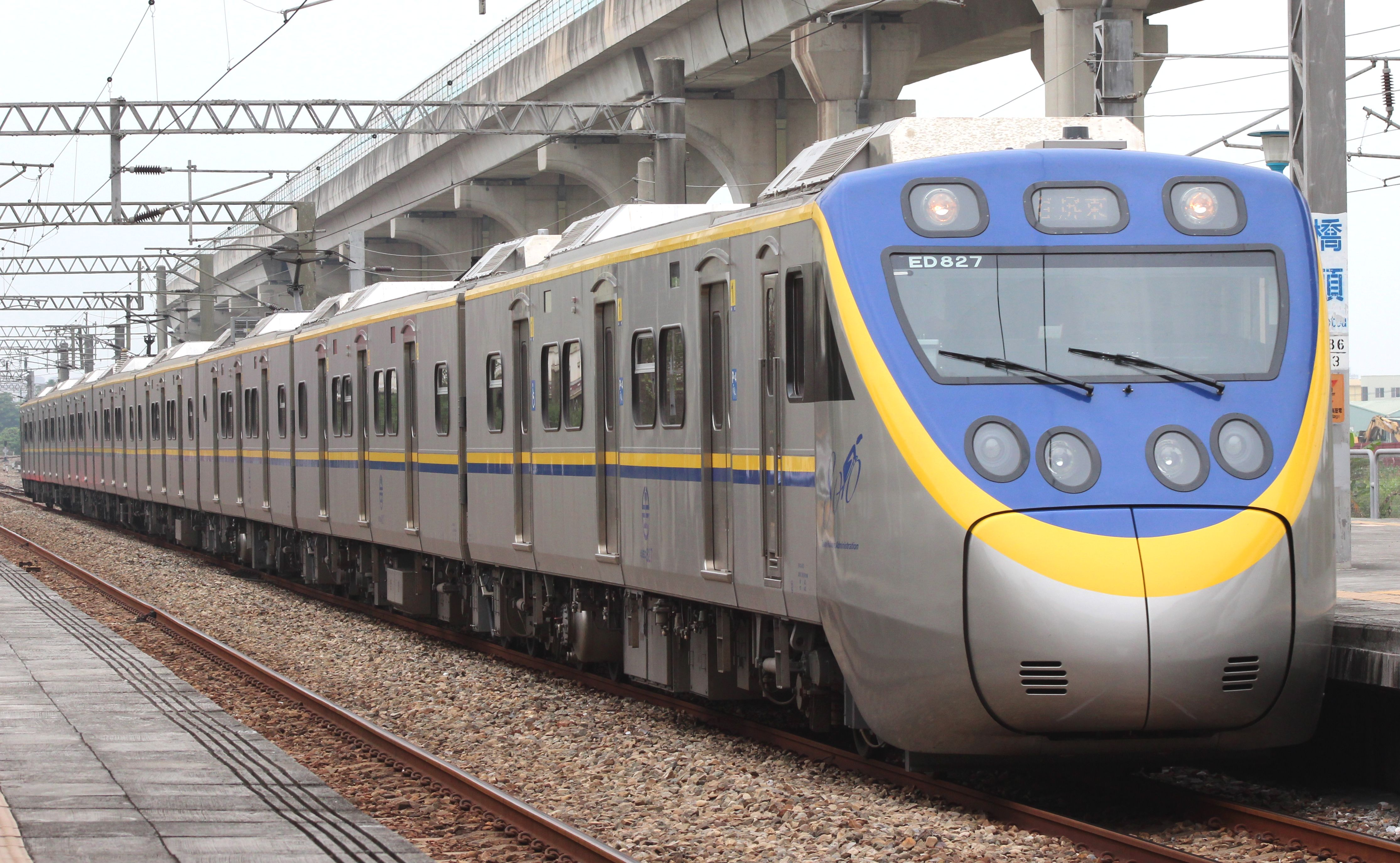
- EMU827/828 at Ciaotou in May 2014

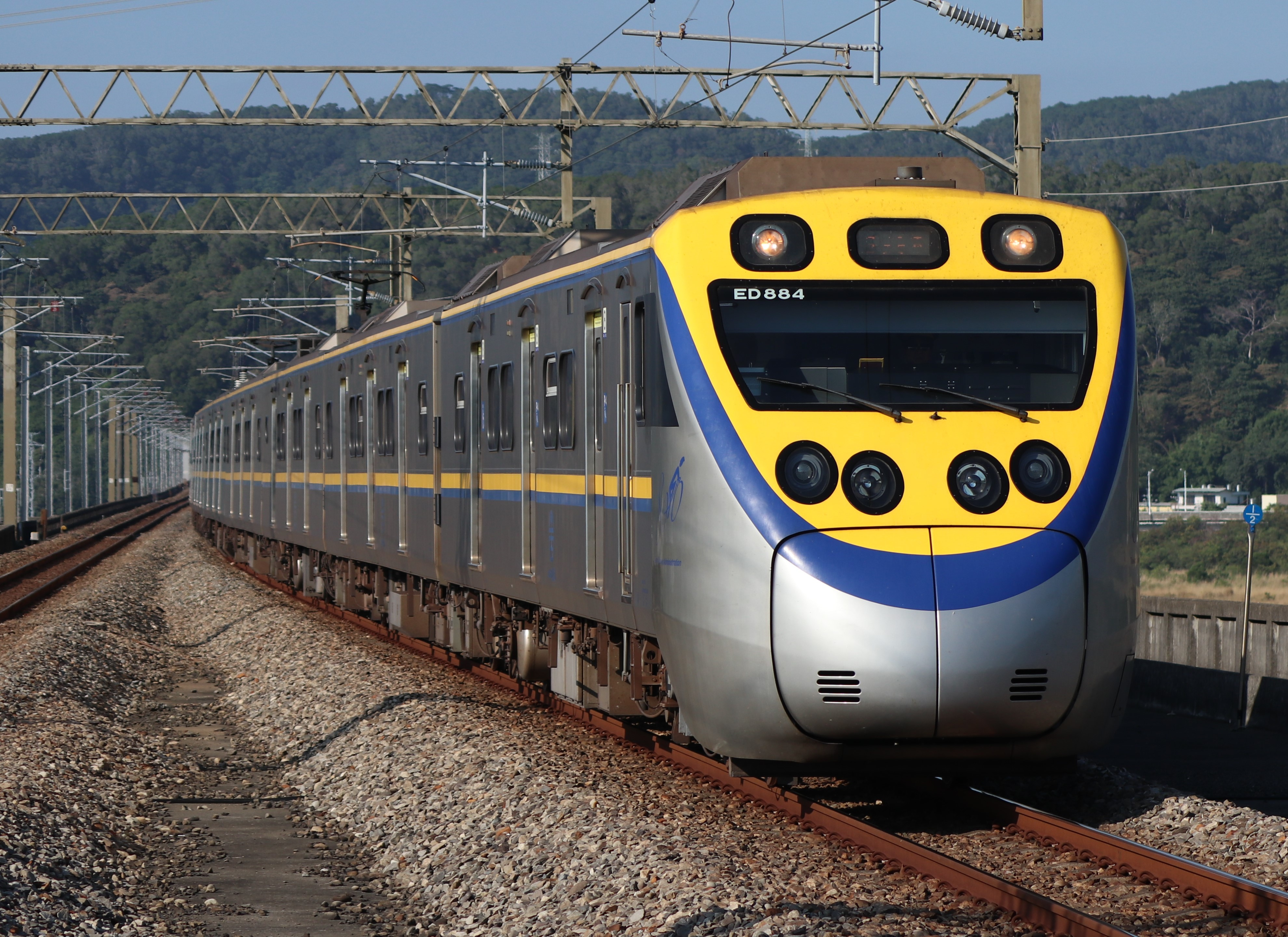
- EMU883/884. The second batch EMU800 series are painted with inverted colors from the first batch (above).
- In service: 2014–present
- Manufacturers: Nippon Sharyo (EMU801–EMU804); TRSC (EMU805–EMU874, EMU881–EMU892)
- Built at: Toyokawa, Aichi, Japan (EMU801–EMU804); Hsinchu, Taiwan (EMU805–EMU874, EMU881–EMU892)
- Constructed: 2013–2016
- Entered service: 2 January 2014
- Number built: 344 vehicles (43 sets)
- Number in service: 344 vehicles (43 sets)
- Formation: 8 cars per trainset
- Fleet numbers: EMU801–EMU874, EMU881–EMU892
- Operator: Taiwan Railway Corporation

Specifications
- Car body construction: Stainless steel
- Train length: 165 m (541 ft 4 1/16 in)
- Car length: 21.6 m (70 ft 10 3/8 in) (ED); 20.3 m (66 ft 7 3/16 in) (others)
- Width: 2.89 m (9 ft 5 3/4 in)
- Height: 4,227 mm (13 ft 10 7/16 in) (EP); 3,958 mm (12 ft 11 13/16 in) (others)
- Doors: 3 pairs per side
- Wheel diameter: 860–780 mm (34–31 in) (new–worn)
- Wheelbase: 2.3 m (7 ft 7 in)
- Maximum speed: 140 km/h (87 mph) (design); 130 km/h (81 mph) (service)
- Weight: 319.98 t (314.93 long tons; 352.72 short tons)
- Traction system: Toshiba COV098-A0 IGBT–C/I
- Traction motors: 16 × Toshiba SEA-431 220 kW (300 hp) asynchronous 3-phase AC
- Power output: 3.52 MW (4,720 hp)
- Acceleration: 0.7 m/s^{2} (2.3 ft/s^{2}) (0–50 km/h (0–31 mph)); 0.4 m/s^{2} (1.3 ft/s^{2}) (50–110 km/h (31–68 mph)); 0.2 m/s^{2} (0.66 ft/s^{2}) (110–130 km/h (68–81 mph))
- Deceleration: 1.2 m/s^{2} (3.9 ft/s^{2}) (service); 1.3 m/s^{2} (4.3 ft/s^{2}) (emergency)
- Electric system: 25 kV 60 Hz AC (nominal) from overhead catenary
- Current collection: Pantograph
- UIC classification: 2′2′+Bo′Bo′+2′2′+Bo′Bo′+Bo′Bo′+2′2′+Bo′Bo′+2′2′
- Bogies: ND-741
- Track gauge: 1,067 mm (3 ft 6 in)

Notes/references
- Sourced from except where noted

The EMU800 is a series of electric multiple unit train used by the Taiwan Railway Corporation. The then Taiwan Railways Administration (TRA) purchased a total of 344 cars (i.e. 43 sets) of the series.

== History ==
The EMU800 series was purchased in response to increasing passenger volume and electrification of branch lines, which diverted older commuter EMUs. At 296 cars, the order is the second-largest ever placed by the then TRA. The first two EMU800 trains were built by Nippon Sharyo, and the remaining 35 were built by the Taiwan Rolling Stock Company from 2013 to 2015. At the beginning there was a dispute over the braking system. After years of negotiation, TRA accepted the proposal and the EMU800 began to service.

In 2016, the TRA purchased six additional trains. The colors on these trains are inverted, earning the nickname "minion train" (小小兵號).

== Design and features ==
Unlike previous commuter EMUs, the EMU800 features a fully streamlined nose. Its yellow-and-blue paint scheme has earned it the nickname "smiling train" (微笑號) due to the way the stripe is painted on. The trainsets also have the same top speed as Taiwan's intercity non-HSR trains in operational use at 130 km/h (81 mph), compared to 110 km/h (68 mph) for all other commuter stock.

The EMU800 is also the first to have bicycle racks, installed in each of the end cars. Another feature new to the 800 is displays inside the cabin to broadcast messages. The EMU800 is meant to displace older locomotive-hauled trains and the older EMU500 on main line services.

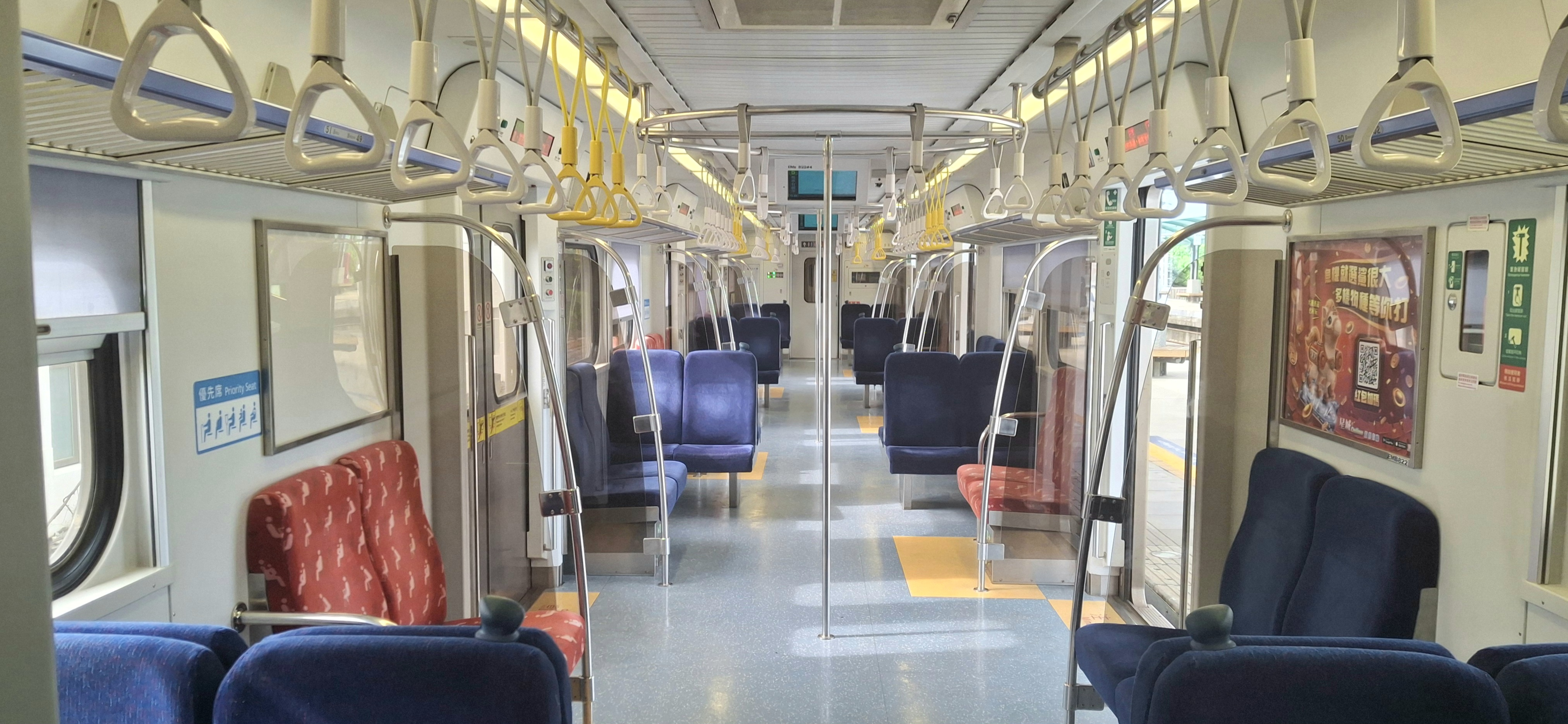
Train Interior

== Service ==
EMU800s were introduced into service starting from January 2, 2014. Most trainsets are based out of either Hsinchu or Chiayi on services in the greater Taipei and Kaoshiung areas.

== See also ==
- EMU700 series
- Media related to TRA EMU800 at Wikimedia Commons
