= Eagle P3 =

Public–private partnership operating trains in Denver

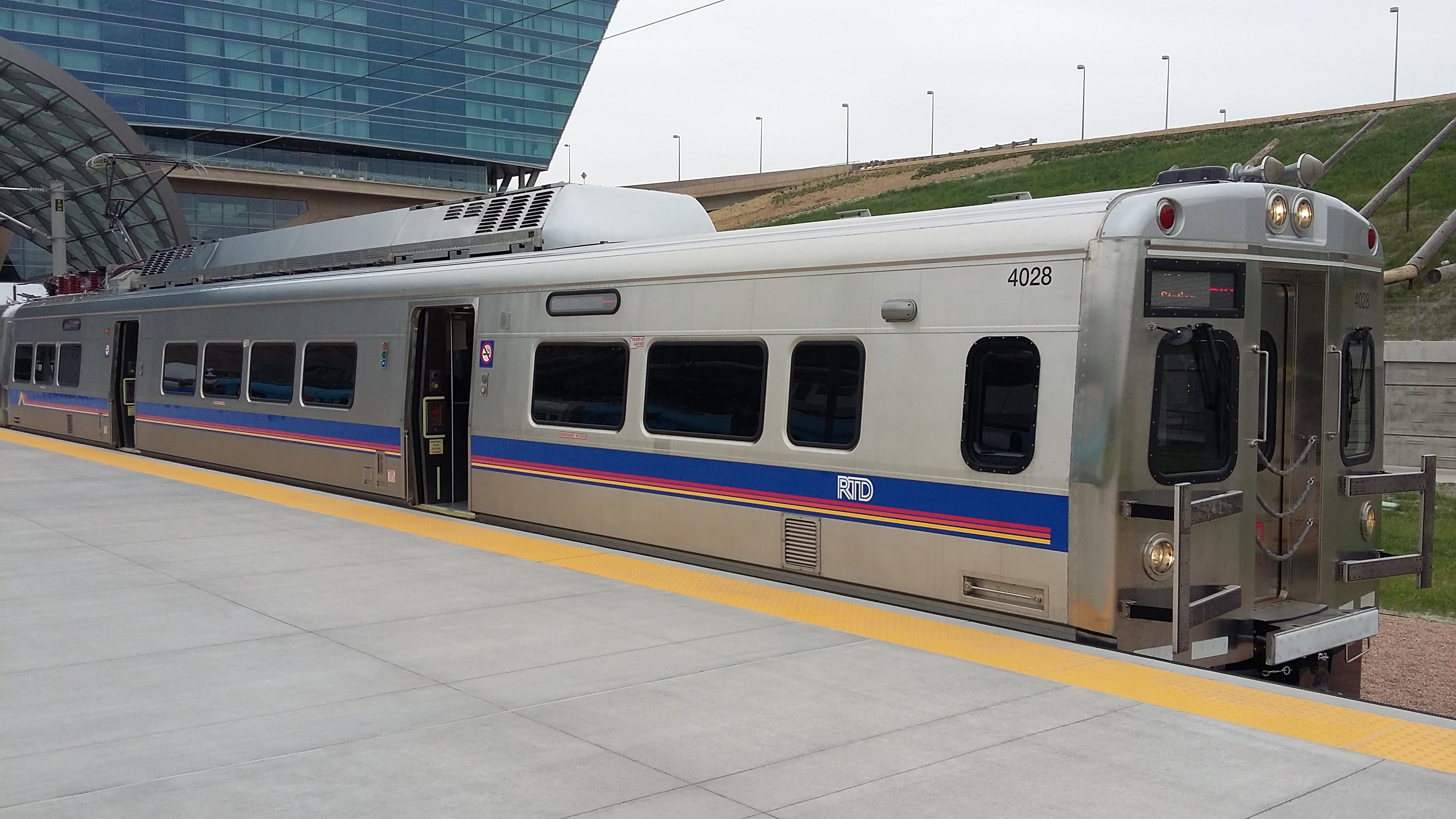
A Line train, built and operated by Denver Transit Partners, as part of the Eagle P3 agreement, at Denver Airport station on opening day of the A Line

Eagle P3 is a public–private partnership (P3) involving the Regional Transportation District (RTD) of Denver, Colorado and Denver Transit Partners, a partnership of several private companies. Under the Eagle P3 signed in 2010, Denver Transit Partners holds a 34-year contract (until 2044) to design, build, finance, operate and maintain RTD commuter rail lines (the A Line, B Line and G Line).

Eagle P3 is part of the RTD FasTracks public transportation expansion plan and voter-approved sales tax increase for the Greater Metropolitan Denver area in Colorado.

== Terms ==
Under the terms of Eagle P3, a private company is responsible for designing, building, securing financing, operating and maintaining (DBFOM) three commuter rail lines, the East Corridor (later named the A Line), the Gold Line (later named the G Line), and a 5.2-mile (8.4 km) "starter segment" of the Northwest Corridor (later named the B Line).

Additionally, the private company would build a maintenance facility for commuter rail equipment that could be used on the lines operated by the contractor, as well as lines directly operated by the RTD.

The contract stipulates that the RTD owns all assets involved and collects all revenues generated, while the private contractor assumes all risks involved in the project's operation. In return, the RTD will make monthly payments to the contractor.

Eagle P3 is the second full transit DBFOM public-private partnership in the United States. The first full transit DBFOM public-private partnership in the United States was the Tren Urbano in San Juan, Puerto Rico.

The involvement of a private sector company was estimated to save about $300 million in construction costs compared to estimates of the cost if the RTD were solely responsible for the project.

== Private partner selection ==
The process of selecting the private sector company for Eagle P3 began in August 2008, when the RTD issued a request for qualifications, to which three companies responded. In September 2009, a request for proposal was sent to each company; the RTD received two technical proposals in April 2010, followed by two final proposals in May.

Out of these, the RTD in June awarded the contract to Denver Transit Partners, a consortium led by engineering firm Fluor Corporation and the Macquarie Group investment bank, with Uberior Infrastructure Investments and infrastructure designer, builder, and maintenance company Balfour Beatty as the other major partners. Macquarie Group subsequently sold its stake in the project to John Laing and Uberior at the financial closing of the contract.

Minority partners (subcontractors) include transit operating company Alternate Concepts, Ames Construction, design firm HDR, train builder Hyundai Rotem, rail consultant Interfleet Technology, engineering firm Parsons Brinckerhoff, construction engineering firm PBS&J, rail engineering consultant Systra and rail safety system developer Wabtec.

Under the final terms of the contract, RTD will pay Denver Transit Partners, a total of $7.1 billion over the length of the contract.

== Finances ==
The project is expected to cost about $2.1 billion, with funding coming largely from three sources: federal, private partner investment, and local.

A federal grant of $1.03 billion was announced for the project on August 31, 2011, followed by an award of a federal loan of $280 million on December 2, 2011.

Denver Transit Partners will contribute $450 million, $396 from Private Activity Bonds and $54 million in cash.

The remainder will be covered by local funds. The primary source will be RTD issued bonds, to repaid with sales tax revenues collected by the voter-approved FasTracks plan. Additionally, some funding will come from local government matches.

== Construction ==
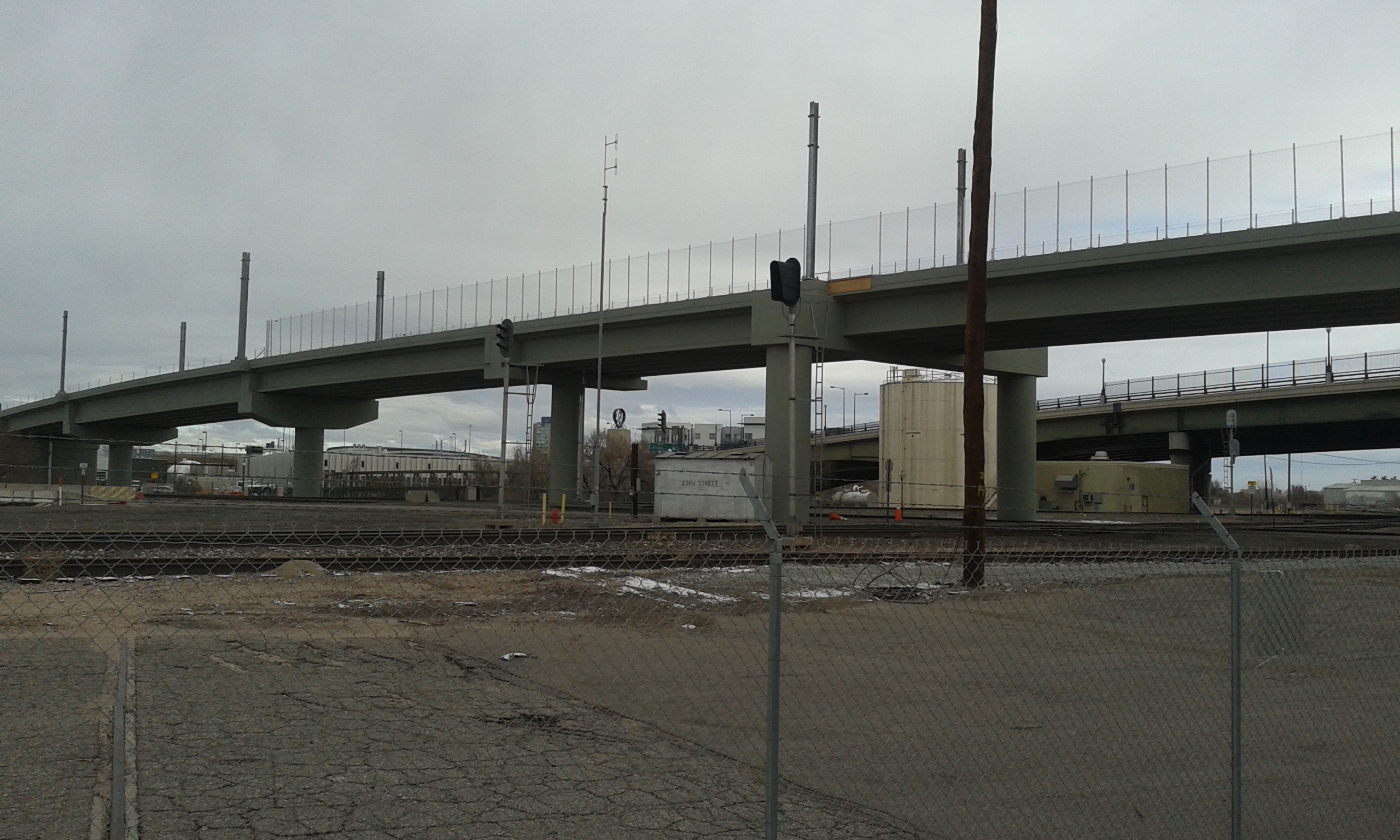
Bridge built by Denver Transit Partners that carries the B and G lines over freight lines and South Platte River

Eagle P3 was completed in two phases. Phase One includes the construction of the East Corridor, the maintenance facility, and the section of the Northwest Corridor that leads to the maintenance facility. Also undertaken during this phase is the design work for the Gold Line and the remaining part of the Northwest Corridor starter line, the purchase of rolling stock and the electrification of trackage in Denver Union Station.

The second phase of the project was the construction of the Gold Line and Northwest Corridor that were designed during Phase One.

On October 21, 2011, Wabtec signed a $63 million contract with Denver Transit Partners to construct the positive train control system for the Eagle P3 commuter rail lines. The contract included installation of the signaling and communications systems, a dispatch center and other management services.

Construction on Phase 1 began in August 2010, and the East Corridor (then renamed the A Line) opened on April 22, 2016.

The groundbreaking for the Gold Line (the start of Phase 2) took place in August 2011. The initial segment of the Northwest Corridor (then renamed the B Line) opened on July 25, 2016, followed by the Gold Line (then renamed the G Line) on April 26, 2019.

== Operation ==
Denver Transit Partners contracts with another consortium of private companies, Denver Transit Operators, to operate and maintain the commuter rail lines. Denver Transit Operators is led by transit operating company Alternate Concepts, with Balfour Beatty and Fluor as the other partners.

Denver Transit Operators runs the A, B, and G Lines, along with the maintenance facility.

The RTD directly operates the N Line, but uses the same equipment maintained by Denver Transit Operators.
