= Taiwan Rolling Stock Company =

Rolling stock manufacturer

Taiwan Rolling Stock Co., Ltd.
- Industry: Rail Transportation
- Founded: October 16, 2002
- Headquarters: Hukou, Hsinchu County,(Taiwan)
- Key people: Chairman: M.K. Huang; President: C.S. Hsu
- Products: Rail vehicles
- Number of employees: 255
- Website: http://www.trsc.com.tw/

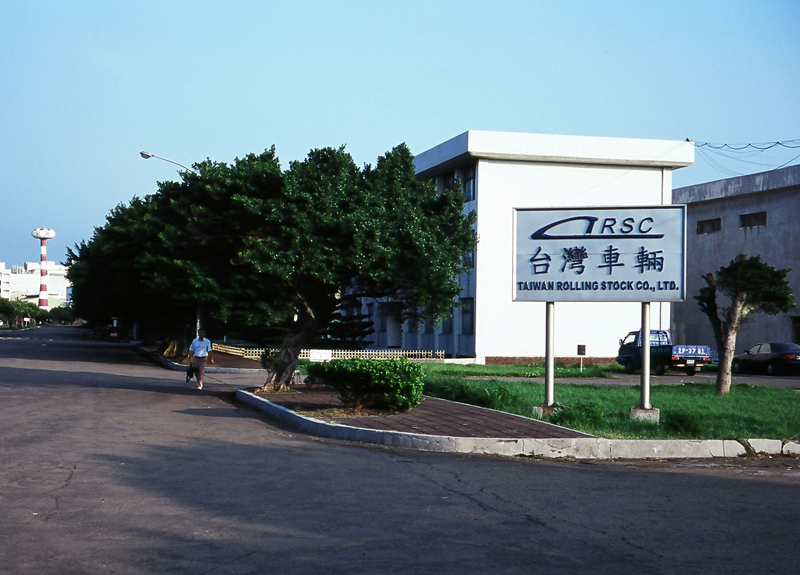
TRSC factory in Hsinchu County

Taiwan Rolling Stock Company (TRSC) is a rail vehicle company. TRSC is located in Hukou, Hsinchu County, near Xinfeng railway station. It was previously a rolling stock production division of Tang Eng Iron Works before 2002. After privatization, the company received several orders from Taiwan Railways Administration and also Kawasaki Heavy Industries. For example, some vehicles (type C371, C381) of the Taipei Metro system were built by TRSC.

TRSC cooperated with Nippon Sharyo in several products, such as DHL100, Alishan Forest locomotive, EMU700, EMU800.

There was a dispute regarding the EMU800 at its beginning stage. The brake system differed from specifications because the supplier made a mistake on the type of brake system. After the dispute was solved, the TRSC started to deliver EMU800 trains to the Taiwan Railways Administration. On 29 May 2015, the TRSC delivered the 37th train to TRA, which marks a milestone of Taiwanese rail-vehicle industry. Furthermore, the TRSC is anticipated to be the future of manufacturing industry.

In recent years, TRSC cooperated with Voith Engineering Services for the Danhai Light Rail Transit system. On 26 August 2015, TRSC got additional order of EMU800. The total number of this order is 48 cars.

TRSC is now owned by China Steel Corporation since 2015. TRSC's products range from locomotives, cabs, EMUs, trams and it receives more and more orders from customers. It is one of the only companies that can design, manufacture and maintain rolling stock in Taiwan (some freight wagons are built and maintained by another company in DaHu near LuZhu in the North of Kaohsiung).

== Products ==
- Taiwan Railways EMU1200
- Alishan Forest Locomotive 7th generation
- DHL100
- Taiwan Railways EMU700 (with Nippon Sharyo)
- Taipei Metro C371 (with Kawasaki)
- Taipei Metro C381 (with Kawasaki)
- Taoyuan Airport MRT commuter EMU (with Kawasaki)
- Taiwan Railways EMU800 (with Nippon Sharyo)
- Danhai LRV

== See also ==
- List of companies of Taiwan
