= EMU700 series =

Passenger train in Taiwan

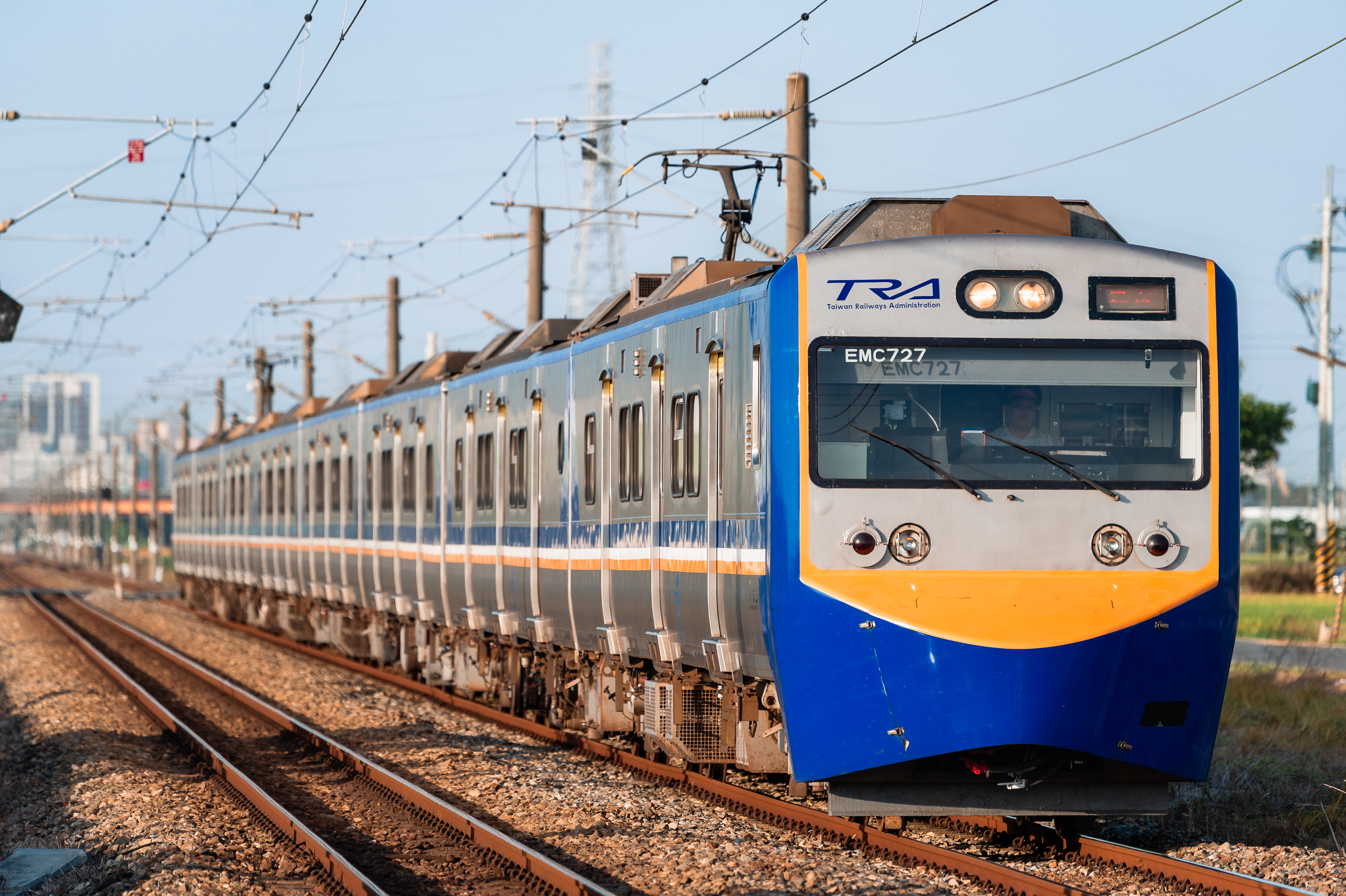
- EMU727/728 near Shigui, November 2023

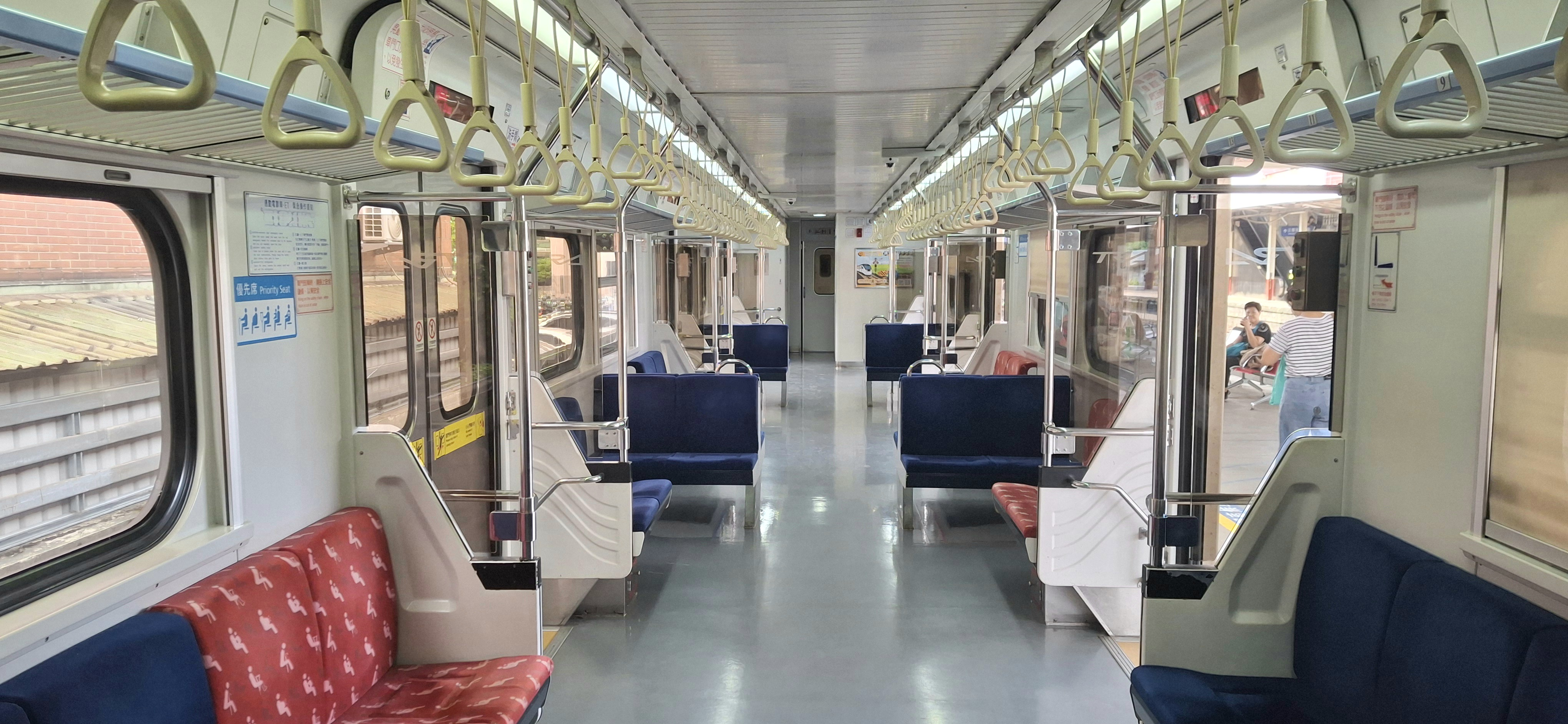
- Train Interior
- In service: 2007–present
- Manufacturers: Nippon Sharyo (EMU701–EMU703); TRSC (EMU704–EMU740)
- Built at: Toyokawa, Aichi, Japan (EMU701–EMU703); Hsinchu, Taiwan (EMU704–EMU740)
- Constructed: 2007–2008
- Entered service: 20 November 2007
- Number built: 160 vehicles (20 sets)
- Number in service: 160 vehicles (20 sets)
- Formation: 8 cars per trainset
- Fleet numbers: EMU701–EMU740
- Operator: Taiwan Railway Corporation

Specifications
- Car body construction: Stainless steel
- Train length: 163,286 mm (535 ft 8 9/16 in)
- Car length: 20,743 mm (68 ft 5/8 in) (EMC); 20.3 m (66 ft 7 3/16 in) (others)
- Width: 2.89 m (9 ft 5 3/4 in)
- Height: 4,225 mm (13 ft 10 5/16 in) (EP); 3,956 mm (12 ft 11 3/4 in) (others)
- Doors: 3 pairs per side
- Wheel diameter: 860–780 mm (34–31 in) (new–worn)
- Maximum speed: 120 km/h (75 mph) (design); 110 km/h (68 mph) (service)
- Weight: 313.5 t (308.5 long tons; 345.6 short tons)
- Traction system: Toshiba COV075-A0 IGBT–C/I
- Traction motors: 16 × Toshiba SEA-416 240 kW (320 hp) asynchronous 3-phase AC
- Power output: 3.84 MW (5,150 hp)
- Acceleration: 0.7 m/s^{2} (2.3 ft/s^{2}) (0–50 km/h (0–31 mph)); 0.4 m/s^{2} (1.3 ft/s^{2}) (0–100 km/h (0–62 mph))
- Deceleration: 0.8 m/s^{2} (2.6 ft/s^{2}) (service); 1 m/s^{2} (3.3 ft/s^{2}) (emergency)
- Electric system: 25 kV 60 Hz AC (nominal) from overhead catenary
- Current collection: Pantograph
- UIC classification: Bo′Bo′+2′2′+2′2′+Bo′Bo′+Bo′Bo′+2′2′+2′2′+Bo′Bo′
- Bogies: ND-737, ND-737T
- Braking systems: Regenerative and pneumatic
- Safety system: ATP (ERTMS/ETCS Level 1)
- Track gauge: 1,067 mm (3 ft 6 in)

Notes/references
- Sourced from except where noted

The EMU700 is a series of electric multiple unit train used by the Taiwan Railway Corporation. The then Taiwan Railways Administration (TRA) purchased 160 cars of the series. It was constructed by Nippon Sharyo and Taiwan Rolling Stock Company and began operations on 20 November 2007.

The EMU700 adopts current rules of Taiwan Railway Administration known as RAMS: Reliability; Availability; Maintainability; System Safety. This train series operates as "Local Train" and "Local Express", using the pricing of NT$1.46 per km and person fare system identical to the Fuhsing Semi Express. Sometimes during the holidays it operates as "non-reserved " through train.

The EMU700 is nicknamed the "Suneo train" (阿福號) due to the resemblance of its front cab design with that of the character Suneo Honekawa from the Japanese manga and anime series Doraemon. A lunchbox counter designed in the style of the EMU700 front cab also exists at Platform 2 of Shulin Station in New Taipei City, Taiwan since July 2009.

== Design ==
The EMU700 has distinctive hinged nose cone unlike its predecessors in the EMU line with smooth fronts.

On May 12, 2016, the livery of sets 701 and 702 was changed to the vermillion red with white stripe Keikyu livery similar to those found on the Keikyu 800 series trains.

== Features ==
Its interior features informational LEDs, similar to the cars of the Taipei Metro. It has an onboard broadcasting system that is able to play a note sound upon arrival to a station and when the doors open and close. It also contains a lighting system, an emergency call device, and a cabin that are improved from its predecessors. The maximum speed of the EMU700 is 110 km/h (68 mph).

== Derivative ==
The new EMU800 train sets were developed from the EMU700 to replace the ageing EMU400 trains and supplement the existing fleet of TRA's local class trains.

== See also ==
- EMU800 series
- Media related to TRA EMU700 at Wikimedia Commons
