= Denver Airport station =

Commuter rail station in Denver, Colorado

Denver Airport
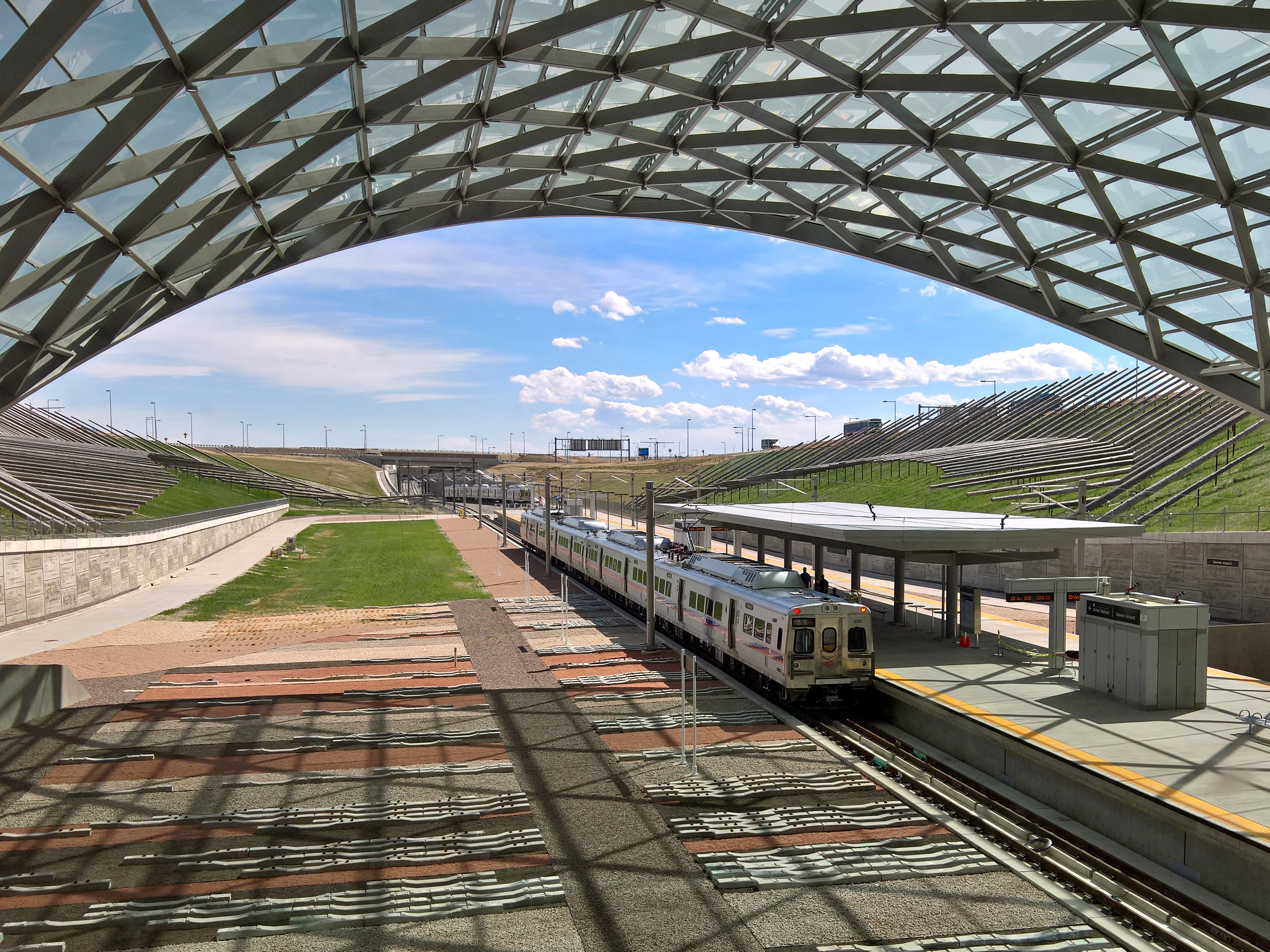
- Denver Airport station as seen from the Westin hotel

General information
- Location: 26800 East 84th Avenue; Denver, Colorado
- Coordinates: 39°50′46″N 104°40′26″W
- Owner: Regional Transportation District
- Line: East Corridor
- Platforms: 1 island platform
- Tracks: 2
- Connections: RTD Bus: 104L, 145X, 169L, AB1, AB2, AB3, AT, ATA; Bustang Outrider: Sterling–Denver

Construction
- Structure type: Below grade
- Parking: Paid parking nearby

Other information
- Fare zone: Airport

History
- Opened: April 22, 2016

Passengers
- 2025: 11,744 (average daily)
- Rank: 2 out of 75

Services
Preceding station	RTD	Following station
61st & Peña toward Union Station	A Line	Terminus
Location

Denver Airport is a commuter rail station on the A Line in Denver, Colorado, serving Denver International Airport. It is the eastern terminus of the A Line, which travels from this station to Union Station in downtown Denver. The station opened along with the rest of the A Line on April 22, 2016.

Trains depart this station every 15 minutes during the day, and every 30 minutes before 6:00 AM and after 8:00 PM. The trip to Union Station takes approximately 40 minutes.

== History ==
The 1989 master plan for Denver International Airport included provisions for a future transit connection, and the Jeppesen Terminal was designed to accommodate it. The Regional Transportation District (RTD) first studied a rail link in 1997, but funding became available only after voters approved the FasTracks expansion package in November 2004. The 23.5-mile (37.8 km) line was built and is operated through Eagle P3, a public-private partnership.

The station was designed by architecture firm Gensler, which also designed the Westin hotel built above and straddling the tracks. The hotel opened on November 25, 2015, several months before the station, and the project also included an 82,000 square feet (7,600 m^{2}) open-air plaza. The complex achieved a LEED Platinum rating.

== Station layout ==
Level 6
Jeppesen Terminal - passenger drop-off, check-in, airport security
Level 5
Jeppesen Terminal - baggage claim, ground transportation, escalators to platform level
Level 4
Jeppesen Terminal - passenger pick-up; Westin hotel
Level 3
Westin hotel (no access from platform level)
Level 2
Westin hotel (no access from platform level)
Level 1

Platform Level

Bus bays and United/Southwest kiosks, north end of platform →
Westbound
← toward Union Station (61st & Peña)
Island platform, doors will open on the left or right
Westbound
← toward Union Station (61st & Peña)
Escalators to Jeppesen Terminal Level 5, north end of platform →

Denver Airport station has a two-track island platform for terminating A Line trains, as well as several bus gates. The bus gates are used by RTD's airport express buses. These include the AB1/AB2/AB3 to Boulder and the AT/ATA to Nine Mile and Arapahoe at Village Center stations in Denver's southeastern suburbs. Additional RTD bus routes at the station include limited-stop hourly services to Thornton, Brighton, and Longmont. The station is also served by the Bustang Outrider service to Sterling. The tracks and island platform are offset within the station's right-of-way to allow for future expansion.

The platform and bus bays are located on Level 1 of the Jeppesen Terminal. A five-story escalator bank, the tallest in Colorado, connects the north end of the platform directly to Level 5. Level 5 contains the airport's baggage claim carousels and ground transportation facilities, and arriving passengers can proceed straight from baggage claim to the platform. Departing passengers must use another escalator in the terminal to reach check-in counters and airport security checkpoints on Level 6. The station has several unique amenities given its location. An RTD service desk is located adjacent to the platform, where agents can answer questions and acquaint arriving passengers with the RTD system. The station includes numerous flight information screens. Lastly, departing passengers travelling on United Airlines and Southwest Airlines have access to airport check-in kiosks and baggage services at platform level, and can drop off their checked baggage before ascending the escalators to the terminal.

Denver Airport station is the only RTD rail station located in the Airport fare zone. The fare to or from the airport is $10, and tapping on or off at this station awards a day pass to the entire RTD bus and rail network.

== Public art ==
The station includes several public art installations:

- Shadow Array, by Denver artist Patrick Marold, is an outdoor sculpture composed of 236 beetle-killed spruce logs arranged to create shifting shadows and patterns in natural and artificial light.
- L’eau dans tous ses états (lit. 'Water in all of its states'), by Paris-based light artist Yann Kersalé, is a slow-moving video projection above the escalator connecting the station to the terminal.
- An informal landscaping feature east of the platform incorporates dozens of surplus concrete railroad ties from construction, arranged decoratively in an area reserved for future expansion.
