= Peña Boulevard =

Freeway in Colorado, United States

- Peña Boulevard highlighted in red
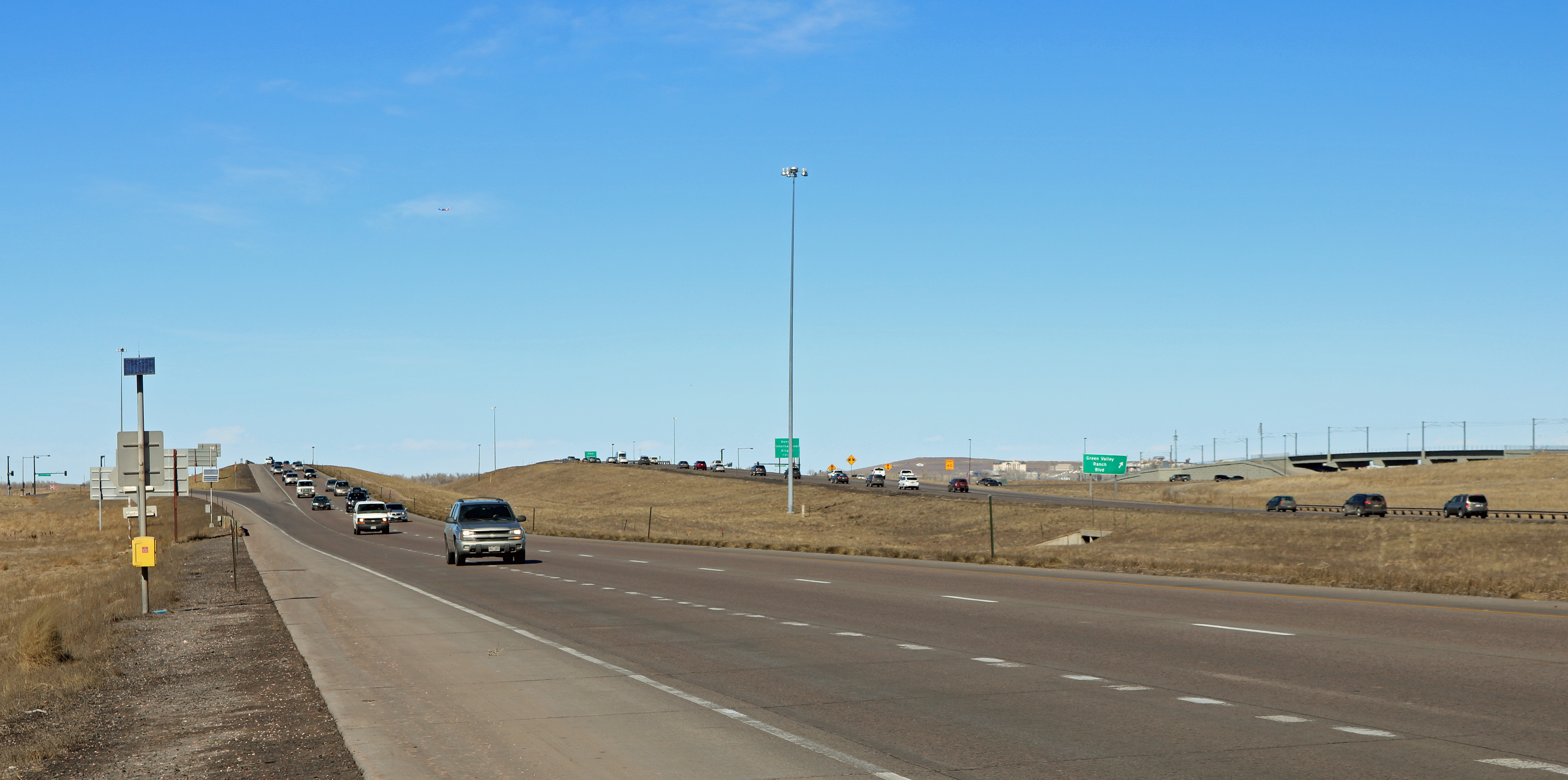
- Looking north from just south of Green Valley Ranch Boulevard

Route information
- Maintained by City and County of Denver
- Length: 11.1 mi (17.9 km)
- Existed: 1993–present

Major junctions
- West end: I-70 in Aurora
- E-470 in Denver
- East end: Denver International Airport

Peña Boulevard, named for former Denver mayor Federico Peña, is an 11.1-mile-long (17.9 km) freeway located in Adams County and the City and County of Denver, Colorado. The freeway, which opened in 1993, provides the primary vehicular access into Denver International Airport, which opened at the same time. Peña Boulevard begins as an extension of Airport Boulevard in Aurora at an interchange with Interstate 70 (I-70) and travels north, then east to end at the airport, with an intermediate interchange with the E-470 tollway.

== Route description ==
Peña Boulevard begins at an interchange with I-70 in Aurora as a northern continuation of Airport Boulevard. The first freeway interchange is at East 40th Avenue, which also provides traffic access to and from Aurora's Airport Boulevard running to the south. Travelers leaving the airport use this exit for access to eastbound I-70 through the adjacent Airport Boulevard/I-70 interchange. Travelers inbound to the airport from I-70 East do not have access to the first interchange. Continuing north, the freeway leaves Aurora and passes into the Denver Gateway area; Aurora's Gateway Park development is adjacent. Cyclists are allowed to use the shoulder of the freeway north of East 40th Avenue. An interchange with Green Valley Ranch Boulevard provides access to the neighborhood of the same name. The East 56th Avenue interchange is the final exit along Peña Boulevard before it turns east near the Rocky Mountain Arsenal National Wildlife Refuge and reaches the interchange with Tower Road, which serves several airport hotels.

The only intermediate freeway interchange on Peña Boulevard is a full cloverleaf interchange with the tolled E-470, which provides an alternate north–south route to I-25 for travelers wishing to bypass on the eastern side of Metropolitan Denver area. E-470 also has an interchange with I-70 and has a ten-mile-per-hour (16 km/h) higher speed limit than Peña Boulevard. The interchange with E-470 is the easternmost exit of Peña Boulevard before entering Denver International Airport. Inside airport grounds, Peña Boulevard transitions from a freeway to a limited-access roadway system, intersects the car rental return area, and connects to the parking garages and terminal access roads. The airport and many of its facilities have "Peña Boulevard" street addresses; these are standardized by the United States Postal Service by replacing the Spanish ⟨ñ⟩ with the Latin ⟨n⟩ in their corresponding mailing addresses.

The segment of the freeway between I-70 and E-470 is listed on the National Highway System (NHS), a system of roads that are important to the nation's economy, defense, and mobility. The portion between E-470 and the airport is listed as a MAP-21 NHS Principal Arterial.

== History ==
Construction of the $18 million (equivalent to $35.2 million in 2024) freeway, which opened in 1995, was halted for six weeks during summer 1992 due to a family of burrowing owls living in the right-of-way near the interchange at 56th Avenue. Ten thousand people were employed during the construction of the airport and the connecting freeway. A bike path was planned to parallel the freeway but never built; instead, in 2000, striping and signage were updated to allow cyclists to use the shoulder.

Originally, the toll booths that served the parking lots were located 3.5 mi (5.6 km) from the entrance to the airport causing delays for persons just dropping off people at the airport. The toll booth was removed in 2000, and new booths were installed at the exits of the airport parking garages. Peña Boulevard was named for Federico Peña because he was very influential in bringing about the construction of Denver International Airport. In October 2018, a missing ramp at Tower Road and Peña Boulevard was finally added and opened to the public in October 2018, completing the interchange.

== Future ==
The Denver City Council has approved an expansion of the freeway; the project will add lanes, modify interchanges, add new signage, and modify many areas along the route at a cost of $93 million. The Jackson Gap interchange will become a Diverging diamond interchange, with a Texas U-turn style ramp between the westbound Peña off-ramp and eastbound Peña onramp for traffic to return to the terminal. The project, which was originally expected to begin in January 2020, and expected to last around two-and-a-half years, has not been completed, and is now expected to end in January 2026.

== Exit list ==
County	Location	mi	km	Exit	Destinations	Notes
Adams	Aurora	0.0	0.0	—	I-70 west (US 36) to I-225 south – Denver, Colorado Springs	Exit 284 on I-70
City and County of Denver		0.7	1.1	1A	40th Avenue / Airport Boulevard to I-70 east – Aurora	Westbound exit and eastbound entrance
City and County of Denver		1.4	2.3	1B	Green Valley Ranch Boulevard	
City and County of Denver		2.5	4.0	2	56th Avenue	
City and County of Denver		5.2	8.4	5	Tower Road	Ramp from southbound Tower Road to westbound Peña Boulevard completed and opened in 2018
City and County of Denver		6.5	10.5	6	E-470 to I-70 – Colorado Springs, Boulder, Fort Collins	Signed as exits 6A (south) and 6B (north); exit 28 on E-470
City and County of Denver		7.6	12.2	7	75th Avenue – Rental Car Return, Cell Phone Lot	Eastbound exit and westbound entrance
City and County of Denver		9.4	15.1	9	Jackson Gap Road – Rental Car Return, Air Cargo, General Aviation	
City and County of Denver		11.1	17.9	11	Terminal West / Terminal East	Roadway divides for parking and terminals
1.000 mi = 1.609 km; 1.000 km = 0.621 mi: Incomplete access; Tolled
