= Begole =

Begole or BeGole is an American surname. Notable people with the surname include:

- Brian BeGole, American politician
- George D. Begole (1877–1956), American politician
- Josiah Begole (1815–1896), American politician
