= J. Quigg Newton =

American academic administrator and politician (1911–2003)

36th Mayor of Denver
- In office 1947–1955
- Preceded by: Benjamin F. Stapleton
- Succeeded by: Will Nicholson

8th President of the University of Colorado
- In office 1956–1963
- Preceded by: Ward Darley
- Succeeded by: Joseph R. Smiley

22nd President of the National League of Cities
- In office 1950
- Preceded by: DeLesseps Story Morrison
- Succeeded by: William F. Devin

Personal details
- Born: August 3, 1911 Denver, Colorado, U.S.
- Died: April 4, 2003 (aged 91) Colorado, U.S.
- Party: Republican (before 1954); Democratic (after 1954)

James Quigg Newton Jr. (August 3, 1911 – April 4, 2003) was an American lawyer, academic administrator, and politician. He served as the mayor of Denver, Colorado from 1947 to 1955. He was president of the University of Colorado from 1956 to 1963.

== Early life ==
Newton was born on August 3, 1911, in Denver, Colorado. His father was a successful businessman. He spent his childhood between Denver and New York City.

Newton was educated at the public schools in Denver, followed by Phillips Academy in Andover, Massachusetts. He attended Yale University, graduating with an AB in 1933. This was followed by graduating from Yale Law School in 1936.

== Early career ==
Newton was a legal assistant to William O. Douglas, commissioner of the U.S. Securities and Exchange Commission. In 1937, he began working Denver law firm of Lewis and Grant. He was a founding partner of Newton, Davis and Drinkwater in 1939. His partner, Richard Davis, was his Yale classmate and brother-in-law. The firm merged with Lewis & Grant in 1947 to form Lewis, Grant, Newton, Davis & Henry, which later became Lewis, Grant & Davis, and then Davis Graham & Stubbs.

In 1937, Newton became a lecturer in law at the University of Denver. Newton served as a legal officer with the Naval Transport Command of the US Navy in the Second World War. After the war, he became the president of the board of trustees of the University of Denver.

== Mayoralty ==
In 1947, aged 35, he ran for the office of mayor and defeated the incumbent, Benjamin F. Stapleton, who first became mayor in 1923. Newton was reelected in 1951, but declined to run for a third term in 1955. While he was mayor, Newton oversaw the construction of the Denver Museum of Nature and Science, the Denver Coliseum, the Denver Botanic Gardens, the Valley Highway, and expansion of Stapleton Airport, and the downtown public library.

Newton served on the Republican National Committee. In 1950, he served as president of the National League of Cities.

Towards the end of his mayoralty, he unsuccessfully ran to become the Democratic candidate for the U.S. Senate in 1954.

== Post mayoralty ==
After leaving office as mayor, he became the president of the Ford Foundation for eighteen months. He was president of the University of Colorado from 1956 to 1963. He was aso president of the Commonwealth Fund in New York from 1963 to 1976.

Newton became a fellow at the Center for Advanced Study of the Behavior Science Center in California for a year, followed by the Henry J. Kaiser Foundation for two years.

He returned to practice law at Davis Graham & Stubbs in Denver from 1980 to his death in 2003.

== Personal life ==
Newton married Virginia Shafroth in 1942. She was the granddaughter of John F. Shafroth who served as US Senator and Governor of Colorado. They had four daughters. Newton died from a heart attack in Denver, Colorado, on April 4, 2003.
