= Benjamin F. Stapleton =

American politician (1869–1950)

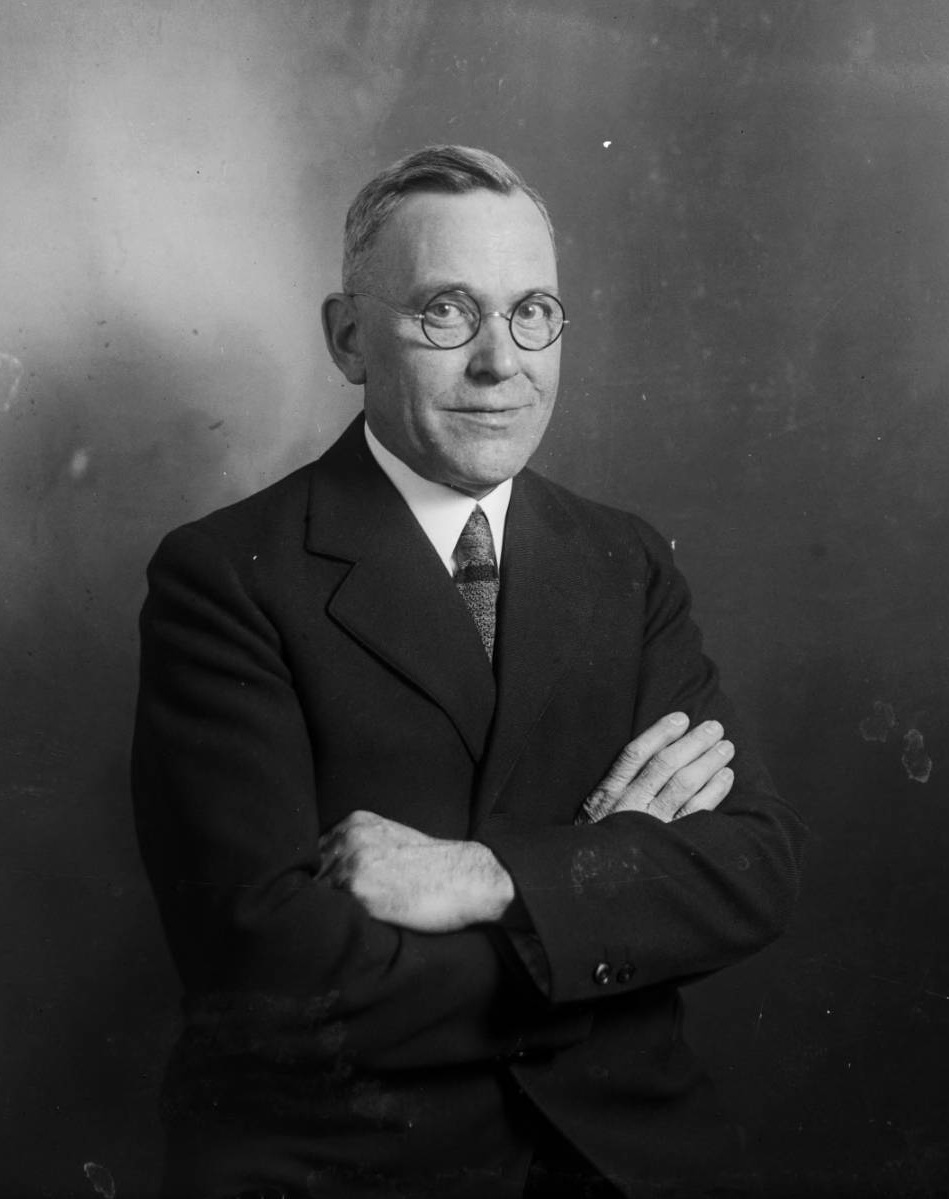
- Stapleton, circa 1930

33rd and 35th Mayor of Denver
- In office 1935–1947
- Preceded by: George D. Begole
- Succeeded by: J. Quigg Newton
- In office 1923–1931
- Preceded by: Dewey C. Bailey
- Succeeded by: George D. Begole

Colorado State Auditor
- In office 1933–1935
- Preceded by: William D. MacGinnis
- Succeeded by: Homer Bedford

Personal details
- Born: Benjamin Franklin Stapleton; November 12, 1869 Paintsville, Kentucky, U.S.
- Died: May 23, 1950 (aged 80) Denver, Colorado, U.S.
- Party: Democratic
- Spouse: Mabel Freeland
- Children: Lois Jane and Benjamin, Jr.

Military service
- Allegiance: United States
- Branch/service: United States Army
- Battles/wars: Spanish–American War

Benjamin Franklin Stapleton (November 12, 1869 – May 23, 1950) was the mayor of Denver, Colorado, for two periods (comprising five terms), the first from 1923 to 1931 and the second from 1935 to 1947. He also served as the Democratic Colorado State Auditor from 1933 to 1935 and was a member of the Ku Klux Klan.

== Early years ==
Stapleton was born November 12, 1869, in Paintsville, Kentucky, son of Elizabeth Jane Newman (1851–1927) and Samuel Stapleton (1847–1911). He attended National Normal University in Lebanon, Ohio, graduating with a law degree. Early in the 1890s, Stapleton went to live in Denver, and in 1899, he was admitted to the Colorado Bar.

On June 21, 1917, Stapleton married Mabel Freeland, with whom he had 2 children, Lois Jane and Benjamin, Junior.

Stapleton enlisted for service in the Spanish–American War. He served with the First Colorado Regiment, Company 1, Colorado Volunteers Infantry in the Philippine Islands, rising to the rank of first sergeant.

At the conclusion of his war-time service, Stapleton returned to Denver to practice law and first became actively interested in politics, helping found the Veterans of Foreign Wars.

Stapleton later became a member of the Ku Klux Klan.

== Political career ==
Stapleton's political career began in 1904 as police magistrate, where he remained until 1915, when President Woodrow Wilson appointed him postmaster. During his appointment, he oversaw the completion of the Denver Post Office building.

As chronicled by Robert Alan Goldberg in his book Hooded Empire : The Ku Klux Klan in Colorado, Stapleton was the Klan candidate for mayor of Denver in 1923 and won the election with Klan support. When Stapleton declared his candidacy for mayor in March 1923, he was Klan member number 1,128 and a close friend of the Colorado Klan Grand Dragon, John Galen Locke. Rumors of Stapleton's Klan membership circulated during the mayoral campaign. Stapleton responded by denying that he was a Klan member and condemning the Klan, "to appease his Jewish and Catholic supporters." Stapleton declared, "True Americanism needs no mask or disguise. Any attempt to stir up racial prejudices or religious intolerance is contrary to our constitution and is therefore un-American." The voters believed Stapleton's denial and he was elected, defeating an unpopular incumbent, Dewey Bailey. Stapleton then appointed fellow Klansmen to multiple positions in Denver government, though he initially resisted Klan pressure to appoint a Klansman as chief of police.

An anti-Stapleton backlash developed due to the Klan's infiltration of Denver government. The anti-Stapleton coalition began the process of petitioning for a recall election. Stapleton knew that to survive the recall he would need Klan support. He capitulated to the Klan demand that he appoint a Klansman as police chief, with the result that the police department became in effect a Klan organization. This galvanized the anti-Stapleton forces and they succeeded in forcing a recall election of Stapleton in August 1924.

According to Goldberg's description of the recall election, "[t]he Klan dominated the Stapleton campaign, contributing more than $15,000 and scores of election workers." "On July 14, 1924, Mayor Stapleton addressed a Klan gathering on South Table Mountain and reaffirmed his commitment: 'I have little to say, except that I will work with the Klan and for the Klan in the coming election, heart and soul. And if I am reelected, I shall give the Klan the kind of administration it wants.'" The anti-Stapleton coalition had run a poor candidate against Stapleton in the recall election (Dewey Bailey, the incumbent mayor Stapleton defeated in 1923), and Stapleton won the recall election by a landslide. On the night of the election, Denver Klansmen burned crosses on South Table Mountain to signify their victory.

Cracks in the Klan's stranglehold on Denver began appearing early in 1925. Stapleton ordered the Good Friday vice raids on April 10, 1925, bypassing the Klan police chief he had appointed under pressure from KKK leaders. The raid rounded up over 200 bootleggers, prostitutes, and gamblers and exposed a dozen Klan members who had been serving in the police force, who were ultimately dismissed. On June 30, 1925, Colorado Klansmen voted to banish Stapleton, Senator Rice Means, Secretary of State Carl S. Milliken and six other members of the mayor's city hall faction from the Klan in a statement of loyalty to Grand Dragon Locke, who was under fire from national Klan forces. Locke, however, remained in power, but two weeks later, Stapleton declared his independence from Locke and the Colorado Klan by firing the Klan police chief, Candlish, whom he had appointed earlier in his term to appease them.

In 1932, Stapleton won election to the post of state auditor. Unsatisfied, Stapleton decided in 1935 to campaign again for election as for mayor, winning in that year and also in 1939 and 1943.

== Projects ==
Stapleton was responsible for many civic improvements during his five terms as mayor of Denver. Most projects attributed to Stapleton were during his third term as mayor when he had access to funds and manpower from the New Deal. During this time, he saw through the creation of the Denver Civic Center and the Denver Municipal Airport, and the considerable expansion of Denver Mountain Parks system, including the Amphitheatre at Red Rocks Park.

=== Denver Municipal Airport ===
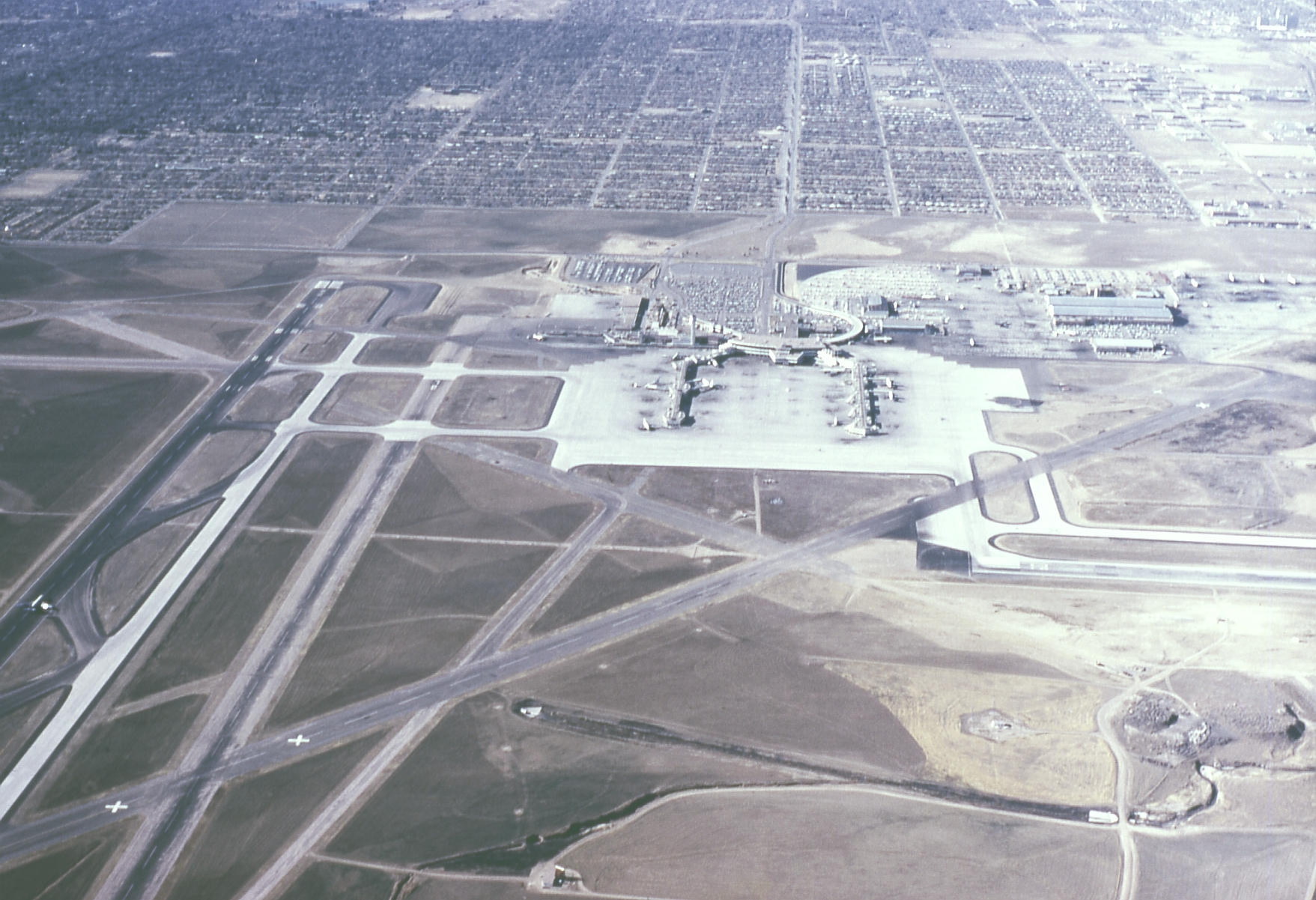
Denver Municipal Airport was later renamed in honor of Stapleton.

The construction of Denver Municipal Airport was begun in early 1929 and completed that same year. Its grand opening celebration took place over four days from October 17–20 – a week before the stock market crashed. It was widely viewed at the time as a huge boondoggle. Stapleton was excoriated as either corrupt or incompetent, or both, for having the taxpayers subsidize a mere plaything of the wealthy; what the Denver Post sneeringly dubbed "Stapleton's Folly", and others jokingly called "Rattlesnake Hollow". It was viewed by some as too far from civilization to be practicable. The close relationship Stapleton seemed to have with land-owning political backers who stood to benefit, conspicuous among them H. Brown Canon of Windsor Farm Dairy, were a factor in his loss in the 1931 mayoral election to George D. Begole. The airport was later renamed Stapleton International Airport on August 25, 1944, in his honor. Today, the airport no longer exists, replaced by a neighborhood, which was named Stapleton. After two previous attempts, the name of the neighborhood was changed to Central Park amid increasing political and racial pressure on August 1, 2020, due to Stapleton's adherence to white supremacy and controversial membership in the Ku Klux Klan.

=== Red Rocks Amphitheatre ===
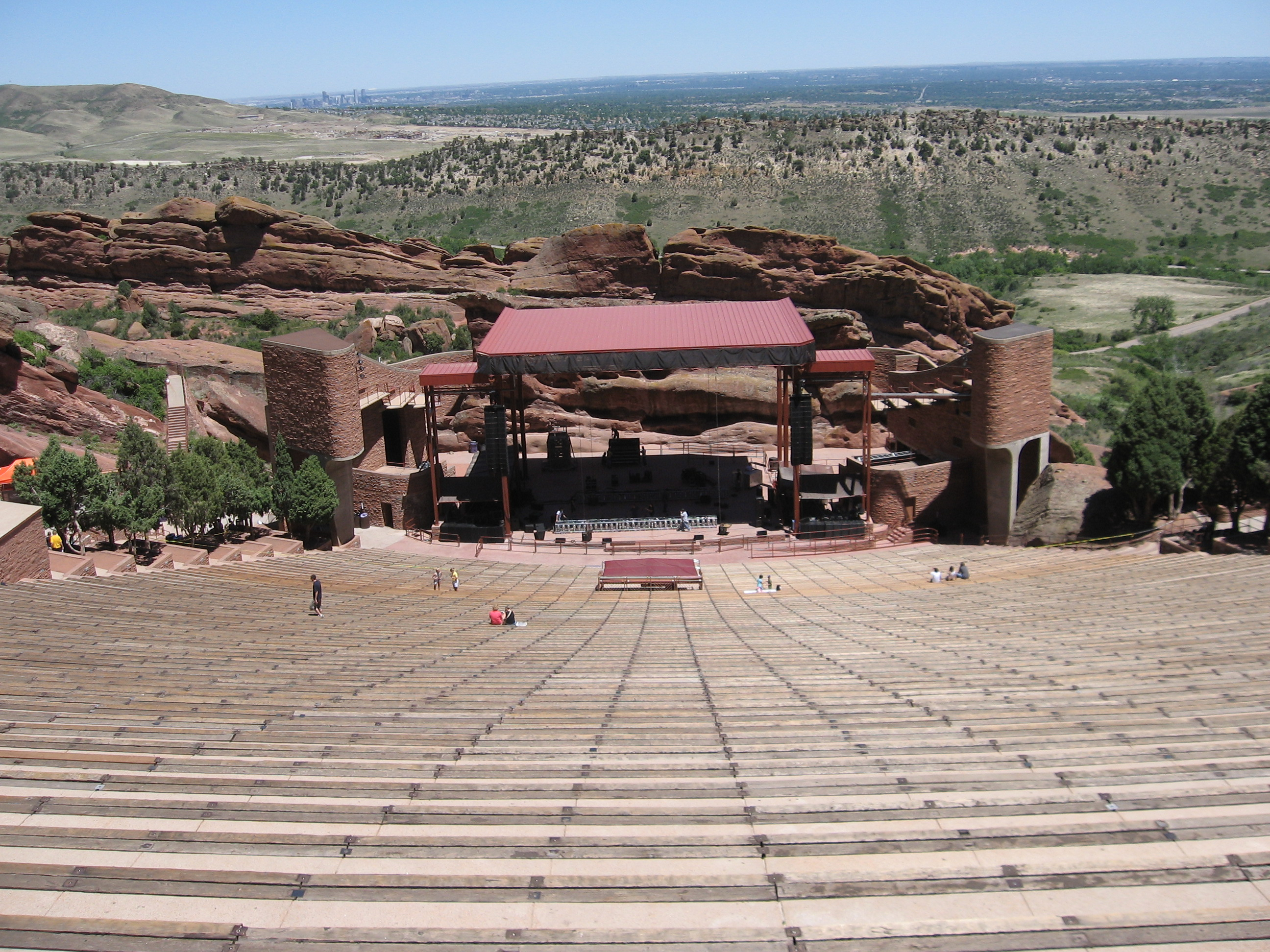
Stapleton was against the construction of the Red Rocks Amphitheatre and wanted to preserve the unique landscape.

In 1935, Stapleton appointed George Cranmer, a wealthy former stockbroker, as manager of Improvements and Parks. Cranmer had luckily pulled his assets out of the stock market a year before the crash of 1929. The two, as it turned out, had completely different visions for what to do with a particularly striking locale at Red Rocks Park.

Some time before his appointment, while Cranmer pondered a boulder field that was surmounted by large projecting rocks on either side, his thoughts drifted to a memory of something he had once seen while on tour in Sicily: an ancient Greek open-air theater with stone seating. He began to envision something similar, yet unique, for this location.

Whereas Cranmer dreamed of clearing a starry-skied stage, Stapleton saw the boulders strewn there as the members of a naturally formed, one-of-a-kind 'rock garden', and wanted them preserved.

Unbeknownst to Stapleton, Cranmer was attempting to persuade the Civilian Conservation Corps (CCC) to quietly go ahead with plans to demolish the rocks with dynamite. He was successful in this, and the rocks were razed. With Stapleton's rock garden removed, the process began of hiring architects to design and oversee the eventual building of the Red Rocks Amphitheatre.

Other projects during Stapleton's tenure as mayor include Denver's water system and the Valley Highway project.

== After politics ==
Stapleton's career in politics ended when he lost his 1947 mayoral re-election bid to J. Quigg Newton.

Stapleton died on May 23, 1950, at his home in Denver. He is the great-grandfather of Walker Stapleton, who was elected Colorado Treasurer in 2010, and the grandfather of Craig Roberts Stapleton, former U.S. ambassador to France and the Czech Republic.

== Controversy ==
In early 2018, Stapleton's great-grandson, Walker Stapleton, a candidate for governor of Colorado, was accused of paying off the History Colorado Center to remove mention of the family's ties with the white supremacy movement and the beginnings of the Ku Klux Klan in America from their exhibitions.

In June 2020, in the period after the murder of George Floyd the Stapleton Master Community Association (MCA) voted to rename the neighborhood of Stapleton, Denver because of his links to white supremacy and the KKK. The neighborhood has since been voted to be renamed Central Park, after its largest green space. The name garnered 63% of the final vote, beating the other finalist, Skyview.
