= Strock =

Strock (otherwise Ströck) is a surname. Notable people with the surname include:

- Albert Ströck (1903–71), Romanian-Hungarian soccer player
- Carl A. Strock (born c. 1948), United States Army officer
- Don Strock (born 1950), American football player and coach
- George Strock, American photojournalist
- Ian Randal Strock, founder of SFScope website
- James Strock, American entrepreneur, professional speaker and writer
- Herbert L. Strock (1918–2005), American television producer and director and film director
