= Lisa Witter =

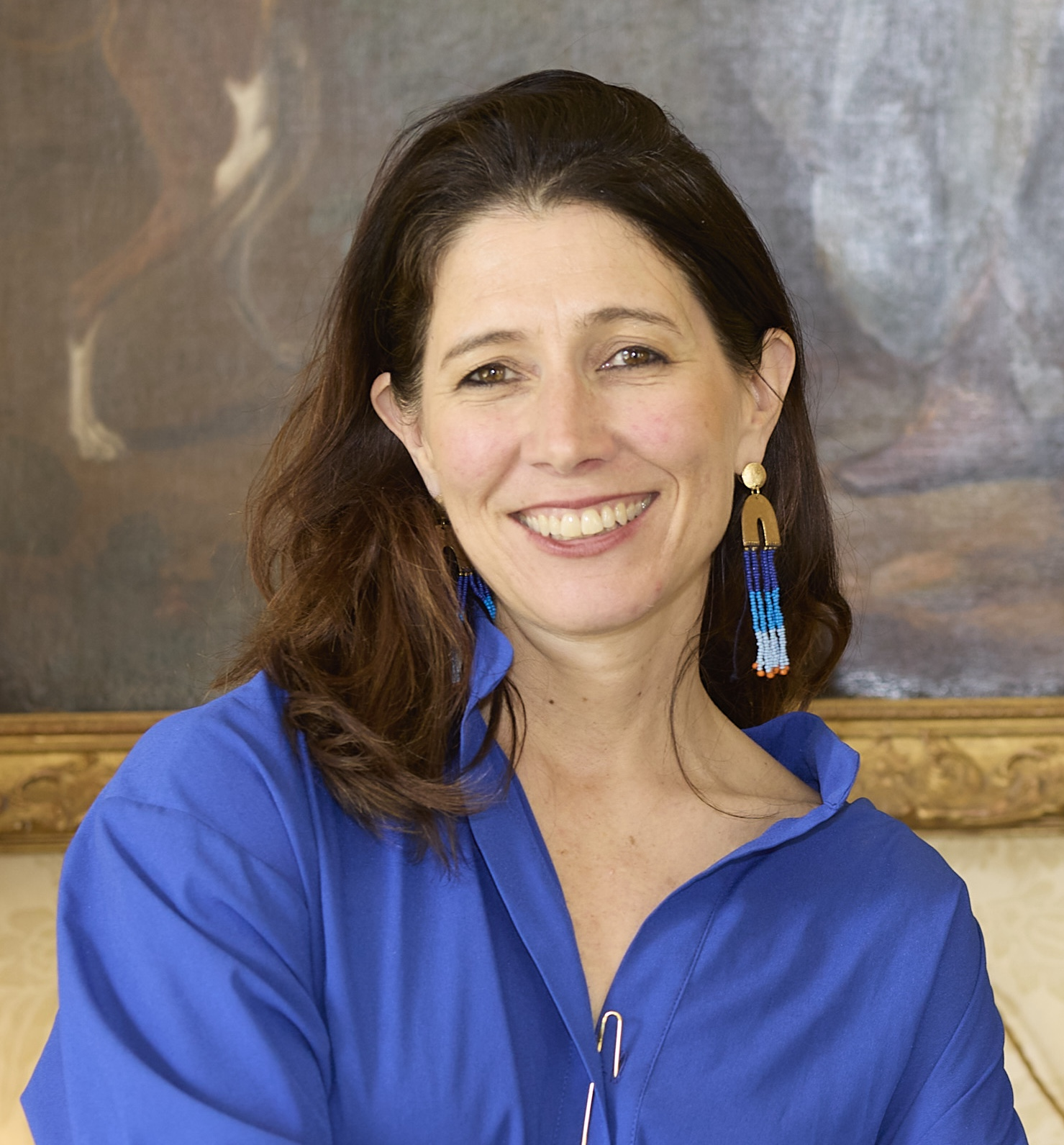
Lisa Witter at a Public Sector Strategy Network event, 2024.

Lisa Witter (born July 5, 1973) is an American entrepreneur and author. She is a co-author of The She Spot and has been Chief Strategy Officer and Chief Operating Officer of the public relations firm Fenton Communications. As of 2018, she was Executive Chairman of the policy platform Apolitical.

Witter is also the Co-Founder of the Institute for a Democratic Future, Emerge, and the Apolitical Academy. She serves on the board of Hoc Rosten, Stonyfield Farms, is an advisor to Care.com as well as Co-Chairs the Global Future Council on Agile Government for the World Economic Forum. She regularly contributes pieces on politics, communications, policy and social change.

== Career ==
Witter is the partner and Chief Change Officer of Fenton Communications. She has worked on or volunteered for numerous political campaigns and is focused on elected Democratic women. She served as legislative aide for Seattle City Council Member Peter Steinbreuck.

She is an emeritus member of the board of directors for Climate Counts, the national advisory board for MomsRising.org, the Op-Ed Project, Vittana.org and the communications advisory council for Women for Women International.

With Robyn Scott, she co-founded Apolitical, a global platform for policymakers.

With Lisa Chen, Witter wrote the 2008 book The She Spot: Why Women are the Market for Changing the World and How to Reach Them, which was reviewed positively in Publishers Weekly, Ode Magazine, and the Chronicle of Philanthropy.

Witter has appeared on television and radio as a political analyst and social commentator. She has been featured on CBS, MSNBC, Fox, and on NPR.

In 2004, Witter was a contestant on the Showtime reality show American Candidate and came in third place.

In 2010, Witter was named one of 197 Young Global Leaders by the World Economic Forum.
