= Central Park station (RTD) =

Commuter rail station in Denver, Colorado

Central Park
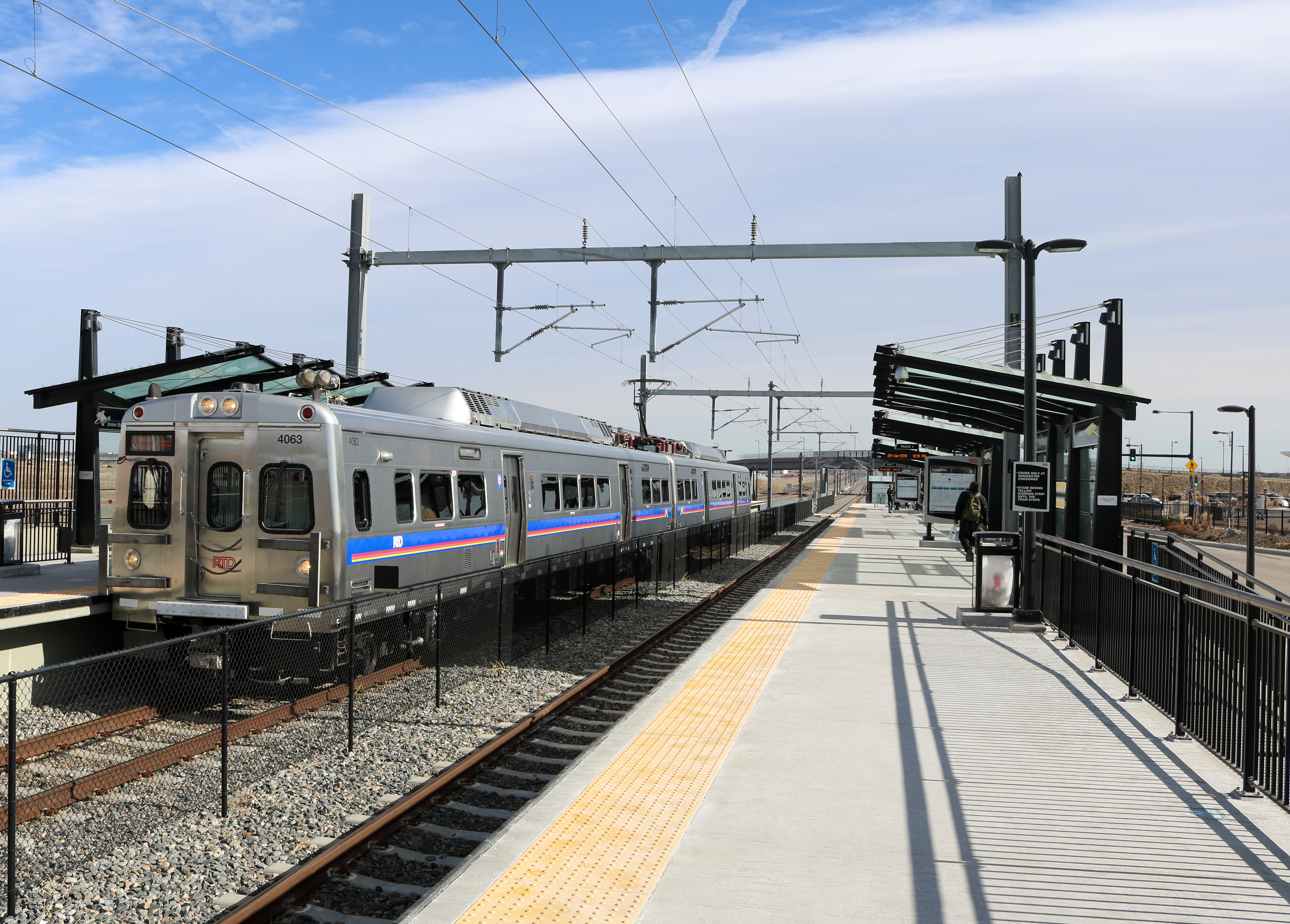
- A Union Station bound train at Central Park station.

General information
- Location: 8175 East Smith Road; Denver, Colorado
- Coordinates: 39°46′13.3″N 104°53′29.9″W
- Owner: Regional Transportation District
- Line: East Corridor
- Platforms: 2 side platforms
- Tracks: 2
- Connections: RTD Bus: 28, 37, 38, 42, 43, 65, 73, 88, 105

Construction
- Structure type: At-grade
- Parking: 1,500 spaces
- Cycle facilities: 8 lockers, 14 racks
- Accessible: Yes

History
- Opened: April 22, 2016

Passengers
- 2025: 3,528 (average daily)
- Rank: 6 out of 75

Services
Preceding station	RTD	Following station
40th & Colorado toward Union Station	A Line	Peoria toward Denver Airport
Location

Central Park is a Regional Transportation District (RTD) commuter rail and bus station on the A Line in the Central Park neighborhood of Denver, Colorado. The station is named after the neighborhood. It opened on April 22, 2016, along with the rest of the A Line.

== Station layout ==
1F

Platform Level

Union Pacific corridor
Side platform, doors will open on the right
Westbound
← toward Union Station (40th & Colorado)
Eastbound
toward Denver Airport (Peoria) →
Side platform, doors will open on the right
Smith Road; bus bays; parking

The station is located near Smith Road and Central Park Boulevard in the Central Park neighborhood, itself a redevelopment of the decommissioned Stapleton International Airport. It replaced the former Stapleton Park and Ride. The station is served by several bus routes and also has 1,500 parking spaces in a park-and-ride lot, the largest on the A Line. Bus service to the station began six months before the A Line began operations, on September 13, 2015.

Central Park is the closest RTD station to Dick's Sporting Goods Park, home of the Colorado Rapids. The stadium sits 3 miles north of the station on the opposite side of Interstate 70, requiring a bus connection to reach it.

== Public art ==
Central Park station features the sculpture Balloon Man Running, commissioned as a part of RTD's Art-n-Transit program. The art piece was created by Sean O'Meallie and installed in 2016. It is 12 feet tall and sits on a 20 foot tall platform above the station's park-n-ride lot. The piece is said to represent the "anyman" running to catch a train, in addition to being a visual landmark within the station.
