= Central Park, Denver =

Central Park, Denver, Colorado
- Neighborhoods in Denver
- Location in the state of Colorado

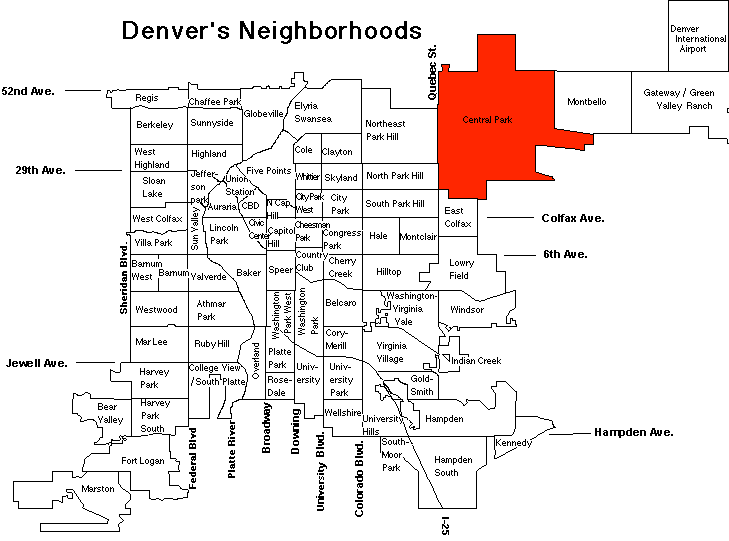
- Location within the County/City of Denver, Colorado
- Coordinates: 39.7580°N 104.8906°W
- Country: United States
- State: Colorado
- County: Denver
- Established: 2001
- Founder: Mayor Wellington Webb
- Elevation: 5,312 ft (1,619 m)
- Time zone: UTC–7 (MST)
  - Summer (DST): UTC–6 (MDT)
- ZIP code: 80238, 80010
- Area codes: 303, 720
- Website: www.denver80238.com

The Central Park neighborhood hosts a community festival with apartments in the background of "Founders Green" located in the urbanized Central Park that shares the neighborhood's name.

Central Park, previously Stapleton, is a neighborhood within the city limits of Denver and Aurora, Colorado. Located east of downtown Denver, the neighborhood is at the former site of the decommissioned Stapleton International Airport, which closed in 1995. It is the largest residential neighborhood within the city of Denver. The Central Park neighborhood contains twelve specifically named sub-neighborhoods, 11 public/private schools, 50 parks (including city regional and community pocket-parks), 7 pools, several shopping and business districts, a city of Denver recreation center, and a Denver library. The latest population as of 2022 is estimated at 30,000.

Since April 2016, the Central Park neighborhood has been connected to the Denver downtown area by RTD's A line, a commuter rail service that runs from the downtown Denver transit hub to Denver International Airport.

The neighborhood consists of varying architectural styles (from ultra modern to traditional). The vast majority of single-family homes have alley-loaded garages. The types of housing also varies (including single-family, condos, live-work townhomes, row homes, duplexes, and high-density apartments).

The 80238 zip code (which encompasses almost all of the Central Park community and is entirely within the neighborhood) is known as one of the wealthiest or highest average household income zip codes in the Denver metro area.

In 2020, the local community voted to change its long established name from Stapleton to Central Park.

== History ==
While Denver International Airport was being constructed, planners considered how the unused Stapleton Airport would be redeveloped. A private group of Denver civic leaders, the Stapleton Development Foundation, convened in 1990 and produced a master plan for the site in 1995, emphasizing a pedestrian-oriented design rather than the automobile-oriented designs found in many other planned developments. Nearly a third of the airport site was planned to be redeveloped as public park space.

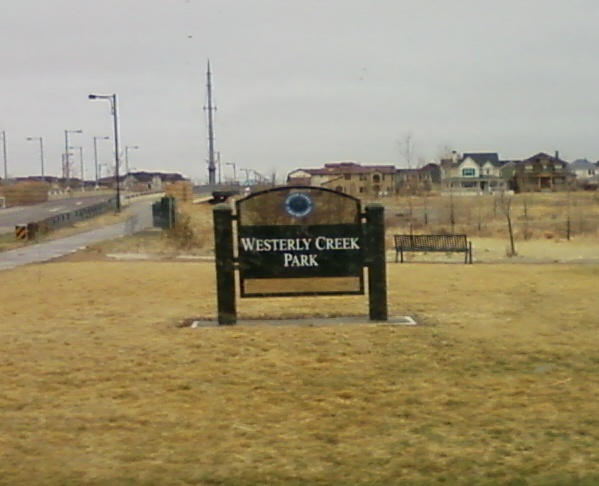
One of many city of Denver parks within Central Park

The community was visioned to be home to approximately 30,000 residents with around 12,000 homes, an 80-acre Denver park named "Central Park", (Note: The community was later renamed "Central Park", in part due to the park's name.) a commuter-rail station, 14 schools, 10,000,000 sq ft (930,000 m^{2}) of planned office space, 1,500,000 sq ft (140,000 m^{2}) of retail space, and 1,100 acres (4.5 km^{2}) for parks and open space. Central Park's neighborhood 1,100 acres (4.5 km^{2}) of open space also borders the restored Sand Creek Regional Greenway and Bluff Lake Nature Center, one of the nation's largest urban wildlife refuges.

The former airport had 4,700 acres (19 km^{2}) with only a short 10 minute drive to Downtown Denver. It was/is redeveloped by Forest City Enterprises/Brookfield as a new urbanist project.

Construction began in 2001, under then Mayor Wellington Webb. The new community is currently zoned for residential and commercial development, including office parks, mixed-use development, and "big box" shopping centers.

The Central Park neighborhood is by far the largest neighborhood in the city of Denver, and a small southeastern portion of the redevelopment site lies in the neighboring city of Aurora. Part of this area in Aurora is the Bluff Lake area.

In 2004, residents moved into what was then named the neighborhood's first apartments, increasing its population to 2,500 residents.

In 2006, the community's population grew above 5,000 and the Denver School of Science and Technology opened along with The Shops at Northfield.

In 2007, the 80 acres (32 ha) 'Central Park' opened, which later became the namesake for the neighborhood's new name, Central Park. Additionally, commercial properties expanded by adding 3 new office buildings and the population surpassed 7,500 people.

As of 2008, 3,200 single-family houses, row houses, condominiums and other for-sale housing, has been built.

As of 2011, more than 14,000 people lived in the neighborhood, and the trail network reached 38 miles (61 km). The former Stapleton development project received national recognition as the site of the 2011 HGTV Green Home. Additionally, new interstate exits opened, connecting Central Park Boulevard to I-70, I-270 and neighborhoods south of the interstate.

In 2016, The RTD A-Line directly connects Denver's Union Station located in Downtown Denver, through the Central Park neighborhood, to Denver International Airport. Central Park station is the lone commuter rail stop in the community.

In 2019, the Central Park RTD Station and its surrounding area was expanded by transit-oriented development, it now spans five blocks; which includes upscale apartments, offices, a new hotel and retail shops. However, there are still some vacant lots ready for Transit-Oriented Development within this area as of 2026.

In 2020, in the wake of the Black Lives Matter movement and to condemn the legacy of the former Denver mayor Benjamin F. Stapleton, once a member of the Ku Klux Klan, the community formally changed the name of the neighborhood from 'Stapleton' to 'Central Park'. The new name draws inspiration from the 80 acre flagship park named "Central Park" within the neighborhood. The main north–south arterial roadway through the neighborhood is also named Central Park Blvd, the RTD rail/bus station is 'Central Park', and there is also the Central Park Recreation Center (a city of Denver recreation center). All of these were previously named 'Central Park' when they were developed/built several years prior.

The Northfield portion of Central Park still has significant residential development occurring. This part of the Central Park neighborhood lies north of I-70.

There are still a few vacant larger parcels throughout older parts of the neighborhood (south and north of I-70) ready for specifically pre-planned developments of mixed-use, transit-oriented, high-density residential, or commercial development.

As of 2022, the entire Central Park neighborhood has an estimated population of 30,000, and is still growing as the last new homes are still being finished by 2025 (although some infill will still occur after this). Being the largest neighborhood in Denver, there are continual issues with crime statistics and other demographics that aren't accurate because the lack of context (per capita, per square mile, etc.). The neighborhood's very large land mass compared to peer neighborhoods (often the size of 5 other neighborhoods combined), high population, and number of high trafficked amenities (Northfield mall, Quebec Square, large swath of I-70, etc.) is not taken into consideration when many statistics are released.

== Sub-neighborhoods ==
There are twelve specifically named sub-neighborhoods within Central Park:

- North End Neighborhood
- Central Park North
- Beeler Park
- Bluff Lake
- Conservatory Green
- Central Park West
- East 29th Avenue
- Eastbridge
- South End
- Westerly Creek
- Wicker Park
- Willow Park East

== Transportation ==
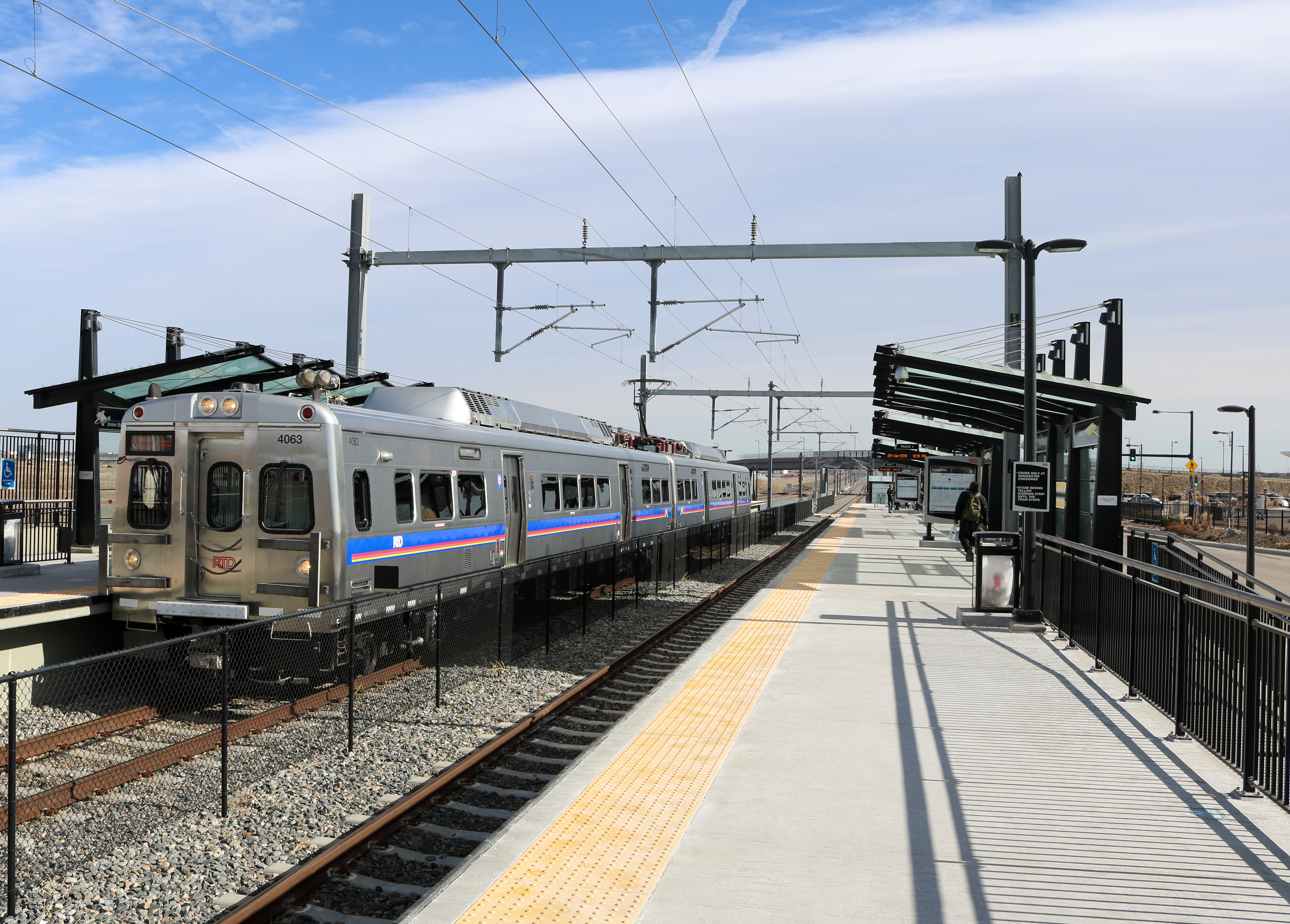
The A-line commuter rail Central Park station

Central Park is served by the Central Park commuter rail and bus station, with direct connections to Union Station in downtown and the Denver International Airport via the A Line. The A Line travels up to 79 miles per hour, but rarely gets to that speed. Central Park also offers direct access to the east and west I-70 corridor and the 270 interchange. Served by Denver metro's RTD, Central Park has bus lines that intersect east/west and north–south. Dedicated bike lanes and bike paths are also prevalent.

== Name change ==
The original airport was named for Benjamin Franklin Stapleton (November 12, 1869 – May 23, 1950), a low level member of the Ku Klux Klan who was the Mayor of Denver for five nonconsecutive terms: from 1923 to 1931 and from 1935 to 1947. He was also the Democratic Colorado State Auditor from 1933 to 1935. Stapleton's membership in the Klan was driven by political expediency, to help forestall a recall election in 1924, but by June 1925 Stapleton fired the Klan-affiliated police chief and welcomed the NAACP convention that June.

In 2015 and 2019, there were failed attempts to rename Stapleton.

On August 1, 2020, after a series of neighborhood debates and votes over the previous 12 months, the residents chose "Central Park" as the new name of the neighborhood. 63% of the voters selected the new name over the other finalist, "Skyview".

== See also ==
- Bibliography of Colorado
- Geography of Colorado
- History of Colorado
- Index of Colorado-related articles
- List of Colorado-related lists
  - List of neighborhoods in Denver
  - List of populated places in Colorado
- Outline of Colorado
