= The She Spot =

Book by Lisa Witter and Lisa Chen

- Author: Lisa Witter and Lisa Chen
- Language: English
- Genre: Non-fiction
- Publisher: Berrett-Koehler Publishers
- Publication date: June 1, 2008
- Publication place: United States
- Media type: Print (Hardback)
- Pages: 288
- ISBN: 978-1-57675-472-6
- OCLC: 213222933
- Dewey Decimal: 658.8/34082 22
- LC Class: HF5415.332.W66 W577 2008

The She Spot: Why Women are the Market for Changing the World – And How to Reach Them is a 2008 non-fiction book by Lisa Witter and Lisa Chen.

== Synopsis ==
The She Spot looks at the impact of women on social change, and focuses on the influence women have had on the world, as well as on volunteering. The book incorporates several case studies, polls, and the potential for women to be underrepresented in these polls and studies. It also covers the potential misrepresentation in marketing towards women.

== Critical reception ==
Critical reception for The She Spot has been positive, with Publishers Weekly calling it a "thoughtful, helpful guide to nonprofit marketers". AdAge's Matt Kinsey wrote that the book was "good fodder for discussion" but that he was unsure that Witter and Chen's "formula alone can commandeer a loyal female audience". A review in ForeWord magazine by Mary Spiro said that, "If one agrees with the premise that marketing has been male-centered or that the strategies they present are uniquely suited to impact women then this text offers plenty of practical advice for those courting female clientele" and that the end of chapter summaries offer "quick inspiration".
