= Davis Graham & Stubbs =

American law firm

Davis Graham
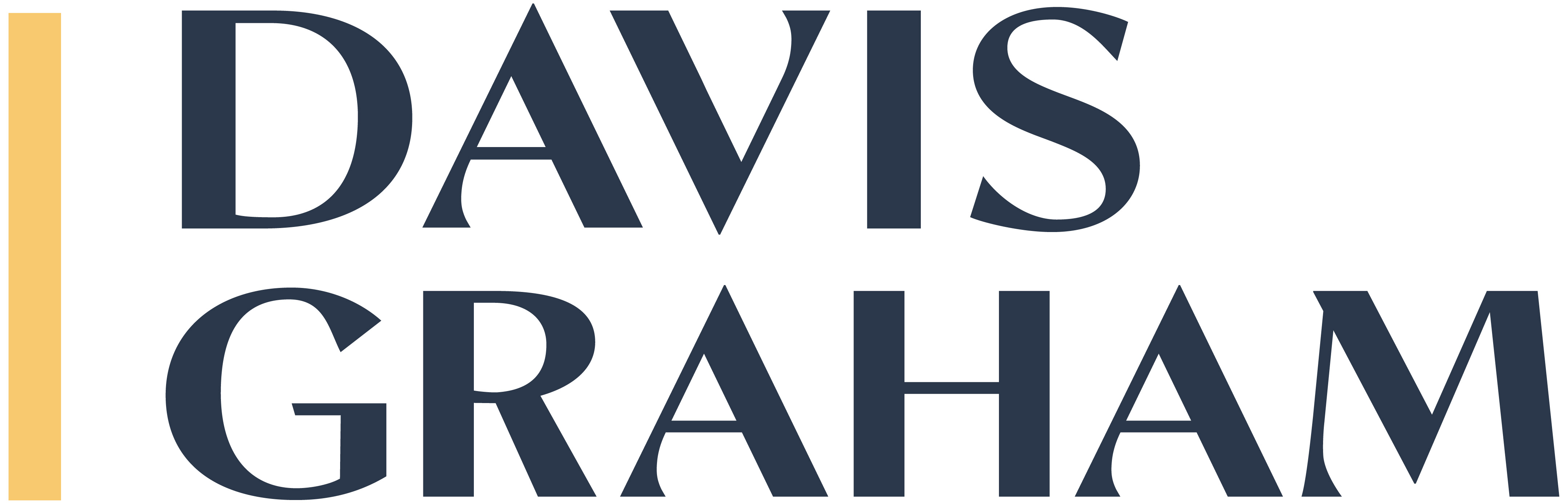
- Headquarters: Denver, Colorado, US
- No. of lawyers: 146
- Major practice areas: Corporate; environmental; labor; litigation
- Key people: Kristin Lentz, co-managing partner; Chad Williams, co-managing partner
- Date founded: 1915; 111 years ago
- Founder: Mason Lewis; James Grant
- Website: davisgraham.com

Davis Graham is a law firm with its office in Denver, Colorado. It is the second largest law firm in Colorado.

== History ==
The firm that became Davis Graham & Stubbs LLP was founded in Denver in 1915 by attorneys Mason Lewis and James Grant to provide tax advice after the passing of the 16th Amendment. The firm of Lewis & Grant merged with another Denver firm in 1947, forming Lewis, Grant, Newton, Davis & Henry, which later became Lewis, Grant & Davis. It was one of the four leading firms in Denver by 1964, when the firm changed its name from Lewis, Grant & Davis to Davis Graham & Stubbs.

=== Notable members ===
Partner J. Quigg Newton was elected Mayor of Denver in 1947. Other alumni elected to public office include US Senator Gary Hart, Governor John Arthur Love and Lieutenant Governor Joe Rogers. After playing football for the Pittsburgh Steelers, Byron White worked as a lawyer at the firm for about 15 years before becoming United States Deputy Attorney General in 1961 and then a justice of the Supreme Court of the United States in 1962.

In his memoir James Schroeder recounted that both he and his wife Pat Schroeder were interviewed for jobs at the firm by Don Hoagland when the couple were approaching graduation from Harvard Law School. According to Schroeder, Hoagland felt that conflicts of interest could arise if both a husband and wife practiced law in the same city; the firm did not make an offer for either of the Schroeders.

University of Southern California Law School professor W. David Slawson was an associate at Davis Graham when President Kennedy was assassinated. The firm granted him what was expected to be a two- to three-month leave of absence to work for what soon became the Warren Commission.

== The firm ==
The firm, which began to grow rapidly with the energy boom of the 1980s, has around 150 lawyers and is led by co-managing partners Kristin Lentz and Chad Williams. The firm is the member of the Lex Mundi legal network for the state of Colorado. The firm was ranked in "Band 1" in Colorado in the practice areas of "Corporate/M&A" and of "Natural Resources and Environment" in the 2016 edition of Chambers USA, and it is included in Vault.com's "Top 150 Under 150" list of leading midsized US law firms.

The firm opened a Washington office by 1982.

== Notable attorneys ==
- Byron White – Former NFL player and Associate Justice, U.S. Supreme Court 1962–1993
- John Arthur Love – 36th Governor of Colorado, 1963–1973
- J. Quigg Newton – 36th Mayor of Denver, 1947–1955
- Gary Hart – United States Senator from Colorado, 1975–1987
- Joe Rogers – 45th Lieutenant Governor of Colorado, 1999–2003
- David M. Ebel – Judge, Tenth Circuit Court of Appeals
- Timothy Tymkovich – Chief Judge, Tenth Circuit Court of Appeals, and potential nominee to the U.S. Supreme Court
- Christine Arguello – Judge, United States District Court for the District of Colorado
- Raymond P. Moore – Judge, United States District Court for the District of Colorado
- Rebecca Love Kourlis – Former Associate Justice, Colorado Supreme Court
- Gregory J. Hobbs Jr. – Former Associate Justice, Colorado Supreme Court
- James Strock – Former Secretary, California Environmental Protection Agency
