= 40th & Colorado station =

Commuter rail station in Denver, Colorado

40th•Colorado
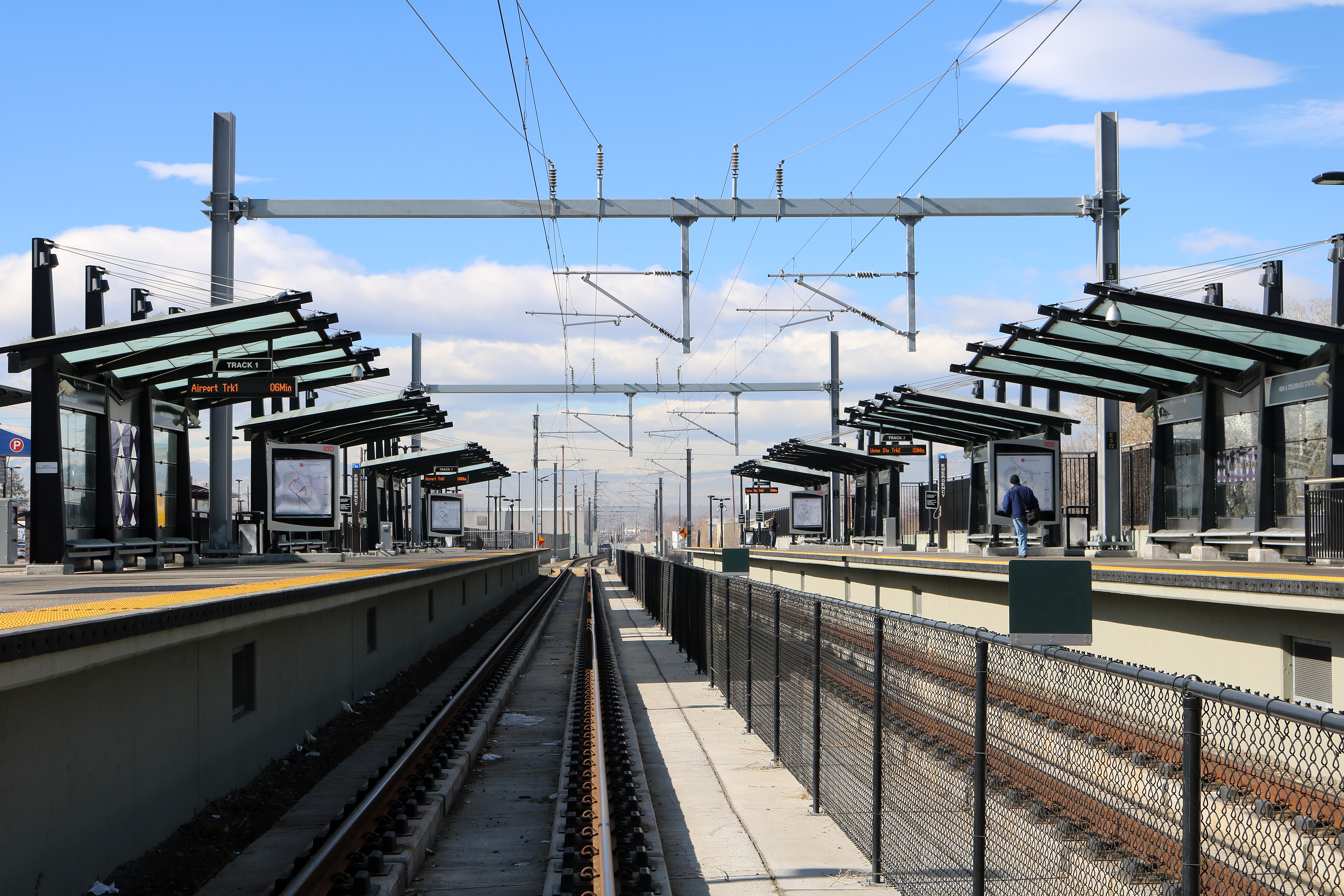
- 40th & Colorado station platforms, looking west

General information
- Location: 4220 Garfield Street; Denver, Colorado
- Coordinates: 39°46′33.8″N 104°56′33.3″W
- Owner: Regional Transportation District
- Line: East Corridor
- Platforms: 2 side platforms
- Tracks: 2
- Connections: RTD Bus: 24, 37, 40, 49, ART

Construction
- Structure type: At-grade
- Parking: 200 spaces
- Cycle facilities: 12 lockers, 18 racks
- Accessible: Yes

Other information
- Fare zone: Local

History
- Opened: April 22, 2016

Passengers
- 2025: 1,698 (average daily)
- Rank: 16 out of 75

Services
Preceding station	RTD	Following station
38th & Blake toward Union Station	A Line	Central Park toward Denver Airport
Location

40th & Colorado station (sometimes stylized as 40th•Colorado) is a Regional Transportation District (RTD) commuter rail station on the A Line in Denver, Colorado. The station opened on April 22, 2016, along with the rest of the A Line.

== Station layout ==
1F

Platform Level

Union Pacific corridor
Side platform, doors will open on the right
Westbound
← toward Union Station (38th & Blake)
Eastbound
toward Denver Airport (Central Park) →
Side platform, doors will open on the right
East 42nd Avenue; bus bays; parking

40th & Colorado station sits on the boundary between two Denver neighborhoods - Elyria-Swansea to the west, and Park Hill to the east. It is served by several bus routes and has a 200-space park-and-ride lot.

== Public art ==
40th & Colorado station features an art piece titled Hands On, commissioned as part of RTD's Art-n-Transit program. The piece, created by Erik Carlson, was installed in 2016 between the station's bus bay and eastbound platform. Hands On depicts images of 12 handtools from businesses and workshops in the area surrounding the station.
