= John Galen Locke =

American white supremacist (1871–1935)

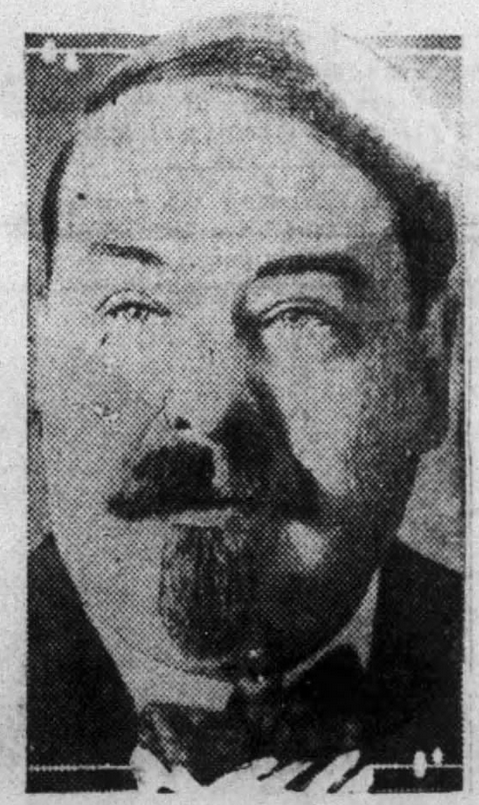
John Galen Locke (c. 1925)

John Galen Locke (1871 - April 1, 1935) was an American white supremacist who had political influence in Colorado during the 1920s. He was part of the Ku Klux Klan, serving as Grand Dragon, and was founder for the group in Colorado. Locke has been described as one of the most nefarious men in the history of Denver.

== Klan influence ==
Locke was an "instigator" of change in the Colorado political landscape that resulted in the Klan having significant influence and control over the political, social and business arenas of the state during the 1920s. The influence of the Klan ranged from city, county and state level politicians as well as emergency and health services across Colorado. Locke was recorded as saying "'we are not Republicans, we are not Democrats, we are Klansmen'. And you were expected to vote the Klan ticket from the top to the bottom." During the period of Locke's direction, Colorado became the second highest Klan membership per capita in the nation with an estimated 30,000 members in Denver out of a population of 107,000 men and local offices or Klaverns in all 64 counties of the state.

Locke's influence reached a zenith roughly from 1920 to 1927. A turning point was reached when he was arrested for contempt of court in a tax evasion case, a large blemish on his law and order image he projected, as well as overall failures to enact Klan goals through the legislature. He later had disputes with onetime Klan allies, Denver Mayor Benjamin Stapleton and United States Senator Rice W. Means. These issues culminated when he was asked to resign by the national Klan lawyer that was representing the organization.

Locke offered his resignation, however the local chapter did not accept it. This caused the national arm of the Klan to take action and freeze the accounts of the Colorado chapters. This in turn incited a large division between the national Klan and the local chapters with large numbers splintering to create a new group, "The Minute Men of America". This was only a short lived organization and despite the Klan inviting Locke to resume membership he declined, preferring to start the group "Order of Equals."

== Death ==
Locke died of a heart attack at a political meeting April 2, 1935, at the Brown Palace Hotel in Denver.
