= Bluff Lake Nature Center =

Nature center in Denver, Colorado, United States

Coordinates: 39°45′35″N 104°51′30″W

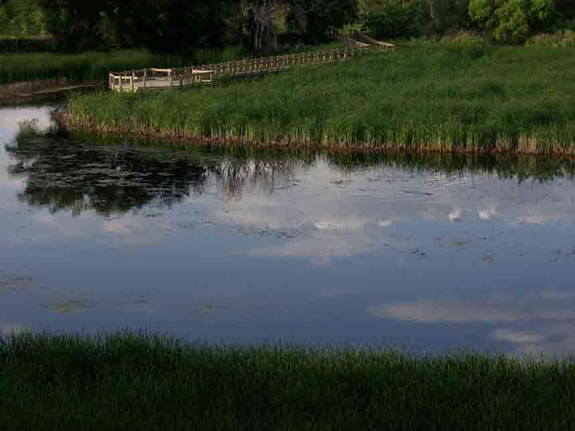
Reflections on Bluff Lake

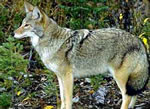
A coyote seen at Bluff Lake Nature Center in 2006.

Bluff Lake Nature Center is a 123-acre (50 ha) wildlife refuge and environmental education center in Denver, Colorado, located along Sand Creek on the eastern edge of the former Stapleton International Airport. Bluff Lake hosts nearly 40,000 visitors each year, with the majority coming from east Denver neighborhoods and part of school-based and public programs.

== Programs ==
Bluff Lake Nature Center offers science education programs in partnership with Denver Public Schools, Aurora Public Schools, and Adams County Public Schools. Summer week-long Junior Naturalist camps are held in June, July, and August.

Bluff Lake Nature Center is free and open to the public, serving a role as unplanned open space for children and families in the nearby neighborhoods.

== Habitat and wildlife ==
Bluff Lake Nature Center consists of a variety of native habitats including wetlands, short-grass prairie, a riparian zone and wetland woodland. Thanks to its 60 year history as an airport buffer, Bluff Lake has become an urban wildlife refuge for waterfowl, shorebirds, raptors, songbirds, deer, fox, beaver, reptiles, amphibians and other types of wildlife that visit or live at the site.
