= 38th & Blake station =

Commuter rail station in Denver, Colorado

38th•Blake
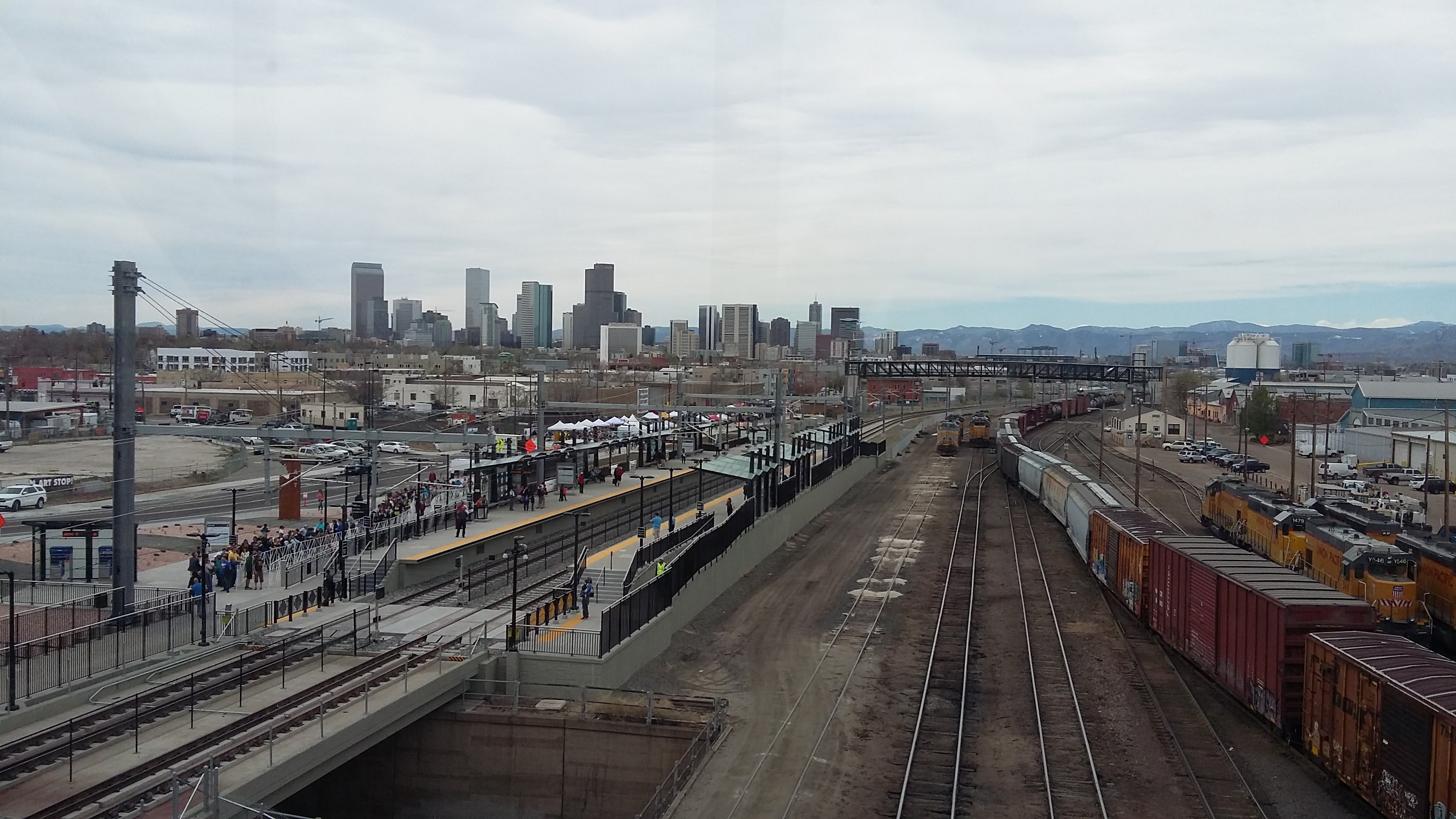
- 38th & Blake station platforms and the Denver skyline as seen from the station's pedestrian bridge

General information
- Location: 3737 Blake Street; Denver, Colorado
- Coordinates: 39°46′14.5″N 104°58′25.6″W
- Owner: Regional Transportation District
- Line: East Corridor
- Platforms: 2 side platforms
- Connections: RTD Bus: 7, 12, ART

Construction
- Structure type: At-grade
- Parking: 200 spaces
- Cycle facilities: 6 lockers, 10 racks
- Accessible: Yes

History
- Opened: April 22, 2016

Passengers
- 2025: 1,795 (average daily)
- Rank: 14 out of 75

Services
Preceding station	RTD	Following station
Union Station Terminus	A Line	40th & Colorado toward Denver Airport
Location

38th & Blake station (sometimes stylized as 38th•Blake) is a Regional Transportation District (RTD) commuter rail station on the A Line in the Five Points neighborhood of Denver, Colorado. The station is the first eastbound from Union Station in downtown Denver. It opened on April 22, 2016, along with the rest of the A Line.

== Station layout ==
2F
Pedestrian bridge
1F

Platform Level

Wazee Street; parking
Union Pacific corridor
Side platform, doors will open on the right
Westbound
← toward Union Station (Terminus)
Eastbound
toward Denver Airport (40th & Colorado) →
Side platform, doors will open on the right
Blake Street; bus bays

38th & Blake station is located in Denver's Five Points neighborhood, near the River North Arts District (RiNo). It features a 200-space parking lot and a pedestrian bridge connects the station to its parking lot, as well as businesses and residences northwest of the station on Wazee Street.

FasTracks provisions the station as the northern terminus of the L Line, with two intermediate stops between 38th & Blake and the line's present terminus at 30th & Downing station. As of 2026, this extension is unfunded and there is no estimated completion date.

38th & Blake station is planned to be the centerpiece to a new, transit-oriented neighborhood that would replace existing industrial buildings with mixed-use buildings for residences, offices and retail. The station is within walking distance of the Mission Ballroom.

In 2023, Xcel Energy announced that it would relocate its Colorado headquarters to a new office building at 3500 Blake Street, two blocks southwest of the station. This move was completed in the summer of 2025.

== Public art ==
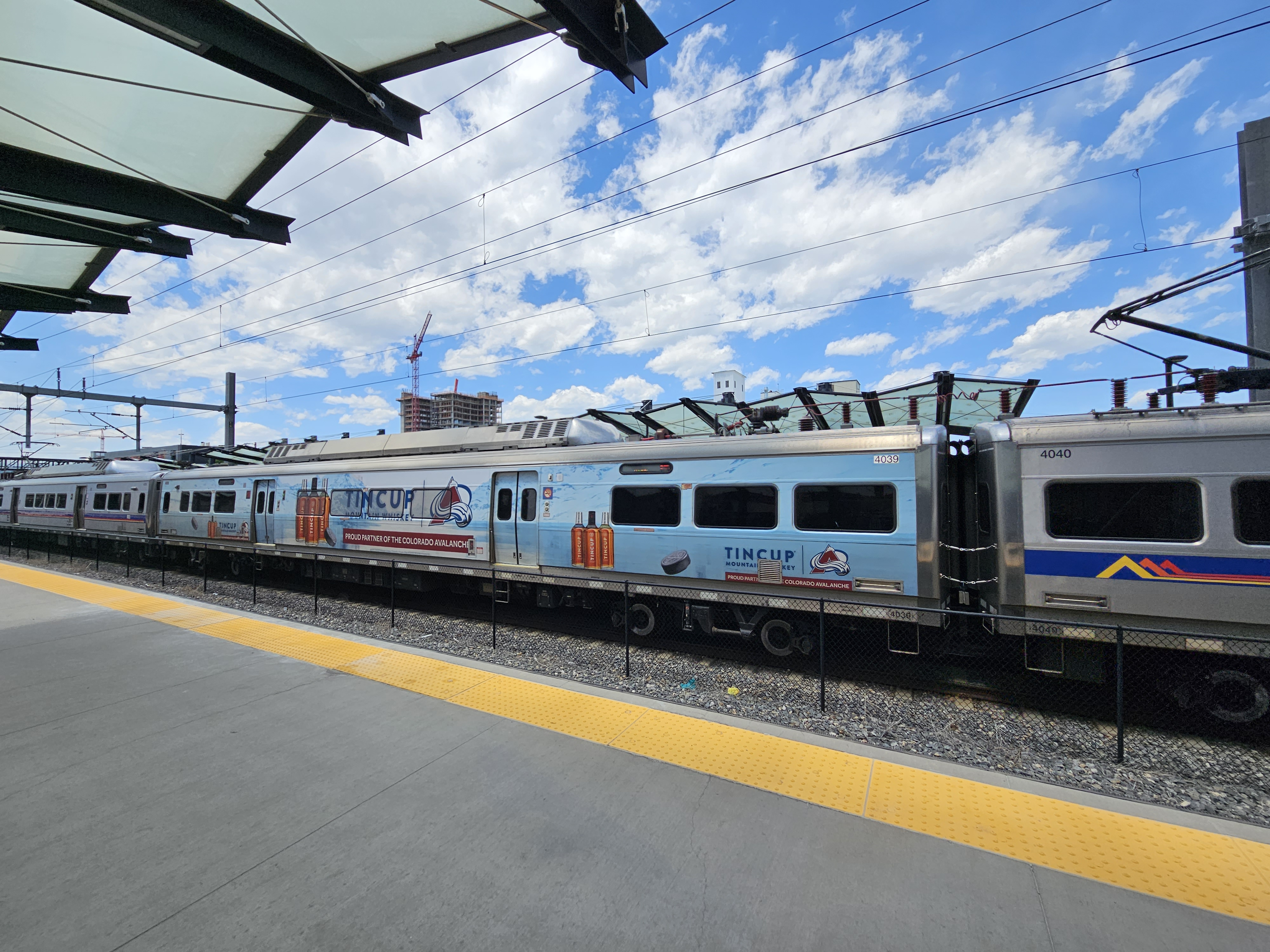
A Regional Transportation District commuter rail car advertising Tincup Whiskey and the Colorado Avalanche at the 38th & Blake Station.

38th & Blake station features an art piece titled Conflux/Redox by artist, architect, and printmaker Kelton Osborn. It was installed in 2016 on the sides of the station's pedestrian bridge's concrete support structure. Conlux/Redox is made of powder coated aluminum and steel in a design inspired by the heavy industry that once existed around the station and the future creative industry of RiNo.
