= American Candidate =

2004 reality television series

- Genre: Reality television
- Created by: R. J. Cutler
- Presented by: Montel Williams
- Country of origin: United States
- Original language: English
- No. of seasons: 1
- No. of episodes: 10

Production
- Executive producers: Jay Roach; Tom Lassally
- Running time: 2 hours

Original release
- Network: Showtime
- Release: August 1 – October 10, 2004

American Candidate is an American reality television series broadcast by Showtime. The series premiered on August 1, 2004, and concluded with its tenth episode on October 10, 2004. The series depicted a competition among twelve diverse contestants for a $200,000 reward. The contestants were required to travel across the United States in order to compete in a series of politically-themed challenges reminiscent of a political campaign. These challenges tested the candidates' presidential qualifications and qualities. Each week, a contestant was eliminated through means of audience participation and polling. Whichever contestant remained at the end of competition received the monetary reward in addition to a national platform. The series was hosted by American television presenter Montel Williams.

== Format ==
Paralleling the 2004 United States presidential election, the show featured contestants running as "candidates" in a mock campaign. Initially, the public could announce their "candidacy" on the show's website and garner support. Eventually, eleven contestants were chosen to appear on the show itself.

Each week, the contestants would compete in a politically themed challenge, coached by various political experts. The two contestants who fared the poorest each week would debate, and one would be eliminated (voted by the remaining contestants). For the final two episodes, the viewers voted, and eventually chose the final winner.

== Challenges ==
Throughout the series, the contestants traveled in a bus all over the United States, participating in various challenges, each modeled on real activities candidates for public office might expect to undergo:

- Week 1: Hometown support
- Week 2: Deliver a speech on the war on terror to residents of New Hampshire
- Week 3: Press conference on jobs and the economy in Allentown, Pennsylvania
- Week 4: Charlottesville, Virginia
- Week 5: Focus groups in New York City
- Week 6: Political ads in Washington D.C.
- Week 7: Philadelphia
- Week 8-9: Los Angeles
- Week 10: Finale

== Contestants ==
In reverse elimination order:

1. Park Gillespie (Conservative Christian, winner)
2. Malia Lazu
3. Lisa Witter
4. Keith Boykin (gay rights activist)
5. Bruce Friedrich (animal rights activist)
6. Joyce Riley (Gulf War veterans spokesperson)
7. Richard Mack (gun store owner)
8. James M. Strock (Entrepreneur, Speaker, Former Public Official)
9. Robert W. Vanech (entrepreneur, venture capitalist)
10. Chrissy Gephardt (daughter of Dick Gephardt)
