= Balloon Man Running =

Sculpture in Denver, Colorado, U.S.

- Artist: Sean O'Meallie
- Dimensions: 3.7 m (12 ft)
- Location: Denver, Colorado, United States
- 39.770215°N 104.892552°W

Balloon Man Running is a 12-foot (3.7 m) tall sculpture by Sean O'Meallie, installed at Denver's Central Park station, in the U.S. state of Colorado. Installed in 2016, it was removed for maintenance in 2024, before returning some time before late March 2025.
