= Climate Counts =

Non-profit climate change campaign

- Formation: 2007
- Founder: Gary Hirshberg
- Type: Nonprofit organization
- Purpose: Corporate climate accountability; consumer climate advocacy
- Headquarters: United States
- Region served: Worldwide
- Methods: Corporate scorecards; public rankings; consumer campaigns; climate advocacy
- Key people: Gary Hirshberg

Climate Counts, spearheaded by Stonyfield Farm CEO Gary Hirshberg, is a non-profit campaign that scores companies annually on the basis of their voluntary action to reverse climate change. The Climate Counts Company Scorecard, launched in June 2007, helps people vote with their dollars by making climate-conscious purchasing and investing choices that put pressure on the world's most well-known companies to take the issue of climate change seriously. Climate Counts aims to mobilize everyday consumers—not just the traditional environmental community—as the most important activists in the fight against global warming.

Companies are given a 0 to 100 score based on whether they have measured their climate footprint, set goals and targets to reduce their impact on global warming (with ongoing progress toward those reductions to show for it), supported (or suggest intent to block) progressive climate legislation, and publicly disclosed their climate actions clearly and comprehensively. They outline their criteria for scoring in greater detail in the Climate Counts Scorecard.

Climate Counts publishes a downloadable pocket shopping guide based on company scores and ranks and in keeping with the organization's own efforts to reduce its impact, offers shoppers the option of having a paperless version sent to their cell phones.
