= James Strock =

American businessman (born 1956)

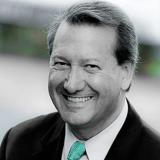
- Born: August 19, 1956 (age 70); Austin, Texas, U.S.
- Education: Isidore Newman School; Harvard College; Harvard Law School; New College, Oxford
- Political party: Independent (2009-present); Republican (before 2009)
- Website: servetolead.com

James Strock (born August 19, 1956) is an American writer, speaker, businessman, and former senior-level public official. Strock is the author of three books on leadership, and a fourth on political reform in the United States. Based in Rancho Santa Fe, California, he is a frequent speaker at conferences and corporate events across the U.S. and in other nations. Strock previously served as the founding Secretary of the California Environmental Protection Agency, and as Assistant Administrator for Enforcement (chief law enforcement officer) of the U.S. Environmental Protection Agency.

== Personal history ==
Born in Austin, Texas, Strock graduated from Isidore Newman School in New Orleans, Louisiana. He received a bachelor's degree from Harvard College (Phi Beta Kappa), where he was a student of Harvey Mansfield, and a juris doctor from Harvard Law School. While in law school he served as a teaching assistant to Professor Richard Neustadt of the Harvard Kennedy School. He subsequently attended New College, Oxford for a year, sponsored by the Ambassadorial Scholarships program of Rotary International, where he was a student of Anne Barton. He served to captain in the reserves, Judge Advocate General of the U.S. Army, 1989–96. He received the Ross Essay Prize of the American Bar Association in 1985 for a study of compensation of victims of environmental disasters.

== Career ==
Strock served as special consultant to the Office of Majority Leader, U.S. Senate (1982–83), and special assistant to U.S. EPA Administrator William Ruckelshaus (1983–85). From 1985 to 1986 he served as special counsel to the United States Senate Committee on Environment and Public Works, reporting primarily to Senator Alan K. Simpson. He practiced environmental and corporate law for Davis Graham & Stubbs in Denver, Colorado in 1986–88, where he worked with Gregory J. Hobbs, Jr. He served in the Reagan and George H. W. Bush administrations as general counsel of the United States Office of Personnel Management under Director Constance Horner (1988–89). He was appointed Assistant Administrator for Enforcement, U.S. Environmental Protection Agency by President George H.W. Bush, and unanimously confirmed by the U.S. Senate, in 1989. Reporting to Administrator William K. Reilly, he served until 1991.

In 1991 California Governor Pete Wilson appointed Strock to his cabinet as the founding Secretary for Environmental Protection. Strock served through May 1997. Among the honors accorded the agency was an Innovations in American Government Award selected by the Ford Foundation and the Harvard Kennedy School. In 1997–98 Strock served as an appointee of Governor Wilson to the California State Personnel Board.

During this time he served as a member of the Intergovernmental Policy Advisory Committee, Office of the U.S. Trade Representative.

Strock founded the Serve to Lead Group in 1997. The company provides services in leadership development, management and communications, as well as the environment-energy space, and conflict resolution. He speaks and writes frequently on topics in these areas.

Strock is an advisory board member and past trustee of the Theodore Roosevelt Association, a member of the Council on Foreign Relations, and the Authors Guild. He serves on the advisory council of the non-partisan reform group, Represent.US. He was an independent member of the board of CVR Energy from 2012 to 2024, and past member of the board of the Environmental Law Institute.

In 2010–12 Strock served as co-chair of the Arizona Governor's Solar Energy Task Force.

A longtime advocate of national service, Strock is a former member of the board of Youth Service America. In 1989 he proposed linking citizenship obligations and opportunities through a national program of "Citizen Service".

Strock appeared in the Showtime television series American Candidate. He has appeared on Fox, CNN, C-SPAN, and other networks, and has written for or been quoted in many newspapers, including the Los Angeles Times, New York Times, USA Today, and San Jose Mercury News.

He served on the Founders Council of Unity 08, a technology-based, non-partisan reform initiative established to provide an alternative to the traditional party presidential candidates in the 2008 election. Formerly a member of the Republican Party, Strock is a registered Independent, committed to political reform.

In 2014 Strock was the keynote speaker at the annual Reagan Dinner, celebrating the birthday of the former president, hosted by the Ronald W. Reagan Society at Eureka College.

== Books ==
Serve to Lead 2.0: 21st Century Leadership Manual, ISBN 978-1978489554.

Disrupt Politics: Reset Washington, ISBN 978-0984077472. Winner, Current Events/Social Change Category, Next Generation Indie Book Awards.

Serve to Lead: Your Transformational 21st Century Leadership System, ISBN 978-0-9840774-2-7. Winner, Business Category, and Third-Place Non-Fiction Grand Prize, Next Generation Indie Book Awards.

Reagan on Leadership: Executive Lessons from the Great Communicator, Reagan Centennial Edition, foreword by Tom Peters, ISBN 978-0-9840774-3-4.

Theodore Roosevelt on Leadership: Executive Lessons from the Bully Pulpit, ISBN 0-7615-1539-9.
