= George D. Begole =

American politician (1877–1956)

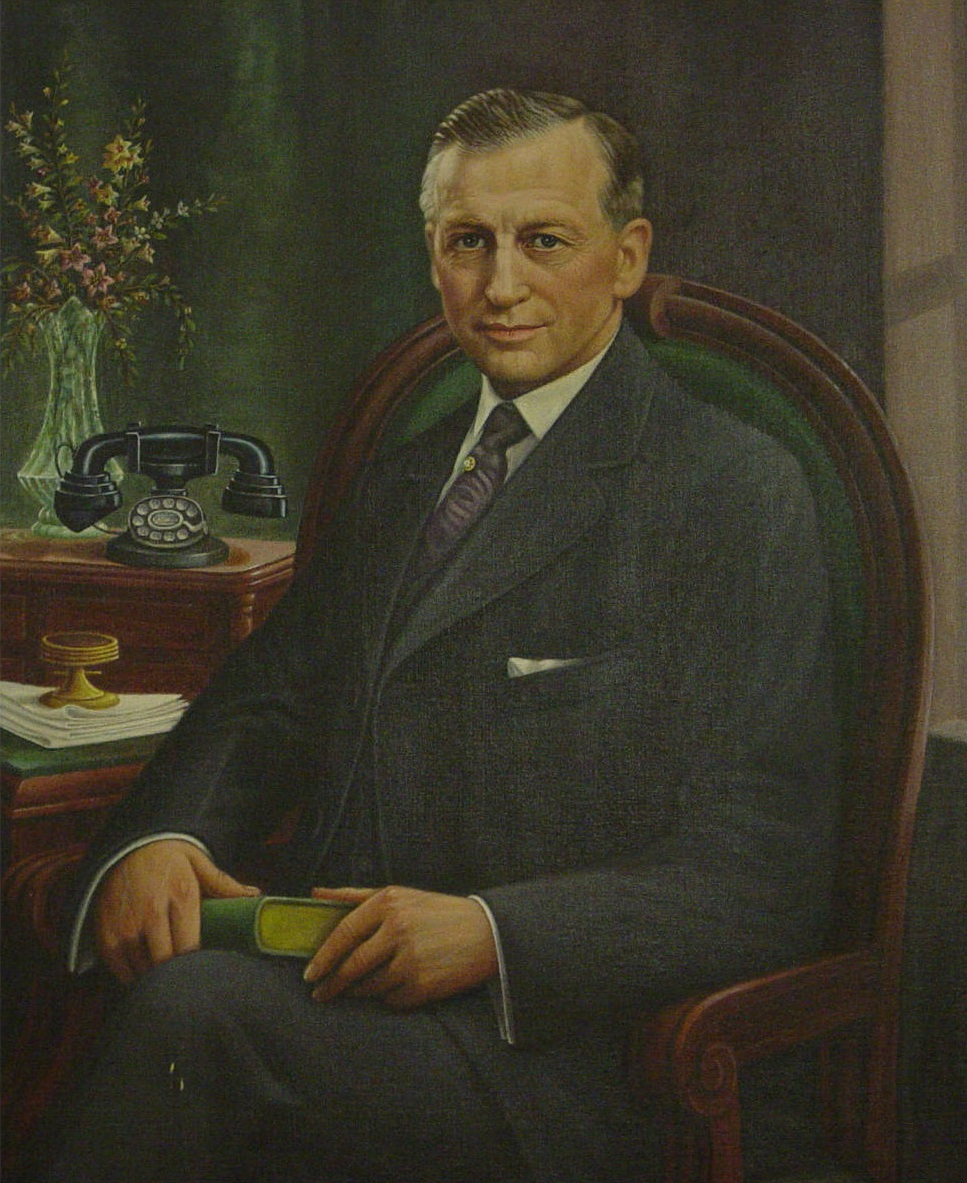
- Begole, circa 1932

34th Mayor of Denver
- In office 1931–1935
- Preceded by: Benjamin F. Stapleton
- Succeeded by: Benjamin F. Stapleton

Personal details
- Born: George Davis Begole; May 28, 1877; Kirksville, Missouri, U.S.
- Died: December 22, 1956 (aged 79); Denver, Colorado, U.S.
- Political party: Republican

George Davis Begole (May 28, 1877 – December 22, 1956) was an American politician who served as the mayor of Denver, Colorado from 1931 to 1935.
