= Robert Alan Goldberg =

American historian (born 1949)

Robert Alan Goldberg (born August 16, 1949) is an American historian. He teaches at the University of Utah and has written several books as well as articles and papers. He has written about social movements, conspiracies, Barry Goldwater, and Jewish farmers in Clarion, Utah and the American West.

Goldberg was born in New York City on August 16, 1949. He studied history at Arizona State University, and completed a doctorate in history at the University of Wisconsin–Madison. He began teaching in 1977 as an assistant history professor at the University of Texas at San Antonio. The University of Utah, where he has taught since 1980, has a collection of his papers.

In 2019, he sought the removal of a swastika from a gravemarker in Utah of a German POW.

Elliott West described his book on the rise and fall of the Ku Klux Klan in Colorado as sophisticated and well written, noting it uses case studies to cover the subject. Publishers Weekly described his book on Barry Goldwater as well balanced and solid. A review in the Great Plains Quarterly describes his book on the Colorado Klan as an interesting profile with fascinating detail.

== Bibliography ==
- Enemies Within: The Culture of Conspiracy in Modern America, Yale University Press (2001)
- American views : documents in American history (1998)
- Barry Goldwater, Yale University Press (1995)
- Grassroots Resistance: Social Movements in Twentieth Century America (1991)
- Back to the Soil: The Jewish Farmers of Clarion, Utah, and Their World (1986)
- Shooting in the dark : recovering the Jewish farmers of an American Zion (1983)
- Hooded Empire: The Ku Klux Klan in Colorado (1977)
