= Stapleton International Airport =

Former airport of Denver, Colorado, United States (1929–1995)

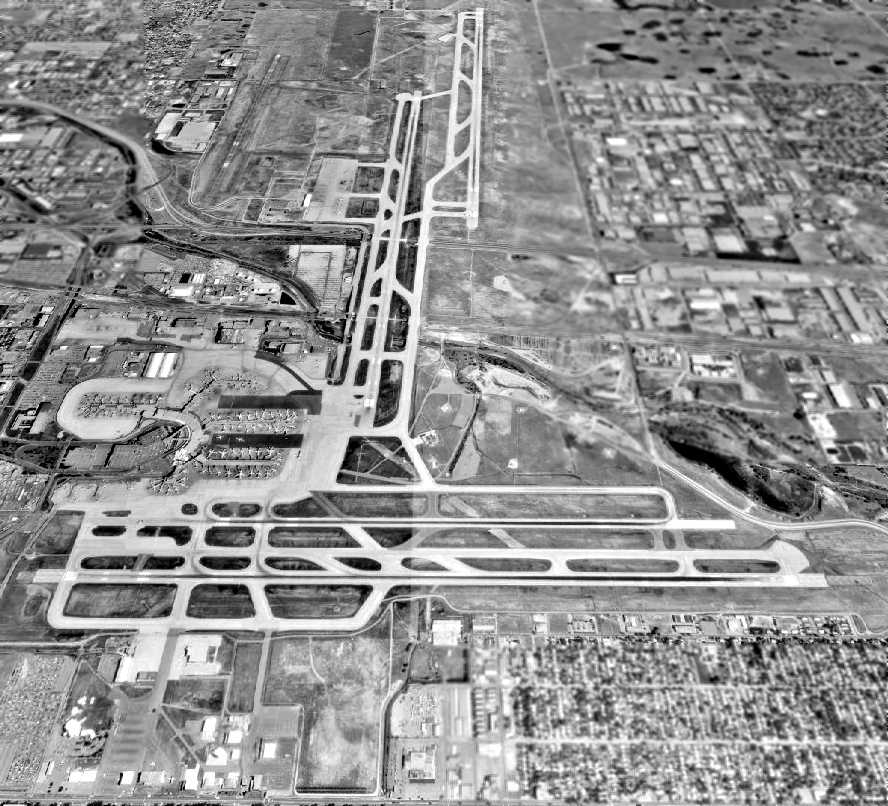
- Stapleton International Airport looking north, shortly before its closure
- IATA: ~~DEN~~; ICAO: ~~KDEN~~; FAA LID: ~~DEN~~

Summary
- Airport type: Defunct
- Owner/Operator: City of Denver
- Serves: Denver metropolitan area
- Location: Central Park, Colorado, U.S.
- Opened: October 17, 1929
- Closed: February 27, 1995
- Hub for: Braniff International Airways; Continental Airlines (1972–1995); Frontier Airlines I; Frontier Airlines II; Hughes Airwest; People Express Airlines; Trans World Airlines; United Airlines; Western Airlines
- Elevation AMSL: 5,333 ft (1,625 m)
- Coordinates: 39.761°N 104.892°W

Map
- Location within the United States Location within Colorado

Runways
Direction	Length		Surface
Direction	m	ft	Surface
17R/35L	3,505	11,500	Concrete
17L/35R	3,658	12,000	Concrete
8L/26R	2,621	8,599	Concrete
8R/26L	3,049	10,004	Concrete
7/25	1,485	4,871	Concrete
18/36	2,362	7,750	Asphalt

Stapleton International Airport (IATA: ~~DEN~~, ICAO: ~~KDEN~~, FAA LID: ~~DEN~~) was a major airport in the western United States, and the primary airport of Denver, Colorado. It opened on October 17, 1929, and was replaced by Denver International Airport in February 1995.

It was a hub for Continental Airlines, the original Frontier Airlines, People Express, United Airlines, and Western Airlines. Other airlines with smaller operations at Stapleton included Aspen Airways, today's Frontier Airlines, and Rocky Mountain Airways, all three being based in Denver at the time.

After its demolition, Stapleton International's footprint was redeveloped as a commercial and residential neighborhood called Stapleton, which was renamed Central Park in 2020 to distance itself from Benjamin F. Stapleton, a former member of the Ku Klux Klan.

The Stapleton International Airport codes were transferred to Denver International, which continues to use them today.

== History ==
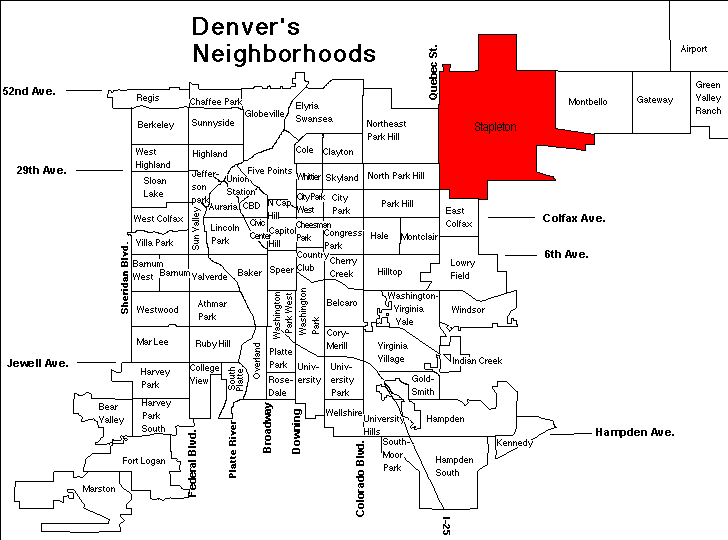
The location of Stapleton Airport on a map of Denver neighborhoods

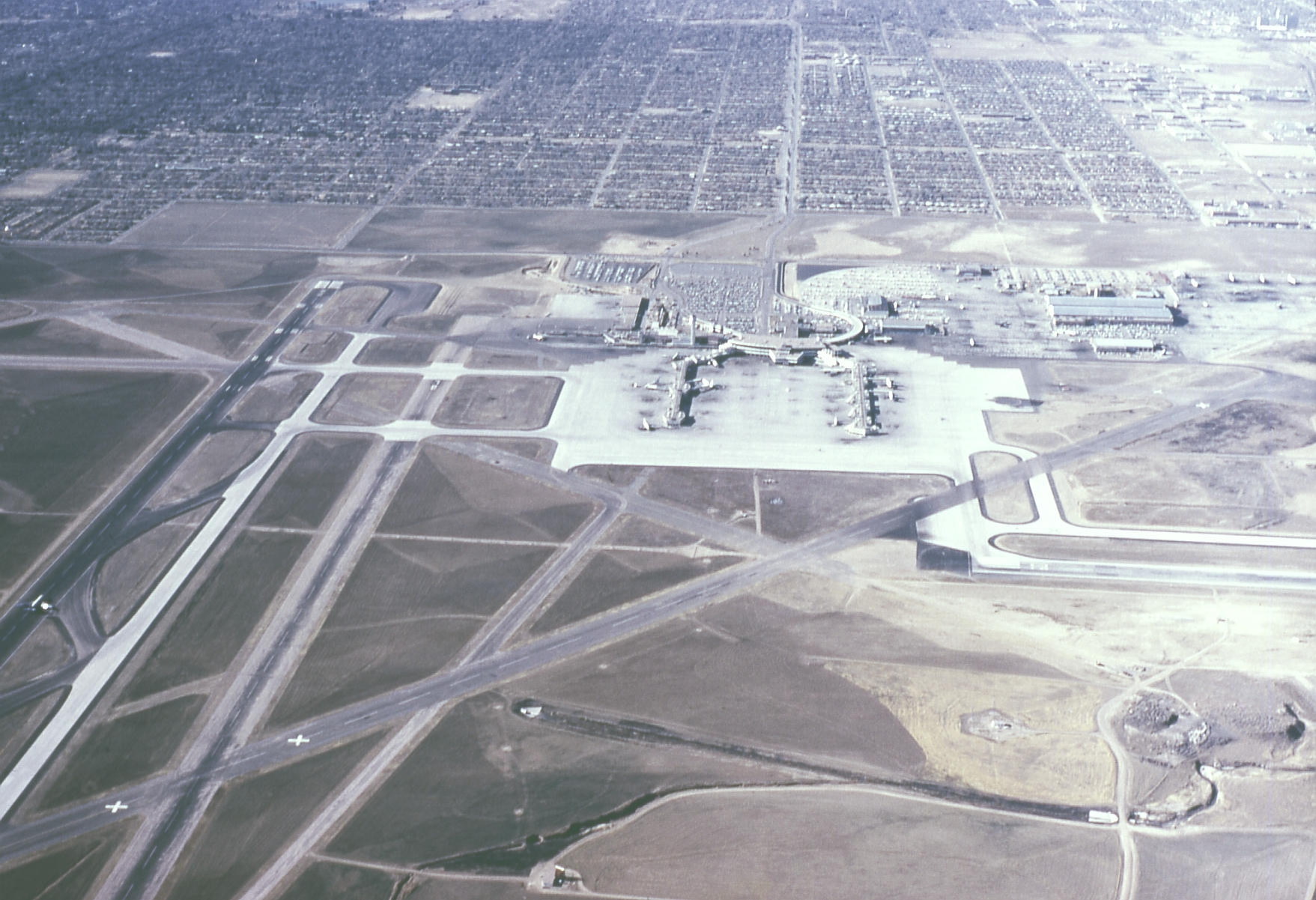
Looking west, January 1966. Only concourses A, B, and C existed then. A United Airlines Pilot Training Center was later built on the vacant land between the airport's west boundary and the housing tracts.

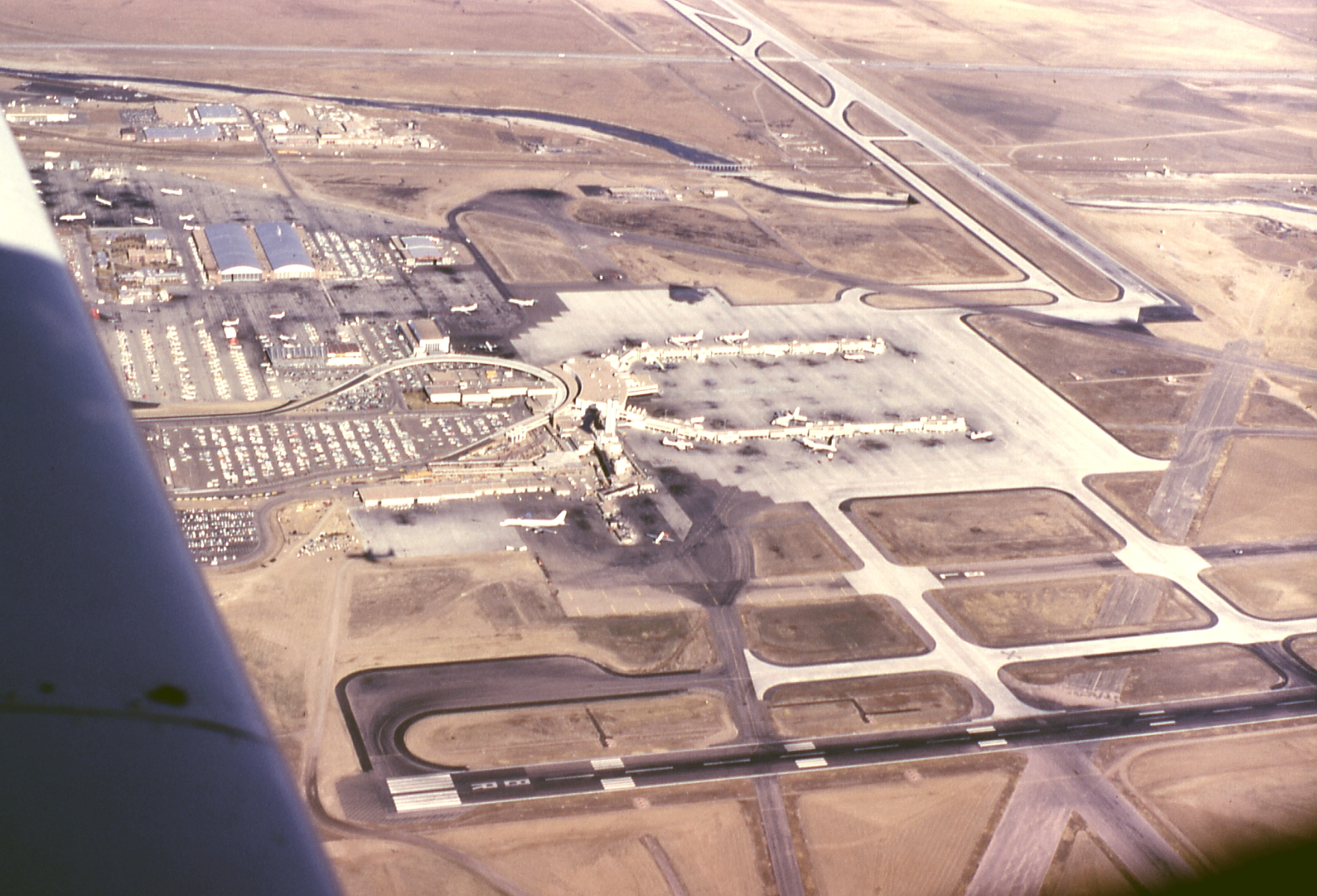
Looking north, January 1966. Runway 35 became 35L, after 35R was built. The old United Airlines pilot training center buildings, on the airport proper, were still in operation. A UAL DC-8 pilot training flight has just made a missed approach, complete with its shadow.

=== Prewar and wartime years (1929–1945) ===
Stapleton opened in 1929 as Denver Municipal Airport on October 17. The development of the airport was spearheaded by Denver mayor Benjamin F. Stapleton and Improvements and Parks Department manager Charles Vail. Prior to the new airport's opening, Denver had been served by a number of smaller facilities, including an airstrip along Smith Road in Aurora (first used in 1911), an airfield at 26th Avenue and Oneida Street, Lowry Field near 38th Avenue and Dahlia Street, and Denver Union Airport at 46th Avenue east of Colorado Boulevard.

In the late 1930s the facilities consisted of two hangars and a small administration building mainly used for air mail processing. United Airlines and Continental Airlines began service in 1937. The March 1939 Official Aviation Guide (OAG) shows nine weekday departures: seven United and two Continental.

Continental moved its headquarters from El Paso, Texas, to Denver in October 1937, as airline president Robert F. Six believed that the airline should have its headquarters in a large city with a potential base of customers. Continental moved its headquarters to Los Angeles in July 1963.

The airfield was renamed Stapleton Airfield on 25 August 1944, in honor of Mayor Stapleton, who had served from 1923 to 1931 and from 1935 until 1947.

=== Postwar years (1945–1978) ===
Stapleton's modern horseshoe-shaped terminal design was announced in 1946, and was shelved in 1947 by incoming mayor James Newton. The original administration building was extended with new wings in the early 1950s, and replaced entirely in 1954.

DC-4 nonstop flights to Chicago, San Francisco and Los Angeles began in 1946; DC-6 nonstops to Washington, DC, began in 1951 and to New York in 1952. Denver then had five airlines: United flew across the country, Continental flew south and east, Braniff flew to Texas, Frontier flew to smaller cities north and south from Denver, and Western connected Denver to Minneapolis and to Edmonton in Canada. TWA and Central arrived in 1956.

The April 1957 OAG shows 38 daily United departures, 12 for Continental, 7 Braniff, 7 Frontier, 7 Western, 5 TWA and 1 Central. The jet age arrived in May 1959 when Continental began operating Boeing 707s to Stapleton, initially under weight restrictions due to Stapleton's runway weight capacity. (Scheduled 707s started in August 1959.)

Runway 17/35 and a new terminal building opened in 1964; runway 17L opened sometime between 1975 and 1980. Stapleton adopted the "International" name in 1964, but its first nonstop international flight came in 1968, when Western began flights to Calgary. The Boeing 747 was introduced to Stapleton on Continental's Los Angeles route in 1970.

In the early 1970s Frontier was in Concourse A, United occupied most of Concourse B, and Western and Continental occupied most of Concourse C. United and TWA served both coasts nonstop, while Continental and Western nonstop flights only extended to the western half of the country. Concourse D was built in 1972.

=== Post-deregulation (1978–1985) ===
After deregulation, Denver's four major airlines developed hubs at Stapleton. United occupied Concourse B, Continental and Western occupied Concourse C and Frontier occupied Concourse D. Western flew nonstop between Denver and London in 1981 and 1982, but then shifted resources to Salt Lake City and Los Angeles. Denver had ceased to be a Western hub by the time Delta acquired that airline in 1987. In 1983 Arrow Air introduced transatlantic services to London and Manchester, and Condor flew a weekly charter to Frankfurt, Germany. Southwest Airlines and People Express tried low-cost service to Denver in the mid-1980s, but Southwest withdrew and People Express was acquired by Continental.

In September 1982 the first revenue flight of the Boeing 767 arrived at Stapleton, a United flight from O'Hare International Airport in Chicago.

During the energy boom of the early 1980s, several skyscrapers were built in downtown Denver, including Republic Plaza (Denver's tallest at 714 feet). Due to Stapleton's location 3 miles (4.8 km) east of downtown, the Federal Aviation Administration imposed a building height restriction of 700–715 feet (depending on the building's position). This allowed an unimpeded glide slope for runways (8L/26R) and (8R/26L). The height restriction was lifted in 1995, well after the city's skyscrapers had been erected.

=== Decommissioning (1985–1995) ===
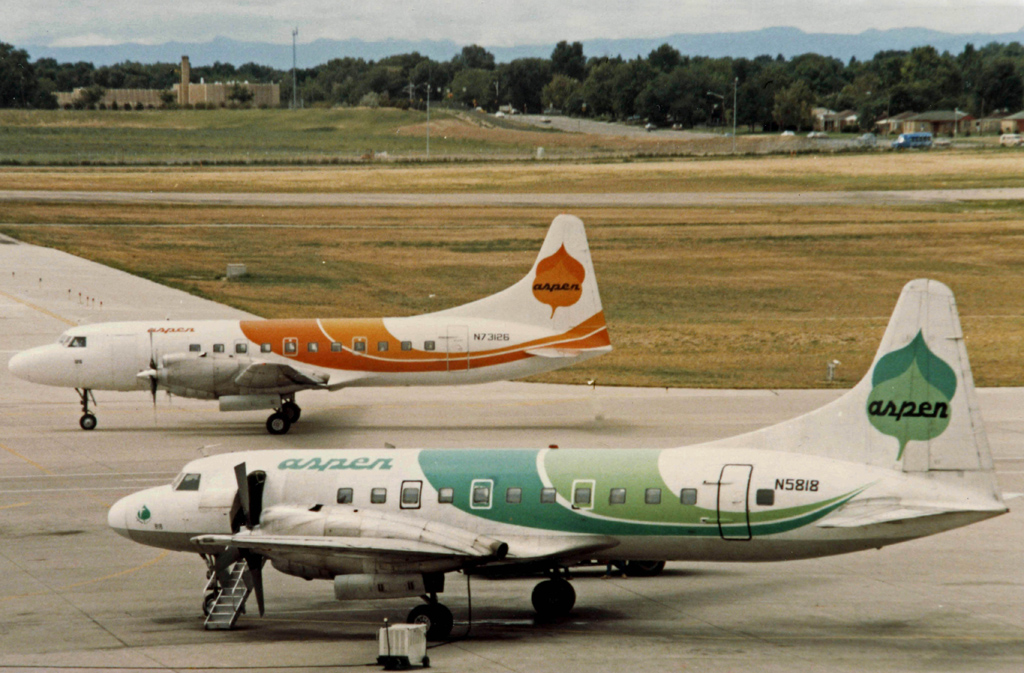
Two Convair 580s of the Denver-based Aspen Airways at Stapleton in 1986

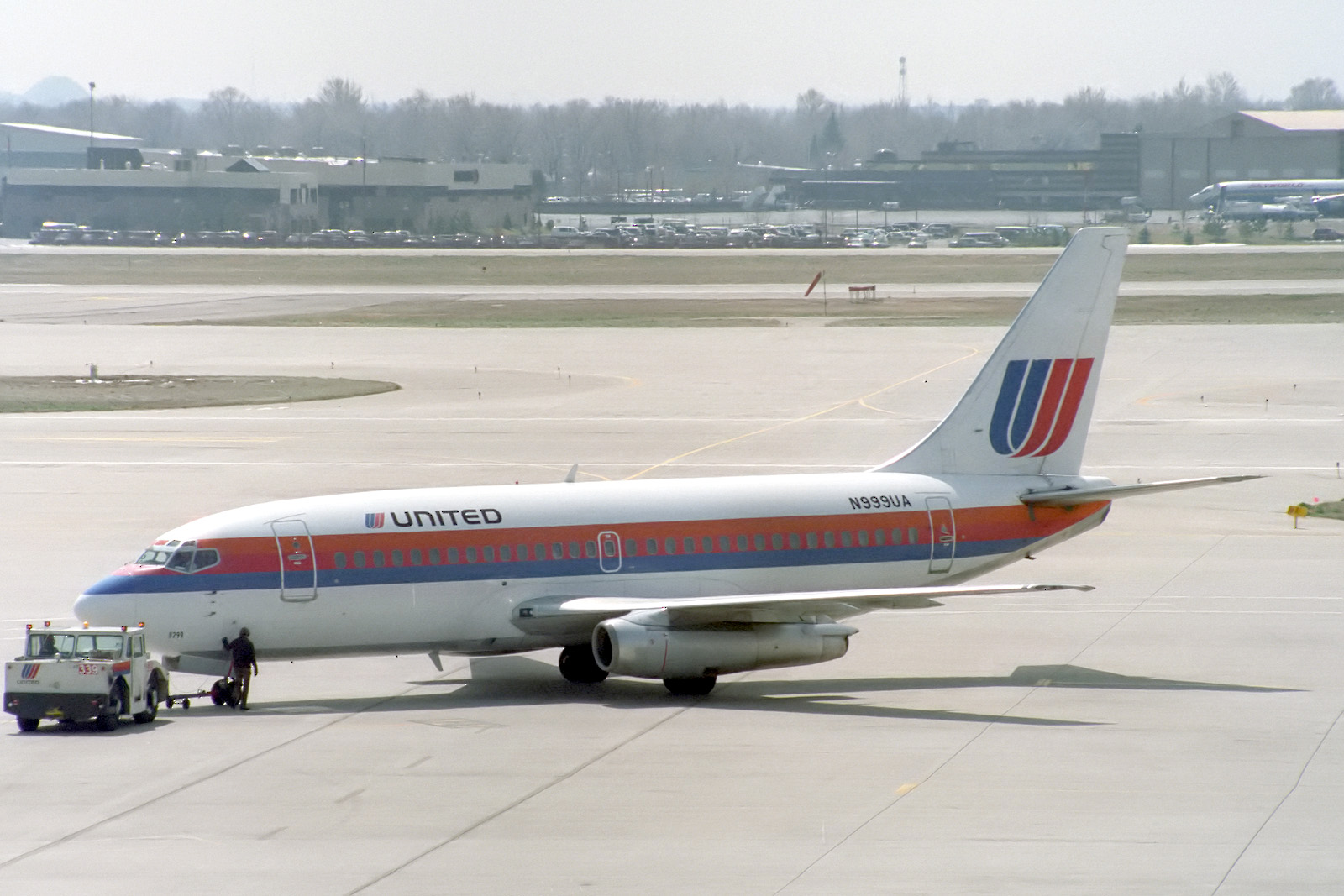
A United Airlines Boeing 737-200 at Stapleton in April 1989. This aircraft would later crash as United Airlines Flight 585 in 1991.

By the 1980s, plans were under way to replace Stapleton, which had a number of problems, including:

- inadequate lateral separation between runways, leading to long waits during instrument-flight operations
- little or no room for other airlines that wanted to use Stapleton for new destinations (one such example was Southwest Airlines, now a large carrier at Denver International Airport)
- a lawsuit over aircraft noise, brought by residents of the nearby Park Hill community
- legal threats by Adams County, to block a runway extension into Rocky Mountain Arsenal lands

The Colorado General Assembly brokered a deal in 1985 to annex a plot of land in Adams County into the city of Denver, and use that land to build a new airport. Adams County voters approved the plan in 1988, and Denver voters approved the plan in a 1989 referendum.

To combat congestion, runway 18/36 was added in the 1980s and the terminal was again expanded with the $250-million (or $58-million according to the New York Times), 24-gate Concourse E opening in 1988, despite Denver's replacement airport already being under construction. By the early 1990s, Concourses A and B were exclusively used by United and United Express; Continental used most of Concourses C and D, and most other airlines moved to Concourse E. In the early 1990s, several charter services to the United Kingdom were introduced, and Martinair inaugurated services to Amsterdam until Stapleton's closure. Continental closed its Stapleton pilot and flight attendant bases in October 1994, reducing operations and making United the airport's largest carrier. On the other hand, despite leaving Stapleton in the 1980s due to congestion, the new Denver International Airport would eventually become Southwest's largest base.

On February 27, 1995, Delta Flight 569 from Dallas Fort Worth International Airport was the last revenue flight to land at Stapleton, scheduled for 7:59 pm. Later that evening, air traffic controller George Hosford cleared the last revenue flight—Continental Flight 34, a McDonnell Douglas DC-10 bound for London's Gatwick Airport scheduled to depart at 8:30 pm but delayed—to take off from Stapleton at 9:27 pm. The aircraft was piloted by Captain Gary "Gomo" Greer, First Officer Scott Nutter and Second Officer Bob Horn. After Flight 34 cleared the runway at 9:39 pm, the airport was shut down, marking the end of 65 years of service. A convoy of ground service equipment and other vehicles (rental cars, baggage carts, fuel trucks, etc.) traveled to the new Denver International Airport (DEN), which opened at 12:01 am on February 28.

=== Post-closure redevelopment ===
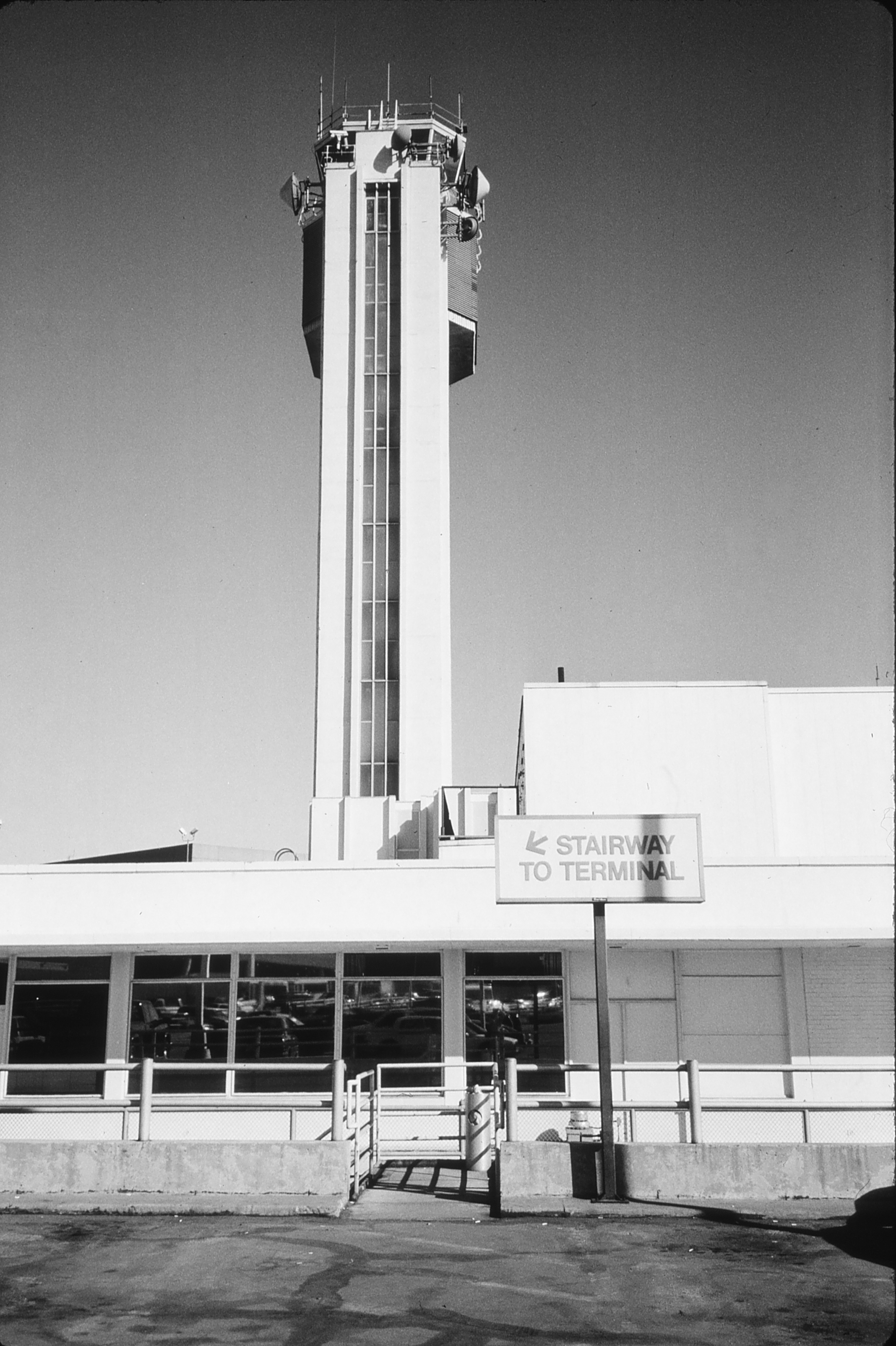
Control tower at Stapleton photographed from top level of close-in parking structure, 1995

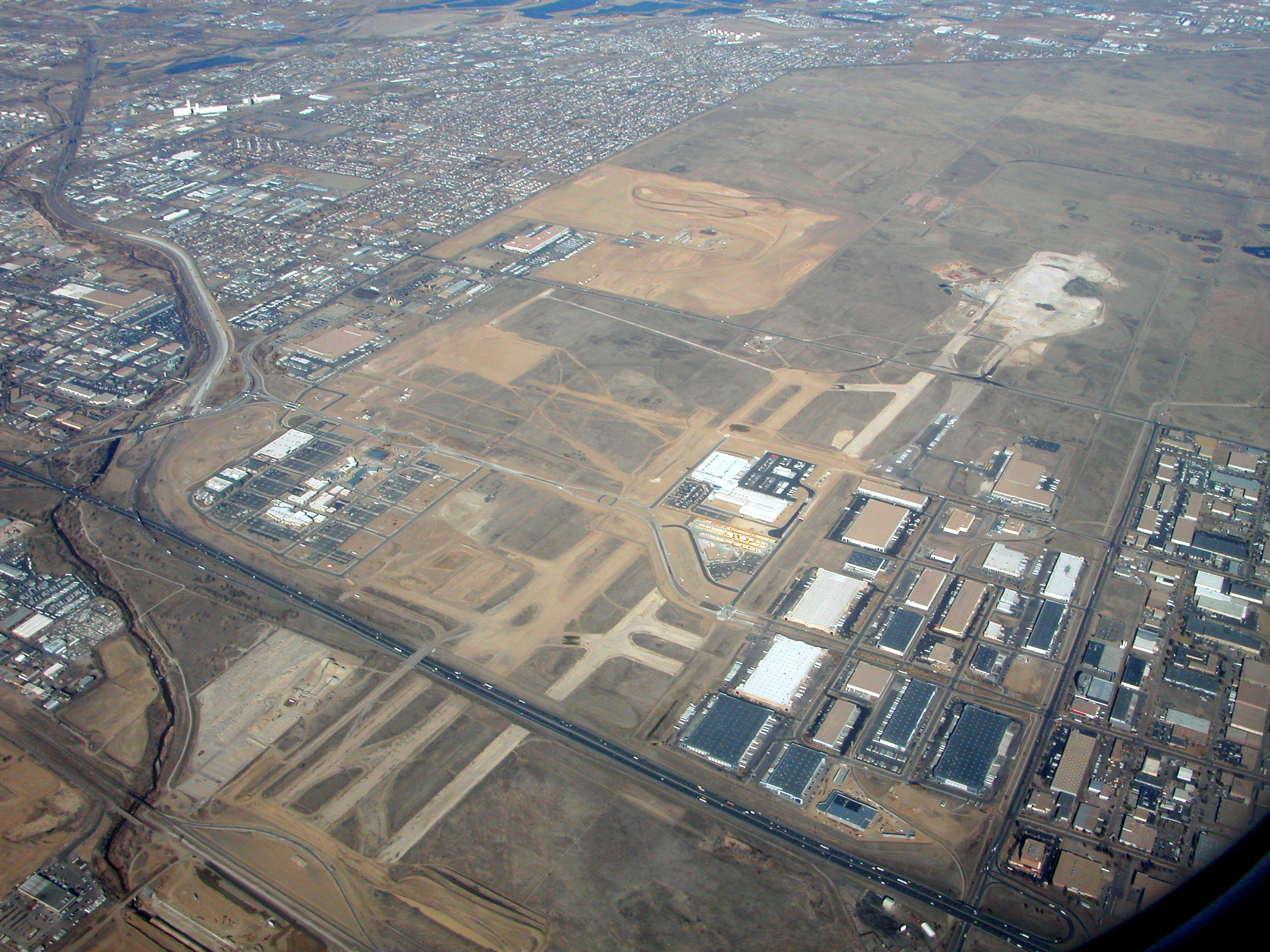
Former Stapleton International Airport (February 6, 2006)

When it closed in 1995, Stapleton had six runways (two sets of three parallel runways) and five terminal concourses. The runways at Stapleton were then marked with large yellow "X"s, which indicated it was no longer legal or safe for aircraft to land there. The IATA and ICAO airport codes of DEN and KDEN were transferred to the new DIA, to coincide with the same changes in airline and ATC computers, to ensure that flights to Denver would land at the new DIA. The main reason the decision was made to close the airport was because the runways were too close together. This would mean air traffic controllers would have to stagger airplane movements. Also, most of the runways were too short, considering the fact that the airport was at 5,333 ft above sea level. Denver International Airport runways are all at or over 12,000 feet (3,700 m) in length (runway 16R/34L is 16,000 feet (4,900 m)).

While Denver International was being built, planners began to consider how the Stapleton site would be redeveloped. A private group of Denver civic leaders, the Stapleton Development Foundation, convened in 1990 and produced a master plan for the site in 1995, emphasizing a pedestrian-oriented design rather than the automobile-oriented designs found in many other planned developments.

Denver sought tenants for Stapleton's terminal and concourses, but these buildings proved ill-suited for alternative uses. A July 1997 hailstorm punched several thousand holes in the roofs of the old terminal and concourses, causing water damage, which compelled the city to tear them down. The airport's 12-story control tower was retained and served for a time as part of the new Punch Bowl Social, a restaurant and social gathering spot. The office building attached to the tower housed the kitchens and social areas; the tower is closed to public access but is available for private tours.

Punch Bowl Social closed in 2020 due to the COVID-19 pandemic, but the tower was reopened by FlyteCo, a local brewery, in 2022.

Most of Stapleton's airport infrastructure has been removed, except for the control tower and some hangars, used by Denver Police Academy and by Arise Church Denver among others. The final parking structure was torn down to make room for the "Central Park West" section of the housing development in May 2011. While not part of the former airport, United—Stapleton's former largest carrier and current largest airline at Denver International—does operate a training center in the former Stapleton grounds.

A small section of the former runway 17L/35R remains, and is being used by a business for outdoor parking/storage.

== Facilities ==
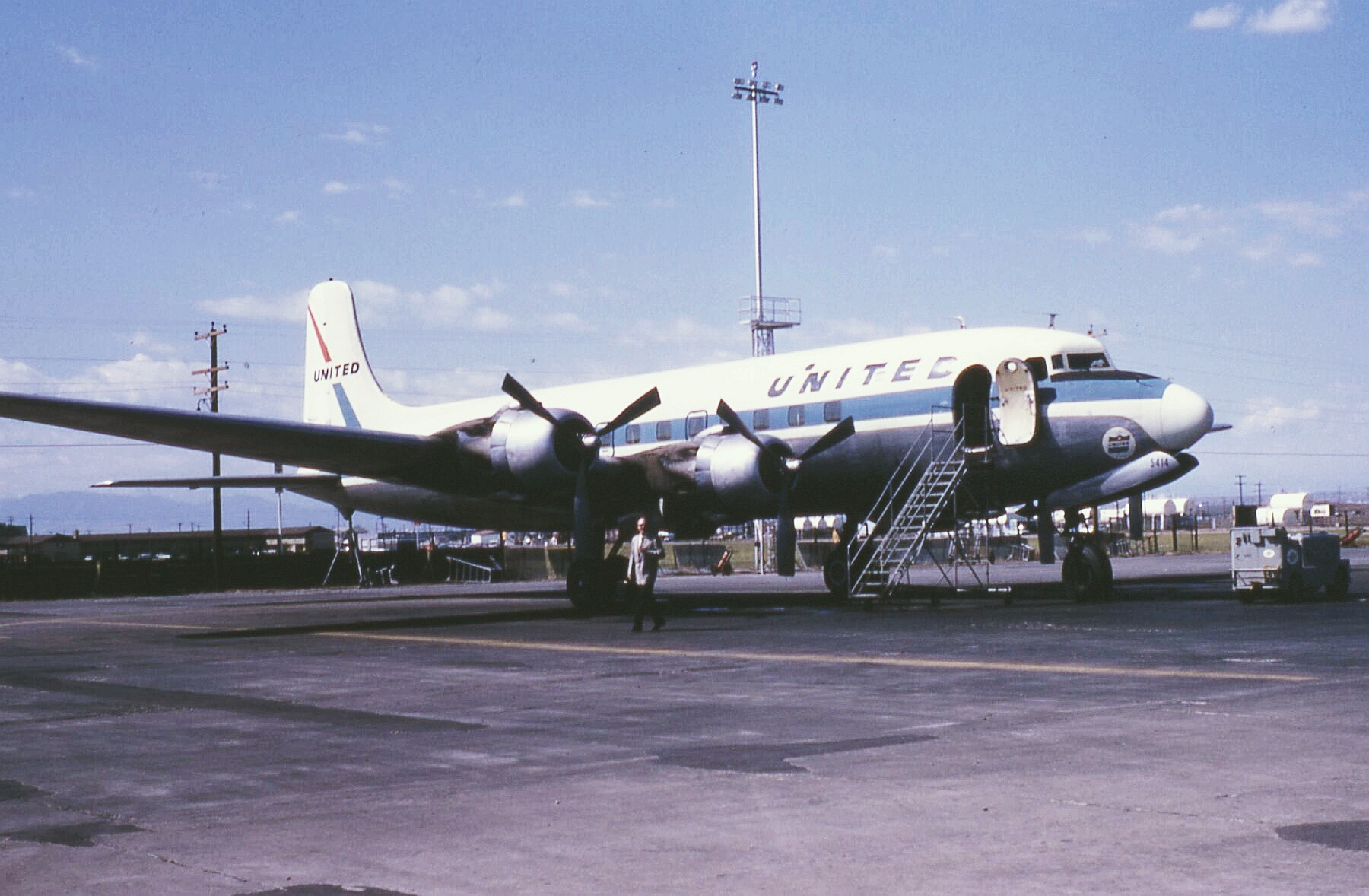
UAL Douglas DC-6 N37514 on the northwest maintenance ramp of Stapleton, September 1966

At the time of its decommissioning, the airport covered 4,700 acres (7.3 sq mi; 19.0 km^{2}) and had six runways:

- 17R/35L (11,500 ft), concrete. This runway and its taxiway bridged over highway I-70.
- 17L/35R (12,000 ft), concrete. This runway was on the opposite side of I-70 from the terminal, so accessing it required traveling across a taxiway bridge over I-70.
- 8L/26R (8,599 ft), concrete
- 8R/26L (10,004 ft), concrete
- 7/25 (4,871 ft), concrete
- 18/36 (7,750 ft), asphalt

The terminal had five concourses:

- Concourse A – Commuter flights, Mesa Air Group, United Airlines
- Concourse B – United Airlines
- Concourse C – Continental Airlines, Mexicana, Martinair, Condor
- Concourse D – Continental Express, Delta Air Lines, MarkAir, Pan Am, Trans World Airlines, Frontier Airlines,
- Concourse E – America West Airlines, American Airlines, Northwest Airlines, Sun Country, USAir, Midwest Express

== Accidents and incidents ==
Several major incidents occurred at Stapleton:

- On November 1, 1955, United Air Lines Flight 629 was blown up over Longmont shortly after takeoff from Stapleton while en route to Portland. Jack Gilbert Graham planted a bomb on the plane to kill his mother. He purchased travel insurance before the flight took off.
- On July 11, 1961, United Airlines Flight 859, a DC-8-12 (tail number N8040U), veered off the runway on landing. Asymmetric reverse thrust on engines 1 and 2 (left wing) resulted in a loss of directional control, causing the aircraft to collide with construction equipment; the driver of one vehicle died. In the ensuing fire, 17 of the DC-8's 122 occupants died.
- On December 21, 1967, Frontier Airlines Flight 2610, a Douglas C-47 converted to carry cargo, crashed after takeoff due to the failure of the crew to perform a pre-takeoff control check resulting in takeoff with the elevators immobilized by a control batten. Both occupants died.
- On August 7, 1975, Continental Airlines Flight 426, a Boeing 727 bound for Wichita, Kansas, crashed after encountering windshear on takeoff on runway 35L after climbing to 100 feet (30 m). Nobody died in the accident.
- On November 16, 1976, a Texas International DC-9-10 stalled after takeoff at Stapleton and crashed. There were 14 injuries among the 81 passengers and 5 crewmembers.

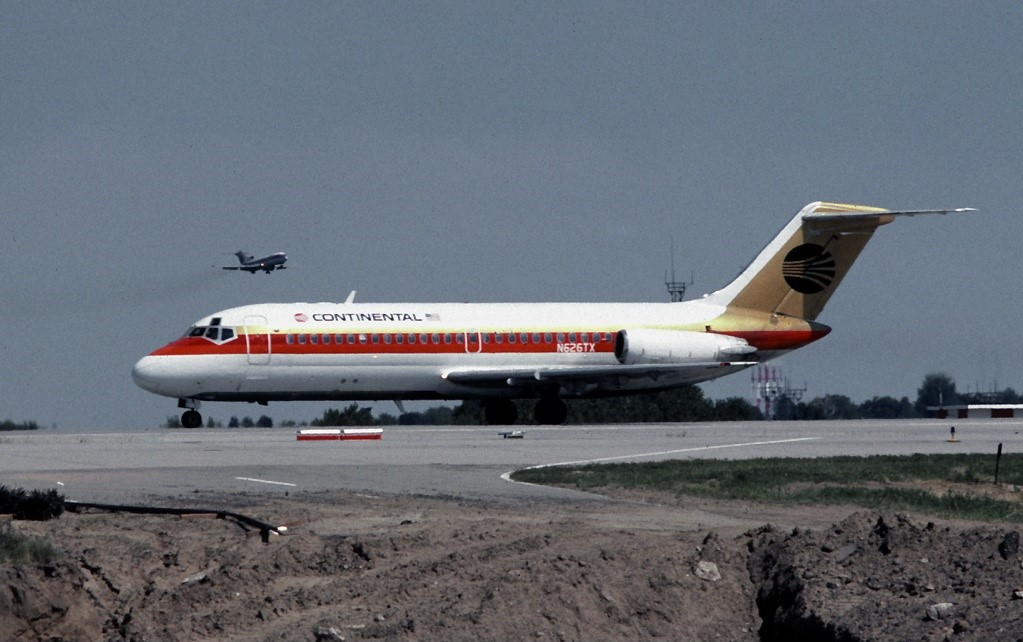
The aircraft involved as Flight 1713 at Stapleton in 1985

- On November 15, 1987, Continental Airlines Flight 1713, a DC-9-14 bound for Boise, Idaho, crashed on takeoff at Stapleton during a snowstorm. The probable cause of the crash was loss of control due to ice and snow adhering to the aircraft. The aircraft had been deiced, but spent longer than normal on the ground in moderate snowfall before takeoff due to confusion about its location. This accident led to significant changes in aircraft deicing fluids and flight crew procedures for checking for ice contamination prior to takeoff. Twenty-eight of the plane's 82 occupants died.
- On September 17, 1988, Continental Express Flight 2063, a Beechcraft 1900, made an intentional belly landing after diverting from North Platte Regional Airport when hydraulic issues arose and forced the aircraft to return to Stapleton. A Stapleton spokesman said, "It was a perfect landing, the propellers stopped turning when the aircraft was about four feet above the runway". There were no injuries and the aircraft was operational again within a week. The landing gear failed due to a manufacturing flaw.
